= Politics of Niger =

Politics of Niger takes place in a framework of a semi-presidential representative democratic republic, whereby the President of Niger is head of state and the Prime Minister of Niger head of government, and of a multi-party system. Executive power is exercised by the government. Legislative power is vested in both the government and the National Assembly.

In practice, politics in Niger is unstable. Since independence, Niger has had a long history of dictatorships, coups, and rebellions. The first transfer of power between democratically chosen presidents took place in the 2020–21 elections. However, a coup overthrew the civilian government in 2023.

== Political parties and elections ==
=== Fifth Republic ===
==== Continuity ====
Since the creation of the Fifth Republic in 1999, the political rivalries and parties of the Third Republic have maintained their central role in national politics. There continue to be three large parties, and several smaller ones, with no single party gaining a majority in the National Assembly of Niger. In the Third Republic a coalition of the CDS and PNDS was formed with many small parties, in part to keep the former military party of the MNSD out of power. This coalition collapsed in recriminations in 1995, leading to a PNDS and MNSD government facing a CDS President. The bad blood and gridlock resulting was one reasons for General Maïnassara's 1996 Nigerien coup d'etat.

The same three men who dominated the parties in the Third Republic returned in 1999: Mamadou Tanja for the MNSD-Nassara, Mahamadou Issoufou of the PNDS, and Mahamane Ousmane of CDS-Rahama.

==== 1999 elections ====
Following another coup in April 1999, in which Maïnassara was killed, the MNSD-Nassara's Tandja won the October 1999 presidential election.

In the October 1999 National Assembly Election, the MNSD won 38 of the 83 seats, forming a government under Hama Amadou with the support of CDS-Rahama's 17 seats. The PNDS led the opposition with 16 seats, but the continued antagonism between Mahamadou Issoufou and Mahamane Ousmane meant that no other coalition was available. ANDP-Zaman Lahiya, a former split for the MNSD held only four seats. In 2002, this coalition was shored up when the ANDP joined the parliamentary majority coalition, the Alliance of Democratic Forces, leaving the opposition Coordination of Democratic Forces. Djermakoye joined the government as a Minister of State in November 2002, serving in that position until December 2004.

==== 2004 elections ====
While Tandja easily retained the presidency against a second round challenge by Mahamadou Issoufou, the 2004 National Assembly elections were closer. The PNDS formed a coalition to contest the expanded 113 seats of the National Assembly, which also included the UNI (2 seats), the PPN (2), and the PNA-Al'ouma (4). With the PNDS' 17 seats this coalition took 25 seats. The MNSD remained the largest party at 47 seats, be relied again on CDS-Rahama's 22 seats to govern. A minor portfolios in the Council of Ministers were given to two smaller parties as well, the RDP-Jama'a (6 seats) and ANDP-Zaman Lahiya (5 seats). RSD-Gaskiya (7 seats) and PSDN-Alheri (1 seat) remained aloof of both blocs.

==== 2007 PM crisis ====
In December 2004 Hama Amadou was again chosen as Prime Minister. Mahamane Ousmane, the head of the CDS, was re-elected President of the National Assembly. The new second term government of the Fifth Republic took office on 30 December 2004. In June 2007, a no confidence vote against the government led to the fall of the Prime Minister Hama Amadou and his ministers. Amadou was replaced by Seyni Oumarou, also of the president's MNSD-Nassara party, leading to infighting within a portion of the party still loyal to Amadou. Broad changes were made to the Council of Ministers of Niger, with MNSD-Nassara continuing to take the majority of portfolios, but with the CDS, RDP-Jama'a, and NDP-Zaman Lahiya retaining Ministerial appointments.

==== Tazarce ====
In the run up to the 2009 elections (Presidential, Assembly, and Municipal), a movement to draft President Tandja for a third term appeared. Led by public figures of the MNSD outside government, the group took the name of Tandja's 2004 re-election slogan, Tazarce: a Hausa word meaning "Continuity". Through several well funded and well attended public rallies in late 2008, the President remained silent on the calls for him to remain. The 1999 constitution made the serving of more than two term impossible (article 36), and the revision of that article illegal by any means (article 136). The Prime Minister Seyni Oumarou reiterated on 22 January that all scheduled elections would go ahead before the end of 2009. In March, during his meetings with French President Sarkozy, Tandja explicitly stated that he would not seek a third term.

Then, in early May 2009, when questioned by the press on his visit to Agadez to begin peace talks with Tuareg rebels, Tandja announced that "the people have demanded I remain." His spokesman then outlined a plan in which a referendum could be held in mid-2009, not to amend the 1999 constitution, but to scrap it and begin work on a constitution of the Sixth Republic of Niger, which would contain no term limits for the President, and create a fully Presidential republic.

On 15 May 2009, in response to their parties opposition to a proposed referendum to allow the President to seek a third term, the three members of RDP-Jama'a and ANDP-Zaman Lahiya were replaced with ministers drawn from the MNSD-Nassara. With the continued support of the CDS, the MNSD maintained a working majority of 67 seats in the 113 seat National Assembly.

According to the 1999 Constitution of Niger, the President may call a referendum on any matter (except for a revision of those elements of the Constitution outlined in Article 136—including the presidential term limits). The Constitutional Court of Niger and the National Assembly of Niger must advise the president, but there is no provision that the president must heed their advice. On 25 May 2009, the Constitutional Court, made up of appointed judges, released a ruling that any referendum to create a new constitution would be unconstitutional, and further would be a violation of the oath the president had taken on the Koran (a serious matter in this overwhelmingly Muslim country). The week prior, two major parties had come out in their opposition to the referendum proposal as well. On 13 May, the ANDP-Zaman Lahiya, led by former MNSD number two Djermokoye declared its opposition to any change in the constitution. On 15 May the CDS-Rahama, the party without which the MNSD could not have formed governments in 1999, 2004, and 2007, came out opposing the referendum, and calling the constitution unalterable. Neither party moved into the opposition, and both Ousmane and Djermokoye said they were willing to negotiate with the president.

On 26 March, within hours of the Constitutional courts statement, official media read out a statement that President Tandja had dissolved the National Assembly. Under the 1999 Constitution he is allowed to do once every two years, but he must call parliamentary elections with three months. This would mean the government of Niger would carry out scheduled parliamentary elections in September, two months early, and a referendum on a new constitution before Presidential elections which can take place no later than December, assuming the 1999 constitution is in effect.

=== 2010 Coup ===
On February 19 a group calling itself the Supreme Council for Restoration of Democracy (CSRD) stormed the presidential palace during a meeting and took the president Mamadou Tandja hostage. Colonel Goukoye Abdul Karimou, spokesman for CSRD announced on state television that the country's constitution had been suspended and all state institutions dissolved. It is believed that the president is being held in a garrison in the capital city with his resignation being sought.

== Constitution ==
The constitution of December 1992 was revised by national referendum on 12 May 1996 and, again, by referendum, revised to the current version on 18 July 1999. It restored the semi-presidential system of government of the December 1992 constitution (Third Republic) in which the president of the republic, elected by universal suffrage for a five-year term, and a prime minister named by the president share executive power. As a reflection of Niger's increasing population, the unicameral National Assembly was expanded in 2004 to 113 deputies elected for a 5-year term under a majority system of representation. Political parties must attain at least 5% of the vote in order to gain a seat in the legislature.

== Executive branch ==
Main office-holders
Office	Name	Party	Since
President of the National Council for the Safeguard of the Homeland	Abdourahamane Tiani	Niger Armed Forces	26 July 2023
Vice President of the National Council for the Safeguard of the Homeland	Salifou Modi	Niger Armed Forces	26 July 2023
Prime Minister	Vacant		26 July 2023

Niger's new constitution restores the semi-presidential system of government of the December 1992 constitution (Third Republic) in which the President of the Republic is elected by universal suffrage for a five-year term, and a prime minister, named by the president, share executive power.

== Legislative branch ==
The National Assembly (Assemblée Nationale) has 113 members, elected for a five-year term, 105 members elected in multi-seat constituencies and 8 members elected in single-seat national minority constituencies. Political parties must attain at least 5% of the vote in order to gain a seat in the legislature.
