= 1995 Nigerien parliamentary election =

Parliamentary elections were held in Niger on 12 January 1995. The last elections of the Third Republic, they were called following a split in the ruling coalition, but resulted in a government divided between the party of the President and an opposition coalition with a majority in the National Assembly and the post of Prime Minister. The ensuing stalemate was a contributing factor to the coup that overthrew the regime on 27 January 1996.

== Background ==
The elections were prompted by the fall of the Alliance of the Forces of Change (AFC) government, after the Nigerien Party for Democracy and Socialism (PNDS-Tarayya) party of Prime Minister Mahamadou Issoufou moved from the ruling coalition into opposition. President Mahamane Ousmane appointed Souley Abdoulaye as prime minister, but he resigned on 16 October 1994 after failing to create a new ruling coalition which could stand up to a confidence vote in the Assembly. Ousmane called a new election for the National Assembly.

== Results ==
The electoral landscape remained largely unchanged from the 1993 elections. MNSD-Nassara won a plurality of votes, and with its new parliamentary ally and third-place finisher—the Nigerien Party for Democracy and Socialism—forming a parliamentary bloc of 41 of the 83 seats, opposed to 38 seats held by the remaining AFC coalition members. The addition of three smaller parties added four seats, assuring a majority of 45.

| Party | Votes | % | Seats | +/– |
|---|---|---|---|---|
| National Movement for the Society of Development | 467,080 | 32.30 | 29 | 0 |
| Democratic and Social Convention | 428,760 | 29.65 | 24 | +2 |
| Nigerien Party for Democracy and Socialism | 203,629 | 14.08 | 12 | –1 |
| Nigerien Alliance for Democracy and Progress | 186,247 | 12.88 | 9 | –2 |
| Union for Democracy and Social Progress | 45,724 | 3.16 | 2 | +1 |
| Party for National Unity and Democracy | 34,610 | 2.39 | 3 | +3 |
| Party for Socialism and Democracy in Niger | 21,010 | 1.45 | 2 | +1 |
| Nigerien Progressive Party – African Democratic Rally | 18,294 | 1.27 | 1 | –1 |
| Union of Democratic and Progressive Patriots | 13,589 | 0.94 | 1 | –1 |
| Other parties | 27,178 | 1.88 | 0 | – |
| Total | 1,446,121 | 100.00 | 83 | 0 |
| Valid votes | 1,446,121 | 94.51 | | |
| Invalid/blank votes | 84,077 | 5.49 | | |
| Total votes | 1,530,198 | 100.00 | | |
| Registered voters/turnout | 4,376,031 | 34.97 | | |
Source: IPU

== Aftermath ==
The new National Assembly resulted in a divided government ("cohabitation") with the opposition forming the new ruling coalition, and the MNSD-Nassara's Hama Amadou becoming prime minister. This finally reversed the unstable post-dictatorship alliance of the AFC, which had been based upon keeping the MNSD, the former military government party, out of power. The center-right MNSD and the left PNDS formed an otherwise unlikely alliance based on each's conflict with the President. The inability of the president and this new government to work together resulted in government gridlock. This was one of the stated reasons for the 27 January 1996 Nigerien coup d'état which brought the military government of Ibrahim Baré Maïnassara to power.
