= Amadou Cheiffou =

Nigerien politician

Amadou Cheiffou (born 1 December 1942) is a Nigerien politician who was Prime Minister of Niger from 26 October 1991 to 17 April 1993, heading a transitional government. He has led the Social Democratic Rally (RSD-Gaskiya), a political party, since founding it in January 2004. Cheiffou was President of the Economic, Social and Cultural Council of Niger (CESOC) from January 2006 to February 2010, and held the official post of Ombudsman from August 2011 to December 2015.

== Political career ==
An ENAC graduate, Cheiffou is an ethnic Fula and was born at Kornaka, in Maradi Department, in 1942. Prior to becoming prime minister, Cheiffou worked in Dakar as a representative of the International Civil Aviation Organization (ICAO) for Central and West Africa. He was a delegate for the Association of Nigeriens Abroad at the 1991 National Conference; at the Conference, he was the compromise choice for the position of prime minister, although he was opposed by the delegates representing the government, and was elected on 26 October 1991. His selection as prime minister was aided by his political inexperience and lack of association with the old regime of Seyni Kountché and Ali Saibou. Cheiffou headed the transitional government that served from 1991 to 1993, during the transitional period leading to multiparty elections. He also served as Minister of National Defense during that period. Along with President Saibou and André Salifou, the President of the High Council of the Republic, he was prohibited by the National Conference from standing as a candidate in the February 1993 presidential election.

As of 2002, Cheiffou was the ICAO's regional director for its Western and Central African Office.

Cheiffou was vice-president of the Democratic and Social Convention (CDS-Rahama) before splitting with that party and its president, Mahamane Ousmane, and creating his own party, the Social Democratic Rally (RSD-Gaskiya), in January 2004. In the presidential election held on 16 November 2004, Cheiffou placed fourth out of six candidates, winning 6.35% of the vote. He was elected to the National Assembly in the December 2004 parliamentary election as an RSD candidate in Maradi constituency.

When the 85-member Economic, Social and Cultural Council (CESOC) was installed by President Mamadou Tandja on 3 January 2006, Cheiffou became President of CESOC.

The RSD supported President Tandja during the 2009 political crisis, and it participated in the October 2009 parliamentary election. The opposition, angered by President Tandja's efforts to change the constitution so that he could remain in power, boycotted the election. The Economic Community of West African States (ECOWAS), which had wanted the election delayed in hopes of resolving the political crisis, suspended Niger from its ranks immediately after the election was held. Cheiffou was included in the 22-member Nigerien delegation that traveled to Abuja for talks with ECOWAS beginning on 9 November 2009.

Still serving as President of CESOC, Cheiffou stood as a candidate in the December 2009 local elections and was elected as a municipal councillor in Kornaka. Cheiffou's decision to run for local office was considered striking, as it was rare for major political leaders in Niger to do so.

Tandja was ousted in a February 2010 military coup. In the January 2011 presidential election, held under a transitional junta, Cheiffou stood again as a candidate, but received only a small share of the vote. On 10 February 2011, he announced his support for Mahamadou Issoufou, who had placed first, in the March 2011 second round. He backed Issoufou along with many other unsuccessful candidates, buttressing Issoufou's position against his second round opponent, Seyni Oumarou. After Issoufou won the election, Cheiffou was appointed as Ombudsman on 24 August 2011.

On 13 December 2015, Cheiffou was designated as the RSD candidate for the February 2016 presidential election. In light of his candidacy, he submitted his resignation as Ombudsman to President Issoufou on 21 December 2015, although he stressed that he was not legally required to resign. He was elected to the National Assembly in the February 2016 parliamentary election. As the oldest deputy present, he presided over the National Assembly when it began meeting on 24 March 2016, until the election of Ousseini Tinni as President of the National Assembly on 25 March.

Political offices
Preceded by Aliou Mahamidou	Prime Minister of Niger; 1991–1993	Succeeded by Mahamadou Issoufou
