= 2016 Nigerien general election =

- Presidential election
- 21 February 2016 (first round); 20 March 2016 (second round)
- Turnout: 66.82% (first round); 59.81% (second round)
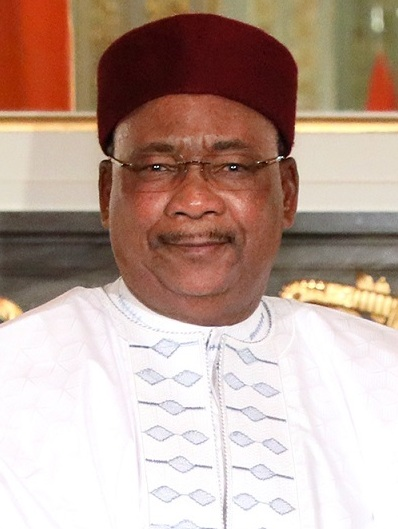

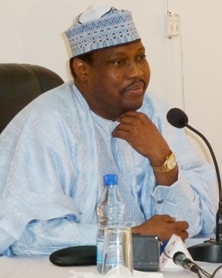
Nominee	Mahamadou Issoufou	Hama Amadou
Party	PNDS	MODEN/FA
Popular vote	4,105,499	333,143
Percentage	92.49%	7.51%
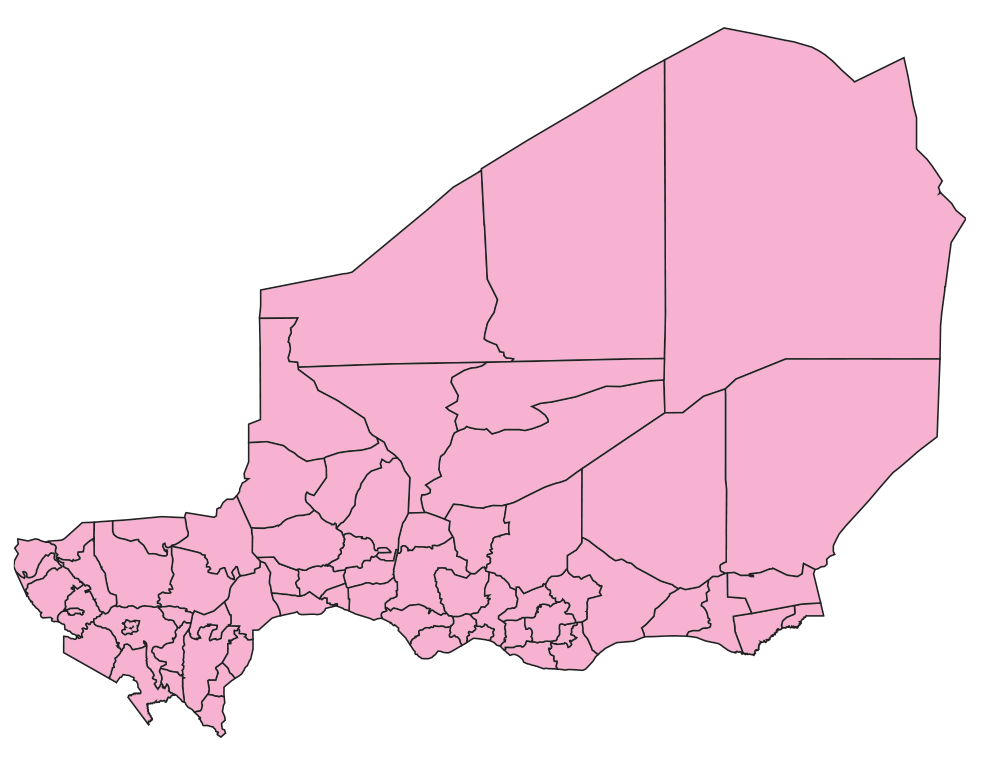
President before election
Mahamadou Issoufou
PNDS
Elected President
Mahamadou Issoufou
PNDS
- Legislative election
- All 171 seats in the National Assembly; 86 seats needed for a majority
- Turnout: 66.40% (▲17.18pp)
Party	Leader	Vote %	Seats	+/–
PNDS	Brigi Rafini	35.72	75	+41
MODEN/FA	Hama Amadou	12.91	25	+2
MNSD	Seyni Oumarou	10.24	20	−5
MPR-Jamhuriya	Albadé Abouba	7.20	13	New
MNRD–PSDN	Issaka Labo	4.16	6	+6
MPN	Ibrahim Yacouba	3.19	5	New
AMEN-AMIN	Oumarou Hamidou Tchiana	3.00	3	New
ANDP-Zaman Lahiya	Moussa Hassane Barazé	2.96	4	−4
RSD-Gaskiya	Amadou Cheiffou	2.90	4	+4
CPR-Inganci	Kassoum Moctar	2.57	3	New
CDS-Rahama	Abdou Labo	2.40	3	0
RDP-Jama'a	Hamid Algabid	2.37	3	−4
UDR-Tabbat	Amadou Cissé	2.21	2	−4
ADN-Fusaha	Habi Mahamadou Salissou	1.58	1	New
ARD Adaltchi-Mutuntchi	Laouan Magagi	1.47	2	+2
PSD-Bassira	Mohamed Ben Omar	0.91	2	New
This lists parties that won seats. See the complete results below.
Results by constituency
Prime Minister before	Prime Minister after
Brigi Rafini; PNDS	Brigi Rafini; PNDS

General elections were held in Niger on 21 February 2016, with a presidential run-off held on 20 March. A total of 15 candidates ran for the presidency, with incumbent President Mahamadou Issoufou running for re-election for a second term. There were two main opposition candidates also vying for the top post, Seyni Oumarou of the National Movement for the Society of Development (MNSD), who lost to Issoufou in 2011, and Hama Amadou of MODEN/FA, who has been campaigning from prison since November 2015. Most of the opposition agreed to align for the second round to back the second-placed candidate against Issoufou.

Niger faced a string of attacks by various insurgents, most notably Boko Haram in the preceding months, and security and poverty alleviation were central to most candidates' campaigns. Various observers predicted minor violence from the opposition who accused the president of rigging the elections.

Issoufou placed first in the first round, but fell just short of an outright majority, necessitating a second round vote in which he faced Hama Amadou. The opposition boycotted the second round, and Issoufou was re-elected with an overwhelming majority (92.49%).

== Electoral system ==
The President of Niger was elected using the two-round system.

The 171 members of the National Assembly were elected by two methods; 158 members were elected from eight multi-member constituencies based on the seven regions and Niamey by party-list proportional representation. Additionally, eight seats are reserved for national minorities and five seats (one per continent) for Nigeriens living abroad, all elected in single-member constituencies by first-past-the-post voting.

== Presidential candidates ==
- Mahamadou Issoufou, the incumbent president, ran for a second term. He was designated as the candidate of his party, the Nigerien Party for Democracy and Socialism (PNDS), on 7 November 2015.
- Seyni Oumarou, former Prime Minister (2007–2009), was designated as the candidate of the MNSD on 29 November 2015.
- Amadou Cissé, former Prime Minister (1996–1997), candidate for the Union for Democracy and the Republic.
- Abdou Labo was designated as the candidate of the Democratic and Social Convention (CDS) on 14 November 2015.
- Mahamane Ousmane, former president (1993–1996), candidate for the Nigerien Movement for Democratic Renewal (MNDR).
- Hama Amadou, former prime minister (1995–1996, 2000–2007), returned from exile on 14 November 2015, planning to stand as the presidential candidate of his party, the Nigerien Democratic Movement for an African Federation, but he was immediately arrested upon arrival at the airport in Niamey in connection with the allegations of involvement in baby-trafficking that had led him to flee into exile in 2014.

On 9 January 2016, it was announced that the Constitutional Court had cleared 15 candidates to run. All of the major candidates were approved, including Hama Amadou, who was still in jail over charges that he alleged were politically motivated, and Abdou Labo, who was not imprisoned but was also facing charges related to the baby-trafficking investigation. One minor candidate, Abdoul-Karim Bakasso, was barred from running on the grounds that he had not submitted a medical certificate.

An appeals court refused Amadou's request to be released on 11 January. Speaking through his lawyer, Amadou said afterward that he was a political prisoner and would not pursue any further appeal.

== Results ==
=== President ===
Provisional results released on 26 February 2016 showed President Issoufou with about 48% of the vote, falling just short of a first round majority. Imprisoned opposition leader Hama Amadou placed second with 17.8% of the vote. With no candidate winning an outright majority, a second round was planned to be held on 20 March 2016. Although Amadou received a much smaller percentage of the first round vote, most of the other major opposition candidates were expected to support him in the second round.

Speaking on behalf of COPA 2016, the opposition coalition supporting Amadou, Seyni Oumarou (who placed third and backed Amadou for the second round), announced on 8 March that the coalition was boycotting the vote and withdrawing its representatives from the electoral commission. Hassoumi Massaoudou, the Minister of the Interior, said in response that the second round vote would be held regardless of whether the opposition participated. Noting that some of the first round candidates had backed Issoufou, Massaoudou argued that the opposition "withdrew to avoid being beaten". Nevertheless, Amadou's lawyer said on 11 March that he would still be a candidate.

Subsequent events were dominated by Amadou's health problems. After a medical crisis in which he was said to have briefly lost consciousness, he was moved from the prison in Filingue to Niamey; he was then taken to Paris for treatment on 16 March. COPA again called for a boycott on 18 March.

The second round was held on 20 March 2016 amidst an opposition boycott. Given the boycott, results announced on 22 March showed an unsurprisingly large victory for President Issoufou, who was credited with 92.5% of the vote. Turnout was placed at 60%. Meanwhile, on 22 March COPA denounced the election as fraudulent and rejected the results, saying that Niger would "have no legitimate president" after Issoufou's first term ended.

Candidate	Party	First round		Second round	
Candidate	Party	Votes	%	Votes	%
Mahamadou Issoufou	Nigerien Party for Democracy and Socialism	2,252,016	48.43	4,102,363	92.51
Hama Amadou	Nigerien Democratic Movement for an African Federation	824,500	17.73	332,292	7.49
Seyni Oumarou	National Movement for the Society of Development	563,613	12.12		
Mahamane Ousmane	Nigerien Movement for Democratic Renewal	290,688	6.25		
Ibrahim Yacouba	Nigerien Patriotic Movement	201,982	4.34		
Kassoum Moctar	Congress for the Republic	135,176	2.91		
Abdou Labo	Democratic and Social Convention	97,382	2.09		
Amadou Cheiffou	Social Democratic Rally	82,965	1.78		
Amadou Cissé	Union for Democracy and the Republic	69,115	1.49		
Laouan Magagi	Alliance for Democratic Renewal	44,685	0.96		
Adal Rhoubeid	Democratic Movement for Renewal	27,350	0.59		
Abdoulaye Amadou Traoré	Party of Progress for a United Niger	18,681	0.40		
Tahirou Guimba	Democratic Movement for Development and the Defence of Liberties	18,335	0.39		
Mahaman Jean Philipe Padonou	Convergence for Democracy and Progress	16,508	0.35		
Mahaman Hamissou Maman	Justice and Development Party	7,211	0.16		
Total		4,650,207	100.00	4,434,655	100.00
Valid votes		4,650,207	91.80	4,434,655	97.80
Invalid/blank votes		415,249	8.20	99,761	2.20
Total votes		5,065,456	100.00	4,534,416	100.00
Registered voters/turnout		7,580,598	66.82	7,581,540	59.81
Source: Constitutional Court - First round, Constitutional Court - Second round

=== National Assembly ===
In the parliamentary election, parties supporting Issoufou won a majority, with 118 out of 171 seats in the National Assembly.

Party	Votes	%	Seats	+/–
Nigerien Party for Democracy and Socialism	1,703,321	35.72	75	+41
Nigerien Democratic Movement for an African Federation	615,393	12.91	25	+2
National Movement for the Society of Development	488,502	10.24	20	–5
Patriotic Movement for the Republic	343,150	7.20	13	New
MNRD–PSDN	198,164	4.16	6	+6
Nigerien Patriotic Movement	152,252	3.19	5	New
Alliance of Movements for the Emergence of Niger	142,934	3.00	3	New
Nigerien Alliance for Democracy and Progress	141,031	2.96	4	–4
Social Democratic Rally	138,065	2.90	4	+4
Congress for the Republic	122,573	2.57	3	New
Democratic and Social Convention	114,403	2.40	3	0
Rally for Democracy and Progress	113,141	2.37	3	–4
Union for Democracy and the Republic	105,448	2.21	2	–4
Democratic Alliance for Niger	75,372	1.58	1	New
Alliance for Democratic Renewal	69,971	1.47	2	+2
Social Democratic Party	43,285	0.91	2	New
Party for National Unity and Democracy	24,958	0.52	0	New
Nigerien Progressive Party – African Democratic Rally	23,048	0.48	0	0
Nigerien Self-Management Party	22,426	0.47	0	0
Convergence for Democracy and Progress	17,129	0.36	0	New
People's Democratic Party	16,710	0.35	0	0
New Generation for Niger	16,239	0.34	0	New
Union of Independent Nigeriens	13,365	0.28	0	–1
Movement for Democracy and Reform	12,976	0.27	0	New
Socio-Revolutionary Movement for Democracy	11,302	0.24	0	New
Movement for Unity and Recovery of the Nation	8,795	0.18	0	New
IPP/RAYUWA	8,359	0.18	0	New
Democratic Movement for Renewal	6,535	0.14	0	New
Union of Socialist Nigeriens	5,153	0.11	0	0
National Movement for Reform and Social Progress	4,988	0.10	0	New
Union for Democracy and Social Progress	4,262	0.09	0	New
Party of Consultation and Peace	2,405	0.05	0	New
Socialist Party	2,377	0.05	0	New
Rally of Nigerien Democrats for Reform	364	0.01	0	0
Nigerien Convention for the Republic	75	0.00	0	0
GIE Bunkasa	18	0.00	0	New
Democratic and Renewal Congress	13	0.00	0	New
Independents	113	0.00	0	0
Total	4,768,615	100.00	171	+58
Valid votes	4,768,615	94.81		
Invalid/blank votes	261,071	5.19		
Total votes	5,029,686	100.00		
Registered voters/turnout	7,574,958	66.40		
Source: Constitutional Court

== Reactions ==
=== Domestic ===
Opposition parties rejected the partial election results released by the electoral commission, claiming discrepancies between the declared results and their own tallies. Amadou Cissé, the Union for Democracy and the Republic candidate, challenged the results and accused the government for creating "thousands of polling stations" to skew the outcome.

=== International ===
- African Union – The African Union team of 40 observers was satisfied with the electoral process of the first round of elections despite all the logistical delays.

== Aftermath ==
When the National Assembly began meeting for its new term on 24 March 2016, the opposition deputies boycotted it. Ousseini Tinni, a PNDS Deputy, was elected as President of the National Assembly on 25 March 2016. With the opposition absent, Tinni received 109 votes in favor and six against, with three abstentions.

The Niamey Court of Appeal issued an order for the "provisional release" of Amadou on 29 March 2016, although by that point he had already been out of the country for nearly two weeks.

On 30 March 2016, the Constitutional Court validated the results and formally declared that Issoufou was re-elected for a second term. Final results showed Issoufou with 92.51% and Amadou with 7.49%, while turnout was placed at 59.80%. On 2 April 2016, Issoufou was sworn in and reappointed Brigi Rafini as Prime Minister.

The composition of the new government was announced on 11 April. Although Issoufou had previously called for the opposition to join a national unity government, ultimately no one from the opposition was included in the government, which continued to be dominated by members of the PNDS. Three minor presidential candidates who had backed Issoufou for the second round were appointed to the government: Ibrahim Yacoubou as Minister of Foreign Affairs, Moctar Kassoum as Minister of Lands and Urban Development, and Magagi Laouan as Minister of Humanitarian Action and Disaster Management.

The opposition deputies eventually took their seats in the National Assembly. In late April they formed two parliamentary groups and put forward candidates for the posts in the Bureau of the National Assembly which had been reserved for the opposition and therefore left vacant, enabling those posts (Second Vice-President, Third Vice-President, Quaestor, and two Parliamentary Secretaries) to be filled.
