= Abdou Labo =

Nigerien politician

Minister of State for Agriculture
- In office 2013–2014
- President: Mahamadou Issoufou

Minister of State for the Interior
- In office 2011–2013
- President: Mahamadou Issoufou

Minister of State for Hydraulics
- In office 2004–2007
- President: Mamadou Tandja

Minister of State for Sports and Culture
- In office 2002–2004
- President: Mamadou Tandja

Minister of Equipment
- In office 2000–2002
- President: Mamadou Tandja

Minister of Defense
- In office 1994–1995
- President: Mamadou Tandja

Personal details
- Born: 1950 (age 75–76) N'guigmi, Diffa, Niger
- Party: Democratic and Social Convention
- Education: African School of Meteorology and Civil Aviation, National University of Zaire, Aix-Marseille University

Abdou Labo (born 1950 in N'guigmi) is a Nigerien politician and a member of the Democratic and Social Convention (CDS-Rahama). He briefly served in the government of Niger as Minister of Defense from 1994 to 1995, and under President Mamadou Tandja he held a succession of ministerial posts in the 2000s: he was Minister of Equipment from 2000 to 2002, Minister of State for Sports and Culture from 2002 to 2004, and Minister of State for Hydraulics from 2004 to 2007. Later, under President Mahamadou Issoufou, he served as Minister of State for the Interior from 2011 to 2013 and as Minister of State for Agriculture from 2013 to 2014.

== Political career ==
Following the 1993 elections, in which CDS leader Mahamane Ousmane was elected as President of Niger and the coalition that included the CDS won a parliamentary majority, Labo was appointed as Secretary of State for Communication, working under the Minister of Communication, Culture, Youth and Sports, Hassoumi Massoudou, on 23 April 1993. He served in that position until being appointed as Minister of National Defense in the government of Prime Minister Souley Abdoulaye on 5 October 1994; that government served only briefly, however, and Labo left the government after the CDS lost the January 1995 parliamentary election.

The 1999 parliamentary election was won by an alliance of the National Movement for the Development of Society (MNSD) and the CDS, and Labo was appointed as Minister of Equipment and Transport on 5 January 2000. His ministerial portfolio was modified on 17 September 2001, when he was appointed as Minister of Equipment, Housing, and Territorial Administration, and on 8 November 2002 he was promoted to the post of Minister of State for Sports, Culture, and the Francophone Games. Following the December 2004 parliamentary election, in which Labo was elected as a CDS candidate to the National Assembly from Maradi constituency, Labo remained in the government and was appointed as Minister of State for Hydraulics, the Environment, and the Fight Against Desertification on 30 December 2004.

In the government named on 1 March 2007, Labo remained Minister of State but was left in charge of only hydraulics. He was the second ranking member of government, after Prime Minister Hama Amadou. He was not included in the government of Prime Minister Seyni Oumarou, which was appointed on 9 June 2007 following a no-confidence vote against the previous government. President Mamadou Tandja decided on that occasion that ministers who had served in the government for over five years should be excluded from it.

Labo became a National Vice-president of the CDS, representing Maradi Department, in 2002.

Although the CDS and its president, Mahamane Ousmane, backed Seyni Oumarou for the second round of the January–March 2011 presidential election, Labo supported Oumarou's opponent, Mahamadou Issoufou. Issoufou won the election and took office as president on 7 April 2011; he then appointed Labo to the government as Minister of State for the Interior, Public Security, Decentralization, and Religious Affairs on 21 April 2011.

Labo was moved to the post of Minister of State for Agriculture on 13 August 2013; Hassoumi Massoudou replaced him at the Interior Ministry.

In 2015, Labo was designated as the CDS candidate for the 2016 presidential election, defeating Mahamane Ousmane, who was subsequently designated as the candidate of another party.

== Trafficking ==
Labo's wife was arrested in June 2014 in connection with an investigation into the trafficking of infants from "baby factories" in Nigeria, where the children were born to captive girls and then sold. Labo denied being involved with the illegal network, but he was also arrested in August 2014. He was promptly dismissed from the government on 25 August 2014 and replaced by Maidagi Allambeye, another member of the CDS.

In 2017, Labo entered Say Prison along with more than 20 others for involvement in trafficking. He served one year.
