= Moussa Moumouni Djermakoye =

Nigerien politician

Moussa Moumouni Djermakoye (26 April 1944 – 19 November 2017) was a Nigerien politician who was President of the Nigerien Alliance for Democracy and Progress (ANDP-Zaman Lahiya), a political party in Niger, from 2010 to 2017. As a high-ranking army officer, he was Army Chief of Staff for a time and also briefly served as Minister of National Defense in 1999 as part of a transitional military regime. After retiring from the army and beginning a political career, he stood as the ANDP's candidate in the 2011 presidential election, winning only a small share of the vote. From December 2011 to 2017, he was President of the Economic, Social and Cultural Council of Niger (CESOC).

== Military and political career ==
As an army officer with the rank of colonel, Moussa Moumouni Djermakoye was the Army Chief of Staff at the time of the assassination of President Ibrahim Bare Mainassara by soldiers undertaking a coup d'etat on 9 April 1999. Amidst the confusion that followed the coup, it was suggested that he might head the junta that took power, but instead he was appointed as Minister of National Defense in the junta's transitional government, appointed a week after the coup. The transition ended with the swearing-in of an elected President, Mamadou Tandja, on 22 December 1999.

Djermakoye is the brother of Moumouni Adamou Djermakoye, who led the ANDP, a political party, from the time of its creation in the early 1990s until his death in June 2009. Following a coup that ousted Tandja in February 2010, Djermakoye was appointed as Special Adviser to the President of the Supreme Council for the Restoration of Democracy, Salou Djibo, in March 2010.

Djermakoye, having retired from the military, was elected to succeed his brother as ANDP President at an extraordinary party congress on 20 June 2010. He won the vote easily; he received 278 votes, while Amadou Nouhou received 85 votes and Ali Seyni Gado received 66 votes. Speaking to Le Sahel after the congress, he said that he did not find it very remarkable that he had shifted from a career in the military to the leadership of a political party. Although he lacked elective political experience due to his service in the military, he observed that he had nevertheless held administrative posts during periods of military rule and therefore felt he was sufficiently experienced for the role. He was subsequently nominated to stand as the ANDP candidate in the January 2011 presidential election, and the Transitional Constitutional Council approved his candidacy, along with nine others, on 22 December 2010.

In the first round of the presidential election, held on 31 January 2011, Djermakoye received 3.95% of the vote. On 10 February 2011, he announced his support for the candidacy of the first round's leading candidate, Mahamadou Issoufou, in the second round. Djermakoye was one of several unsuccessful first round candidates who gave their support to Issoufou at that time, helping to give the momentum to Issoufou in his second round campaign against Seyni Oumarou.

Djermakoye also stood as an ANDP candidate in the January 2011 parliamentary election and was elected to the National Assembly. He was appointed as President of the Economic, Social and Cultural Council, a state institution, on 9 December 2011. Consequently he vacated his parliamentary seat.

At the ANDP's Sixth Ordinary Congress, held in Maradi on 9–10 May 2015, Djermakoye was re-elected as President of the ANDP. Djermakoye did not stand again as a candidate for the February 2016 presidential election, as the ANDP opted to endorse the candidacy of incumbent President Mahamadou Issoufou in the first round of voting.

He died on 19 November 2017 in Paris, France at the age of 73.

== Distinctions ==
Moussa Moumouni Djermakoye has received several awards and medals:

- Officer in the Order of the International Council of Military Sports (CISM)
- Officer in the Order of Burkina Faso
- Officer in the National Order of Mono of the Republic of Togo
- Commander of the Academic Palms of Niger
- Knight in the National Order of the French Legion of Honour
- Knight in the National Order of Merit of the Federal Republic of Germany (FRG)
- Great Cross in the National Order of Niger
