= Nigerien Movement for Democratic Renewal =

Political party in Niger

The Nigerien Movement for Democratic Renewal (French: Mouvement nigérien pour le renouveau démocratique, MNRD-Hankuri) is a political party in Niger.

== History ==
The MNRD was established in 2009. It did not contest the 2011 general elections, but nominated Mahamane Ousmane as its presidential candidate in the 2016 general elections, but he failed to progress to the second round. It contested the National Assembly in alliance with the Party for Socialism and Democracy in Niger, with the joint slate winning six seats.
