= Democratic Alliance for Niger =

Political party in Niger

The Democratic Alliance for Niger (French: Alliance démocratique pour le Niger, ADN-Fusaha) is a political party in Niger.

== History ==
The ADN was established in 2014 by Minister of Urban Development and Housing Habi Mahamadou Salissou.

It did not nominate a presidential candidate in the 2016 general elections, but won a single seat in the National Assembly.
