= Brigi Rafini =

Prime Minister of Niger (2011–2021)

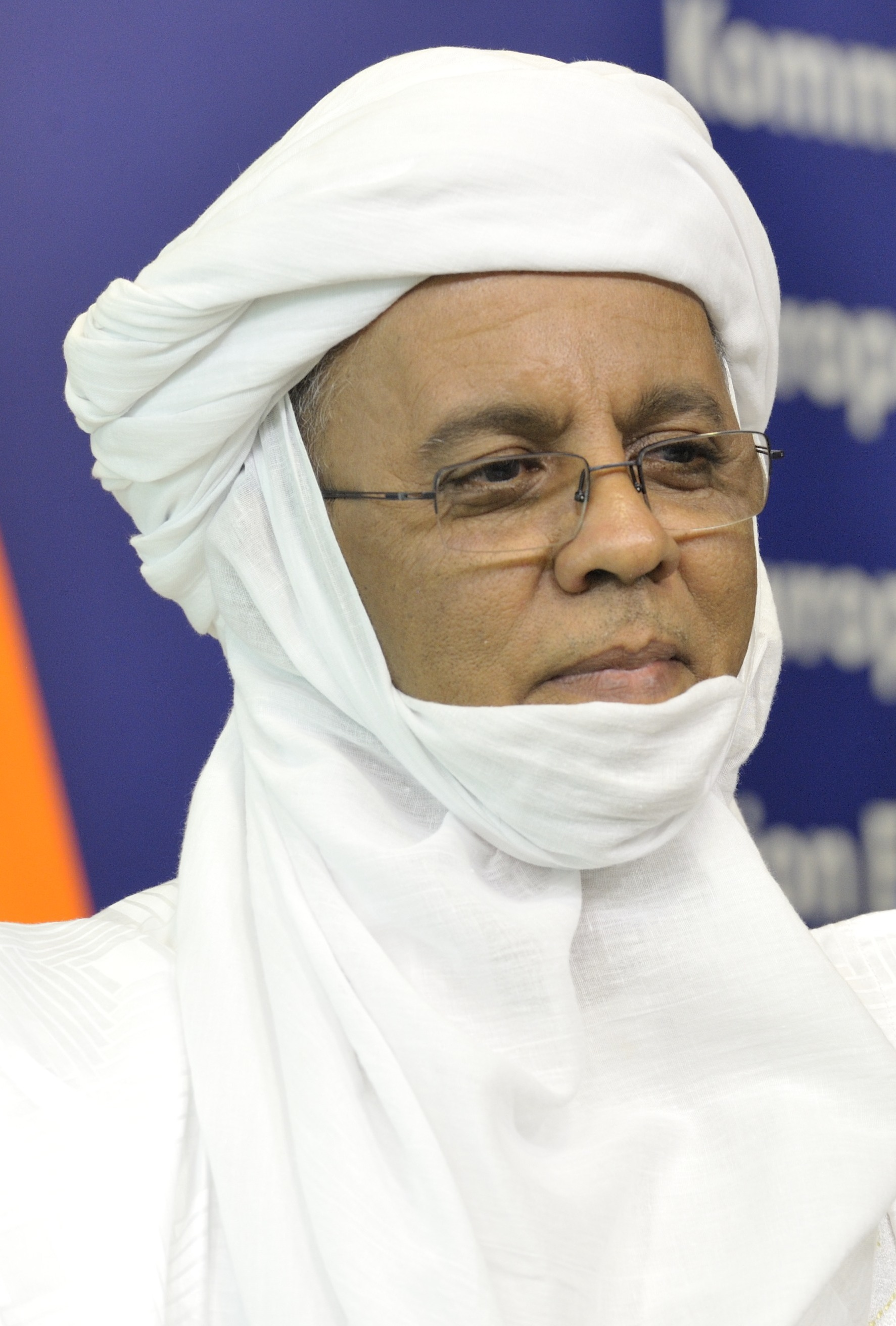
- Brigi Rafini in 2012

Prime Minister of Niger
- In office 7 April 2011 – 2 April 2021
- President: Mahamadou Issoufou
- Preceded by: Mahamadou Danda
- Succeeded by: Ouhoumoudou Mahamadou

Personal details
- Born: 29 March 1953 (age 73) Iferouane, French West Africa (now Niger)
- Party: Nigerien Party for Democracy and Socialism
- Education: National School of Administration, Niamey; National School of Administration, Strasbourg

Brigi Rafini (born 29 March 1953) is a politician in Niger who served as the Prime Minister of Niger from 2011 to 2021. A native of Iférouane in Agadez Region and an ethnic Tuareg, Rafini was Minister of Agriculture in the late 1980s and Fourth Vice-President of the National Assembly of Niger from 2004 to 2009. He was appointed as prime minister after Mahamadou Issoufou took office as president on 7 April 2011. He is also notably the first Tuareg in office.

== Career ==
Brigi Rafini was born in 1953 in Iférouane in the Agadez Region, part of the Colony of Niger in French West Africa. He attended primary and secondary school in Iférouane and Agadez. From 1971 to 1974, he attended the National School of Administration (ENA) in Niamey, returning for advanced study from 1978 to 1981. In 1983, he spent a year at the French International Institute of Public Administration (IIAP) in Paris. He returned to Paris a decade later, to the French National School of Administration (ENA) from 1994 to 1995.

== Political affiliation ==
As an experienced civil administrator, minister and political office holder, Rafini has represented four different political parties since the 1980s. He was a member of the National Movement for the Development of Society (MNSD) during the time it was the unitary party (1989–1991), left to join the breakaway faction that became the Nigerien Alliance for Democracy and Progress (ANDP) during the democratic Third Republic (1993–1996), and helped form the ruling Rally for Democracy and Progress (RDP-Jama'a) party during the presidency of Ibrahim Baré Maïnassara (1996–1999). He served as a parliamentarian and assembly officer under the RDP in opposition during the Fifth Republic (1999–2009). He has since been reported to have formally joined the Nigerien Party for Democracy and Socialism (PNDS), elected to power in 2011.

== Prime minister ==
When Mahamadou Issoufou, who won the January–March 2011 presidential election, took office as President on 7 April 2011, he promptly appointed Rafini as Prime Minister. The 23-member government headed by Rafini was appointed on 21 April 2011. On 2 April 2016, when Issoufou was sworn in for a second term, he reappointed Brigi Rafini as Prime Minister.

Political offices
Preceded by Mahamadou Danda	Prime Minister of Niger; 2011–2021	Succeeded by Ouhoumoudou Mahamadou
