= Souley Abdoulaye =

Nigerien politician (1956–2023)

Prime Minister of Niger
- In office 28 September 1994 – 8 February 1995
- President: Mahamane Ousmane
- Preceded by: Mahamadou Issoufou
- Succeeded by: Amadou Cissé

Minister of Transport
- In office 1996–1997
- President: Ibrahim Baré Maïnassara

Minister of the Interior
- In office 1997–1999
- President: Ibrahim Baré Maïnassara

Personal details
- Born: 1956
- Died: 1 March 2023 (aged 66–67) Paris, France
- Party: Democratic and Social Convention-Rahama

Souley Abdoulaye (1956 – 1 March 2023) was a Nigerien politician. He served as the prime minister of Niger from 28 September 1994 to 8 February 1995. He later served in the government under President Ibrahim Baré Maïnassara as Minister of Transport from 1996 to 1997 and then as Minister of the Interior, in charge of police and internal security, from 1997 to 1999.

== Minister of Trade, Transport, and Tourism ==
A member of the Democratic and Social Convention-Rahama (CDS), Abdoulaye was named Minister of Trade, Transport, and Tourism on 23 April 1993, part of the government of the Alliance of the Forces of Change (AFC), a coalition of parties that included the CDS, under Prime Minister Mahamadou Issoufou. This followed the victory of Mahamane Ousmane, the CDS leader, in the second round of the presidential election in March. Abdoulaye was considered close to Ousmane, serving as his campaign manager and as the treasurer of the CDS.

As Minister of Trade, Transport, and Tourism, Abdoulaye participated in negotiations with Nigerian hijackers who had diverted a plane on a domestic flight in Nigeria to Niamey in October 1993. Most of the passengers were released following negotiations, and the remainder were freed during a commando raid on the fourth day of the hijacking after Abdoulaye and fellow negotiators engaged in onboard negotiations and were able to assess the plane's interior.

== Prime minister ==
Ousmane appointed Abdoulaye as prime minister following the resignation of Issoufou in September 1994 amid charges by Issoufou that Ousmane had taken overly broad presidential powers. Issoufou's party, the Nigerien Party for Democracy and Socialism, also quit the AFC coalition, leaving it without a parliamentary majority. Abdoulaye's government was named on 5 October, but, lacking a parliamentary majority, on 16 October it was defeated in a no-confidence vote, with 46 deputies (out of 82 present) against it, and resigned. Abdoulaye was promptly reappointed as prime minister by Ousmane on 17 October, but as a result of the no-confidence vote, Ousmane had to call a new parliamentary election, which was held in January 1995.

== Under Maïnassara ==
Ibrahim Baré Maïnassara seized power in a military coup in January 1996, ousting Ousmane. On 23 August 1996, Abdoulaye was named Minister of Transport in a government headed by Prime Minister Boukary Adji and appointed by President Maïnassara. In joining the government under Maïnassara, Abdoulaye split from the CDS. After over a year as Minister of Transport, he was moved to the post of Minister of the Interior in the government of Prime Minister Ibrahim Hassane Mayaki on 1 December 1997.

As Interior Minister, Abdoulaye was the public face of the security forces. He was widely criticized when, on 20 August 1998, he had Bory Seyni, the editor of Le Democrate independent paper, arrested, following the paper's accusation that the Interior Minister had benefited from the sale of government wheat supplies. According to Seyni and observers in the government offices, the journalist was brought handcuffed to Abdoulaye, where the minister beat him severely with a leather crop. According to Seyni, it was only the physical intervention of several Ministry employees which stopped the beating. At the same time, Abdoulaye ordered increasingly severe measures against opposition parties, culminating in the arrest of four senior party leaders in April 1998, including former prime minister Hama Amadou, following a series of protests in Zinder. He had also previously garnered international attention by accusing the governments of the United States, Denmark and Canada of plotting with opposition parties.

== After Maïnassara ==
When Maïnassara, who had come to power in a 1996 military coup, was assassinated by the army on 9 April 1999, Souley Abdoulaye lost his position in the government and found himself in the political wilderness. All of Maïnassara's ministers, Abdoulaye included, were banned from leaving Niamey and were to be investigated for crimes under the previous regime. Abdoulaye was briefly arrested in May 1999, but released without charge. A member of the Rally for Democracy and Progress (RDP-Jama'a), which had been established as the ruling party under Maïnassara, Abdoulaye was arrested again in August 1999 and questioned by the government about purported vote rigging in the February 1999 local elections in the town of Tahoua. He was again released without charge, but did not return to the National Assembly in the 1999 or 2004 elections.

Political offices
Preceded by Mahamadou Issoufou	Prime Minister of Niger; 1994–1995	Succeeded by Amadou Cissé
