= Ministry of Communication, responsible for Relations with Institutions =

Government Ministry in Niger Republic

Ministry of Communication, in charge of Relations with Institutions
- Ministère de la Communication, chargé des Relations avec les institutions (French)

Ministry overview
- Jurisdiction: Government of Niger
- Headquarters: Niamey, Niger
- Minister responsible: Adji Ali Salatou, Minister of Communication, Posts and Digital Economy
- Website: www.gouv.ne

Ministry of Communication, in charge of Relations with Institutions (French: Ministère de la Communication, chargé des Relations avec les institutions) is the government ministry of the Republic of Niger responsible for national communication policy and for managing the government's relations with public institutions, both inside and outside the national territory.

== Description ==
The ministry develops and implements government communication strategies, coordinates relations with national institutions (including public broadcasters and press agencies), and represents the government's communication interests in international institutional relations.

=== Headquarters ===
The ministry's headquarters are located in Niamey, the capital city of Niger.

=== Responsibilities ===
- Formulation and coordination of national communication and public information policy.
- Management of official relations between the Government of Niger and national institutions (press agencies, public broadcasters, state communications agencies).
- Representation and liaison with international institutions on matters of information, media and communications.
- Oversight of posts, telecommunications and digital information technologies when those portfolios are attached to the ministerial post.

== Ministers ==
- Adji Ali Salatou — Minister of Communication, Posts and Digital Economy (current).

== See also ==
- Politics of Niger
- Le Sahel
