= Mariama Gamatié Bayard =

Nigerien politician

- Born: 1958; Maradi, Niger
- Occupations: Politician and activist

Mariama Gamatié Bayard (born 1958 in Maradi) is a Nigerien politician and women's rights activist.

== Early life and education ==
Bayard was born in 1958 in Maradi, Niger. She completed her education in 1976 at the Lycée Kassaï in Niamey. She studied economics and sociology at the University of Montpellier in France. In 1985, she received a doctorate in international relations at the International Institute of International Relations of Cameroon.

== Career ==
Bayard worked as a consultant on development and gender issues and founded the women's organization Rassemblement Démocratique des Femmes Nigériennes (RDFN) in 1992. She attended the National Conference of 1991, which organized the democratic transition of Niger after the military regime that had been in force since 1974, and led the Commission on Rural Development.

On 13 June 1997, Bayard was appointed as Minister of Communication and Culture and as a government spokeswoman in the government of Prime Minister Amadou Cissé under President Ibrahim Baré Maïnassara. She held this office until 1 December 1997. During her time in office, she organized a national festival of traditional Nigerien dance and music in Zinder, which earned her the nickname "Marraine des Arts du Niger" (Godmother of the Arts in Niger). She also oversaw the introduction of mobile phones into the country.

After 2000, Bayard worked for the United Nations including as deputy representative of the UN Secretary-General in Guinea-Bissau (2004–2005), as director of the political department of the UN activities in the Ivory Coast (2005–2007), for the Integrated United Nations office in Burundi (2007–2008) and for the UNDP Centre in Dakar (2008–2009).

Bayard returned to Niger in 2009. In October 2009, she was beaten and hospitalised at a demonstration against President Mamadou Tandja. She ran as a candidate in the presidential elections in Niger in 2011 after the overthrow of Tandja for the Alliance of Independent candidates for a new Niger (Racinn-Hadin'Kay). She was the first woman to run for the office of president in Niger. She received 0.38% of the vote and placed last. As of 2015, she is president of Racinn Hadin'Kay. She decided not to run in the 2016 election after criticising the government for impeding all opposition, saying "I do not want to be there, so that one can say, yes, there is also a woman."

== Personal life ==
Bayard is married and has three children.
