= Youri =

Youri may refer to:

== Places ==
- Youri, Mali, a small town and commune in south-western Mali
- Youri, Niger, a village and rural commune in Niger

== People ==
- Youri Djorkaeff (born 1968), former French-Armenian football player
- Youri Mulder (born 1969), former Dutch footballer
- Youri Stepkine (born 1971), a Russian judoka
- Youri Egorov (1954–1988), Soviet classical pianist
- Youri Moltchan (born 1983), Russian foil fencer
- Youri Sedykh (born 1955), a former Soviet/Ukrainian athlete
- Youri Messen-Jaschin (born 1941), Swiss artist of Latvian origin
- Youri Tielemans (born 1997), Belgian football midfielder
- Yourii Litvinov (born 1978), Kazakhstani figure skater
- Youri Ziffzer (born 1986), German ice hockey goaltender
