= Antoine Anfré =

French diplomat

Antoine Anfré is a French diplomat, currently serving as ambassador to Rwanda.

== Career ==
Between 1987 and 1991, he served as a secretary to the French ambassador in Kampala, Uganda. In summer 1991, while serving as a staffer in African affairs in the French Ministry of Europe and Foreign Affairs, he wrote two memos warning the French government about its affairs in Rwanda, noting the risk of violence in the region and calling for a change in the French government's policies towards the region.

From 2000 to 2003, he served as subprefect of Limoux. From 2011 to 2014, he served as a counsellor in the French embassy in London, in the United Kingdom.

In February 2014 he was named as French ambassador to Niger. In July 2015, he was replaced after disputes between him and the Nigerien government over democratic standards of the upcoming 2016 Nigerien general election.

On 27 May 2021, French president Emmanuel Macron announced that France would be appointing an ambassador to Rwanda for the first time since 2015, the post having sat empty for six years due to tensions between the two countries. On 12 June, Anfré was confirmed as the government's choice for ambassador.
