= Hama Assah =

Nigerien politician

Hama Assah is a Nigerien lawmaker, and head of the defense and security committee of the National Assembly.
