= Alliance for Democratic Renewal =

Political party in Niger

The Alliance for Democratic Renewal (French: Alliance pour le renouveau démocratique, ARD Adaltchi-Mutuntchi) is a political party in Niger.

== History ==
The party was established in 2010. In the 2011 general elections it nominated Ousmane Issoufou Oubandawaki as its presidential candidate; he finished seventh in a field of ten candidates with 2% of the vote. The party received only 0.5% of the National Assembly vote, failing to win a seat.

The party nominated Laouan Magagi as its presidential candidate in the 2016 general elections, but he failed to progress to the second round of voting. However, the party won two seats in the National Assembly after increasing its vote share to 1.5%. The party supported incumbent President Mahamadou Issoufou in the second round of voting. In April 2016, Issoufou appointed Magagi to the government as Minister of Humanitarian Action and Disaster Management.
