= Hamsou Garba =

Nigerien singer (1958–2022)

- Born: 1958 December 25
- Died: 2022 December 5
- Citizenship: Nigerien
- Occupation: Singer

Hamsou Garba (sometimes Habsou) (25 December 1958 – 5 December 2022) was a Nigerien singer.

== Early life ==
A native of Maradi, Garba attended a French-run schoo. She then transferring to an Arabic-French madrassa instead, which afforded her the opportunity to sing.

== Career ==
Her emergence as a performer was so politically important that she was granted a state position. Besides singing, she worked as a talk radio host; she performed with the group Anashua or Annashuwa, of which she was a founding member in 1991. Her first album, Gargadi, was released in 2008; it was followed in 2009 by Tout est possible, and as of 2011 she was working on two more, Les hommes de l’histoire and Aouran dollé. As a performer, she traveled widely throughout West Africa.

Her songs cover traditional themes such as love and religious affairs, as well as political subjects such as public health. Garba remained politically active through much of her career, and was an outspoken supporter of the Nigerien Democratic Movement for an African Federation and its leader, Hama Amadou. She was jailed in Niamey in 2016, accused by the authorities of inciting civil disobedience for writing and performing a song describing Amadou as "Niger's Mandela" and calling for the presidency of Mahamadou Issoufou to end like that of Goodluck Jonathan.

Garba's work was discussed in the book Engaging Modernity: Muslim Women and the Politics of Agency in Postcolonial Niger by Ousseina Alidou. Garba died on 5 December 2022, at age 63.
