= Social Democratic Rally =

Political party in Niger

Social Democratic Rally Rassemblement social démocratique
- Leader: Amadou Cheiffou
- Founded: 15 January 2004
- Dissolved: 27 July 2023 (work suspensed); 26 March 2025
- Ideology: Social democracy

The Social Democratic Rally (French: Rassemblement social démocratique, RSD-Gaskiya) was a political party in Niger. Its president was Amadou Cheiffou and its first secretary-general is Mahamadou Ali Tchémogo.

== History ==
The RSD-Gaskiya was founded by Cheiffou in January 2004 as a split from the Democratic and Social Convention (CDS), and fared well in the July 2004 municipal elections. In the 2004 general elections Cheiffou was nominated as the RSD candidate, receiving 6.35% of the vote and placing fourth out of six candidates; the party subsequently backed incumbent President Mamadou Tandja in the second round, which he won with 66% of the vote. In the parliamentary elections, the RSD-Gaskiya received 7.1% of the vote, winning seven of the 113 seats in the National Assembly.

In May 2009, the party was one of a handful of parties that supported President Tandja's call for a referendum to create a new constitution that would remove term limits on the presidency. After the referendum, the party placed second in the October 2009 parliamentary election amidst an opposition boycott; receiving 16% of the vote, it won 15 seats. Cheiffou was the RSD presidential candidate again for the 2011 general elections; he finished fifth in a field of ten candidates with 4% of the vote. In the parliamentary elections the party lost all 15 seats as its vote share fell to 1.8%.

The 2016 general elections saw Cheiffou run for the presidency again, finishing eighth out of fifteen candidates with 1.8% of the vote. However, the party regained parliamentary representation, winning four seats in the National Assembly.
