= Habi Mahamadou Salissou =

Habi Mahamadou Salissou is a Nigerien politician and a former Secretary-General of the centre-right National Movement for the Development of Society (MNSD). He served in the government of Niger as Minister of Secondary and Higher Education from 2001 to 2004 and as Minister of Trade and Industry from 2004 to 2007.

Considered a strong ally of Prime Minister Hama Amadou, Salissou supported Amadou following his 2007 split with President Tandja Mamadou over control of the party. Amadou, deposed in a vote of no-confidence in June 2007 and later arrested for corruption, remained as President of the MNSD, with Salissou as Secretary-General strongly supporting Amadou. Both were removed from their posts in early 2009.

== Third Republic ==
Salissou was elected to the National Assembly in the February 1993 parliamentary election as an MNSD candidate in Tahoua constituency.

== Fifth Republic ==
The MSND opposed the January 1996 coup which led to creation of the Fourth Republic. Salissou was among those arrested following an opposition protest on 11 January 1997.

In the November 1999 parliamentary election, Salissou was again elected to the National Assembly from Tahoua constituency; he served as a Deputy until September 2001. He was also First Questeur of the National Assembly and First Rapporteur of the MNSD Parliamentary Group during that period.

In the government named on September 17, 2001, under Prime Minister Hama Amadou of the MNSD, Salissou was appointed as Minister of Secondary and Higher Education, Research and Technology. Following the December 2004 parliamentary election, he was appointed Minister of Trade, Industry and the Promotion of the Private Sector in the government named on December 30, 2004.

As Minister of Trade and Industry, Salissou was also designated to chair a national steering committee responsible for talks on an economic partnership agreement (EPA) between West African countries and the European Union; the creation of this committee was announced on May 24, 2007.

In addition to being the Secretary-General of the MNSD, Salissou was also President of the MNSD section in Tahoua Region.

Considered close to Amadou, Salissou was not included in the government of Prime Minister Seyni Oumarou (also of the MNSD), named on June 9, 2007 following a no-confidence vote against the previous government.

=== Party split ===
After Amadou was removed from office as Prime Minister, the MNSD experienced division between his supporters (including Salissou) and supporters of President Tandja Mamadou. Amadou was jailed for corruption, pending a trial, on 26 June 2008, and he designated Salissou to act as Interim President of the MNSD in his absence. The MNSD Political Commission met on 7 September 2008 and voted to remove Salissou from his post as Interim President, replacing him with Hamidou Sékou; 10 out of 13 members of the Political Commission supported this decision. This was, however, followed by more controversy.

While there was ongoing support for Amadou from sections of the MNSD, especially from his political base in Tillabery, Amadou was finally stripped of the formal leadership of the MNSD in early 2009. A special congress of the MNSD-Nassara held in Zinder on 21 February 2009 elected Oumarou as the party's President; on the same occasion, Interior Minister Albadé Abouba was elected as Secretary-General to replace Salissou. This result came after months of wrangling between pro-Tandja and pro-Amadou elements in the party that threatened to split the MNSD and saw pro-Amadou groups join opposition protests against a floated plan to extend Tandja's term past the 2009 elections.
