= Moumouni Adamou Djermakoye =

Nigerien politician

Moumouni Adamou Djermakoye (May 22, 1939 – June 14, 2009) was a Nigerien politician and the President of the Nigerien Alliance for Democracy and Progress (ANDP-Zaman Lahiya). He was an important minister during the regime of Seyni Kountché and subsequently served as Niger's Ambassador to the United States from 1988 to 1991; later, after founding the ANDP, he served as President of the National Assembly of Niger from 1993 to 1994. He was the ANDP's candidate in four presidential elections, beginning in 1993; he was also a deputy in the National Assembly from 1999 to 2009 and the President of the High Court of Justice from 2005 to 2009.

== Background ==
His family names, Moumouni Djermakoye, marked him as a descendant—but not heir—of the most powerful ruling dynasty of Djerma society, that of the Djermakoy of Dosso: the first amongst equals of Djerma rulers and a house especially favoured during the colonial period.

Djermakoye entered the military as a young officer, and took part in Seyni Kountché's April 1974 coup which overthrew President Hamani Diori. He became a key member of the ruling council, and developed a personal power base in Dosso.

== Service as a minister and diplomat during military rule (1974–1991) ==
Following the 1974 coup, Djermakoye served as Minister of Foreign Affairs and Cooperation from April 22, 1974, to September 10, 1979. On the latter date, he was named Minister of Youth, Sports, and Culture, in which position he served until he was named Minister of Public Health and Social Affairs on August 31, 1981. He remained in the latter position until January 24, 1983. In May 1988 he was named Ambassador to the United States and Permanent Representative to the United Nations. He presented his credentials as Ambassador to the United States on September 19, 1988, serving in that post until mid-1991.

== MNSD leadership bid, formation of the ANDP, multiparty elections (1991–1996) ==
In 1991, Djermakoye was defeated by Tandja Mamadou in a bid to become leader of the National Movement for the Development of Society (MNSD). This struggle was marked by a question of ethnicity: Djermakoye, who was a member of the dominant ethnic group in the party (the Djerma), lost to Tandja, who was not. After his defeat, he formed a group called the Club of Moumouni Adamou Djermokoye's Friends (CAMAD), which later became the ANDP.

In February 1993, Djermakoye stood as the ANDP candidate in the first round of the 1993 presidential election and placed fourth with 15.24% of the vote. As part of a coalition called the Alliance of the Forces of Change, Djermakoye backed Mahamane Ousmane of the Democratic and Social Convention (CDS) in the second round of the election against Tandja of the MNSD, and Ousmane was victorious. In the February 1993 parliamentary election, the ANDP won 11 out of 83 seats in the National Assembly, performing well among the Zarma; Djermakoye himself was elected to the National Assembly as an ANDP candidate in Dosso constituency.

On April 13, 1993, Djermakoye was elected as President of the National Assembly. The MNSD opposed the vote in which Djermakoye was elected, calling it unconstitutional and refusing to participate in it. Following an appeal by the opposition, the Supreme Court annulled Djermakoye's election as President of the National Assembly on April 23, but the National Assembly elected Djermakoye again in May 1993. He remained President of the National Assembly until October 1994, when the National Assembly was dissolved ahead of a new parliamentary election.

== Under the Maïnassara regime and transitional military rule (1996–1999) ==
After the military, led by Ibrahim Baré Maïnassara, seized power in January 1996, a new presidential election was held in July 1996, in which Djermakoye took fifth place with 4.77% of the vote. On the second day of the election, which was won by Maïnassara, Djermakoye was placed under house arrest along with the three other opposition candidates, and he remained under house arrest for two weeks. After Maïnassara's victory, Djermakoye and the ANDP recognized it and supported him, but on April 28, 1998 he announced that the ANDP was breaking with Maïnassara's Rally for Democracy and Progress, alleging that Maïnassara had "humiliated and marginalised" the ANDP.

Following another coup in April 1999, Djermakoye was made President of the National Consultative Council during the transitional period prior to new elections. In August 1999, he was chosen by the ANDP to run again as its candidate in the October 1999 presidential election. In the election, Djermakoye received fifth place with 7.73% of the vote. On November 4, he announced his support for Mahamadou Issoufou, the candidate of the Nigerien Party for Democracy and Socialism, in the second round of voting. Issoufou lost the second round to Tandja. Djermakoye was elected to the National Assembly in the November 1999 parliamentary election from Dosso constituency; he was one of four ANDP candidates to win seats in the election.

== Activities during the Fifth Republic (1999–2009) ==
In July 2002, the ANDP joined the MNSD-led Alliance of Democratic Forces, the ruling coalition, withdrawing from the opposition Coordination of Democratic Forces to which it had previously belonged. On November 8, 2002, Djermakoye was named Minister of State for African Integration and New Partnership for Africa's Development Programs; he served in this position until resigning from the government in November 2004 due to his participation in the elections that were about to be held. On September 19, 2004, he was again chosen as the ANDP presidential candidate; he said on this occasion that he did not intend to run again in the 2009 presidential election. In the November 2004 presidential election, he again took fifth place with 6.07% of the vote. Shortly before the first round of the election, Djermakoye said that he would support Tandja in the second round. In the December 2004 parliamentary election, Djermakoye was re-elected to the National Assembly from Dosso constituency.

On May 24, 2005, Djermakoye was elected as President of the High Court of Justice, a special judicial body composed of National Assembly deputies. Djermakoye was defeated by Mahamane Ousmane in an election for the position of Speaker of the Economic Community of West African States (ECOWAS) Parliament on November 14, 2006, taking 37 votes against 58 for Ousmane.

Reacting to President Tandja's controversial efforts to call a referendum on a new constitution that would allow him to run for re-election—efforts that were opposed by both opposition parties and members of the presidential majority coalition—Djermakoye expressed disapproval, saying that the nation could be "split in two" by Tandja's referendum plans. After the Constitutional Court ruled against Tandja on May 25, 2009, Tandja promptly dissolved the National Assembly on May 26. Observers noted that in doing so he averted the possibility of being placed on trial for treason at the High Court of Justice, with Djermakoye presiding.

Djermakoye was taken ill, reportedly from the heat, at a June 14, 2009, rally in Niamey, protesting President Tandja's referendum proposal; he collapsed shortly before he was expected to address the protesters. Djermakoye, who was reported to have previously suffered from a heart condition, died at a Niamey hospital thirty minutes later. An official ceremony and military tribute for Djermakoye was held in Niamey on June 15, with President Tandja in attendance. His funeral was also held in Dosso on the same day, amidst a large crowd of mourners.
