= Vice President of Niger =

Deputy head of state of Niger

- Vice-président du Niger
- Emblem of Niger

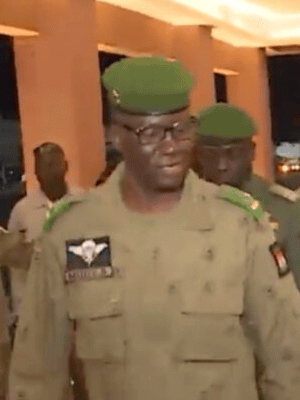
- Incumbent; Salifou Modi since July 2023

The vice president of Niger (French: Vice-président du Niger) is an ad hoc governmental position in Niger. There is no provision for a vice president in the Constitution of Niger and the position has only existed under military regimes. The country has had four vice presidents to-date, including the incumbent Salifou Modi, who, like the previous three, has been appointed by the military regime.

== Vice Presidents ==
Name (Birth–Death)	Took office	Left office	Notes
Sani Souna Sido	1974	2 August 1975	Conseil Militaire Superieur (April 1974 – May 1989)
-	May 1989	December 1989	Supreme Council of National Orientation (May 1989 – December 1989)
Youssoufa Maïga	January 1996	December 1996	Conseil du Salut National (January 1996 – December 1996)
Soumana Zanguina	April 1999	December 1999	Conseil de Réconciliation Nationale (April 1999 – December 1999)
-	February 2010	January 2011	Supreme Council for the Restoration of Democracy (February 2010 – January 2011)
Salifou Modi	July 2023	Incumbent	National Council for the Safeguard of the Homeland (since July 2023)

== See also ==
- Politics of Niger
- List of heads of state of Niger
- List of prime ministers of Niger
