= Alliance of the Forces of Change =

Alliance of the Forces of Change Alliance des forces du changement
- Founded: 1991
- Dissolved: 1996
- Merger of: CDS-Rahama; PNDS-Tarayya (until 1994); ANDP-Zaman Lahiya; PPN-RDA (until 1994); UDPS-Amana; PSDN-Alheri; UPDP-Chamoua; UDFP-Sawaba; PRLPN-Nakowa
- Political position: Catch-all

The Alliance of the Forces of Change (in French: Alliance des forces du changement, AFC) was one of the two large political coalitions which contested for power in Niger from 1991 to 1996.

== Formation ==
The AFC was formed following the end of military rule in the 1991-1993 transition period. It consisted of nine parties, although one left the coalition in 1994. The AFC based its broad stance on opposition to the National Movement for a Developing Society-Nassara (MNSD-Nassara), the political coalition set up by former ruler General Ali Saibou, as well as a perception among some of the traditional elites of Nigerien Hausaland, that previous regimes had favoured the Djerma--Songhai since independence. As well, one traditional Djerma leader, Moumouni Adamou Djermakoye, lost out of a role in the leadership of the MNSD, and brought his Nigerien Alliance for Democracy and Progress (ANDP-Zaman Lahiya) into the AFC.

== Bases of support ==
The largest powers in the AFC were the Democratic and Social Convention-Rahama (CDS-Rahama), led by Mahamane Ousmane, and the Nigerien Party for Democracy and Socialism-Tarayya (PNDS-Tarayya), led by Mahamadou Issoufou. Both these men were of Hausa background, and both parties relied upon Hausaland as one, though far from all, of their bases of support.

== In power 1993-1994 ==
In the February 1993 elections, the AFC took 50 of 83 seats in the new National Assembly, making it the first ruling party of the Third Republic, and the first democratically elected government of Niger since independence. Mahamane Ousmane, became President and Mahamadou Issoufou became Prime Minister.

== Fracturing 1994-1995 ==
But the AFC's fragile coalition, in no small measure based on simple desire to keep the MNSD out, soon teetered. In 1994, Prime Minister Issoufou and his PNDS broke from the coalition. In a 21 September 1994 decree, Ousmane had strengthened his powers at the expense of those of the prime minister, and Issoufou resigned on 28 September rather than accept this. The PNDS was unwilling to put forward another candidate to take Issoufou's place and withdrew from the AFC, thereby depriving the AFC of its parliamentary majority. The PNDS then formed an alliance with the opposition MNSD despite its history of hostility toward that party; Adji Kirgam and Mazou Ibrahim, two PNDS leaders who opposed this alliance, were expelled from the party. In the process the small PPN-RDA crossed over to the opposition as well. In the February 1995 elections which Ousmane called to form a new house, the MNSD took parliament and the Prime Minister's post, with the AFC winning only 40 of the 83 seats, and leading to a period of rancorous cohabitation with President Mahamane Ousmane.

== End of the Third Republic 1996 ==
This period of government infighting led, in part, to the January 1996 military coup by Ibrahim Baré Maïnassara, new presidential elections in July 1996, and the military's arrest of major opposition candidates to Maïnassara. A side effect of this was the dissolution of the AFC as a political block.

== Parties of the AFC 1991-1996 ==
- Democratic and Social Convention-Rahama (CDS-Rahama)
- Nigerien Party for Democracy and Socialism-Tarayya (PNDS-Tarayya) 1991-1994
- Nigerien Alliance for Democracy and Progress-Zaman Lahiya (ANDP-Zaman Lahiya)
- Niger Progressive Party-African Democratic Rally (PPN-RDA) 1991-1994
- Union for Democracy and Social Progress-Amana (UDPS-Amana)
- Party for Socialism and Democracy in Niger (PSDN-Alheri)
- Union for Democratic Patriots and Progressives-Chamoua (UPDP-Chamoua)
- Union of Popular Forces for Democracy and Progress-Sawaba (UDFP-Sawaba)
- Republican Party for Liberty and Progress-Nakowa (PRLPN-Nakowa)
