= Nigerien Democratic Movement for an African Federation =

Political party in Niger

Nigerien Democratic Movement for an African Federation Mouvement démocratique nigérien pour une fédération africain
- Leader: Hama Amadou
- Founded: 12 May 2009
- Dissolved: 27 July 2023 (work suspensed); 26 March 2025
- Headquarters: Niamey
- Newspaper: LUMANA
- Ideology: Islamic democracy Pan-Africanism
- Religion: Sunni Islam

The Nigerien Democratic Movement for an African Federation (French: Mouvement démocratique nigérien pour une fédération africain, MODEN/FA-Lumana) was a political party in Niger, led by Hama Amadou.

== History ==
The party was established on 12 May 2009. It did not run in the 2009 parliamentary elections, but contested the 2011 general elections, putting forward Amadou as its presidential candidate; he finished third with 20% of the vote. In the parliamentary elections, the party won 23 of the 113 seats in the National Assembly.

Amadou ran for the presidency again in the 2016 general elections. He finished second in the first round of voting, receiving 18% of the vote, qualifying for the second round. However, the party boycotted the second round, resulting in Mahamadou Issoufou winning with 92% of the vote. The elections also saw the party win 25 seats in the National Assembly, which was expanded to 171 seats.

Singer Hamsou Garba was a notable supporter of the party, which led to her imprisonment, briefly, in Niamey in 2016.

== Electoral results ==
=== President of Niger ===
Election	Candidate	Votes	%	Votes	%	Result
Election	Candidate	First round		Second round		Result
2011	Hama Amadou	653,737	19.8 (#3)	-	-	Lost ✗
2016	Hama Amadou	824,500	17.3 (#2)	332,292	7.5 (#2)	Lost ✗
2020–21	Did not take part					

=== National Assembly ===
Election	Leader	Votes	%	Seats	+/–	Position
2011	Hama Amadou	637,108	19.7 (#3)	23 / 113	New	3rd
2016	Hama Amadou	615,393	12.9 (#2)	25 / 171	▲2	▲2nd
2020	Hama Amadou	410,311	8.7 (#2)	19 / 171	▼6	2nd
