= Union of Independent Nigeriens =

Political party in Niger

The Union of Independent Nigeriens (French: Union des Nigériens indépendants, UNI) is a political party in Niger.

== History ==
The UNI was established on 17 May 1999. In the October 1999 general elections it nominated Amadou Ali Djibo as its presidential candidate; he finished last in a field of seven candidates with 2% of the vote. The party also failed to win a seat in the National Assembly, after receiving 1.25% of the vote.

The party contested the 2004 general elections in alliance with the Nigerien Party for Democracy and Socialism and Union for Democracy and the Republic. It did not nominate a presidential candidate, but a joint list of the three parties won two seats in the National Assembly.

It contested the 2009 parliamentary elections alone, winning one seat. The party did not nominate a presidential candidate in the 2011 general elections, but retained its seat in the National Assembly. However, it lost its parliamentary elections in the 2016 general elections.
