= Aliou Mahamidou =

Former Nigerien Prime Minister

Aliou Mahamidou (7 June 1947 – 13 January 1996) was a Nigerien businessman and politician who served as the Prime Minister of Niger from 2 March 1990 to 1 November 1991.

Political offices
Preceded by Mamane Oumarou	Prime Minister of Niger; 1990–1991	Succeeded by Amadou Cheiffou
