= List of presidents of the National Assembly of Niger =

Below is a list of legislative speakers of the legislative arm of Niger.

== During the Colony of Niger ==
Territorial Council of Niger in Colony of Niger.

Name	Took office	Left office	Notes
Djermakoye Moumouni Aouta	January 1945	March 1948	
Fernand Balay	March 1948	November 1953	
Malick N'Diaye	4 December 1953	12 November 1954	
Georges Condat	April 1957	14 November 1958	

== During the First Republic and Second Republic ==
Name	Took office	Left office	Notes
Boubou Hama	18 December 1958	February 1959	President of the Constituent Assembly
Boubou Hama	February 1959	15 April 1974	President of the National Assembly
Moutari Moussa	18 December 1989	11 August 1991	President of the National Assembly

== President of the High Council of the Republic ==
Name	Took office	Left office	Notes
André Salifou	November 1991	April 1993	

== Presidents of the National Assembly of Niger ==
Name	Took office	Left office
Moumouni Adamou Djermakoye	13 April 1993	23 April 1993
Moumouni Adamou Djermakoye	May 1993	17 October 1994
Mahamadou Issoufou	February 1995	27 January 1996
Moutari Moussa	December 1996	9 April 1999
Mahamane Ousmane	29 December 1999	14 December 2004
Mahamane Ousmane	16 December 2004	May 2009
Seyni Oumarou	25 November 2009	18 February 2010

== President of the National Consultative Council ==
Name	Took office	Left office
Marou Amadou	7 April 2010	7 April 2011

== Presidents of the National Assembly of Niger ==
Name	Took office	Left office
Hama Amadou	19 April 2011	24 November 2014
Amadou Salifou	24 November 2014	24 March 2016
Ousseini Tinni	25 March 2016	23 March 2021
Seyni Oumarou	23 March 2021	27 July 2023.

== Speaker of the Transitional Advisory Council ==
Name	Took office	Left office	Notes
Mamoudou Harouna Djingarey	8 May 2025	Incumbent	During military rule
