= Boukary Adji =

Prime Minister of Niger

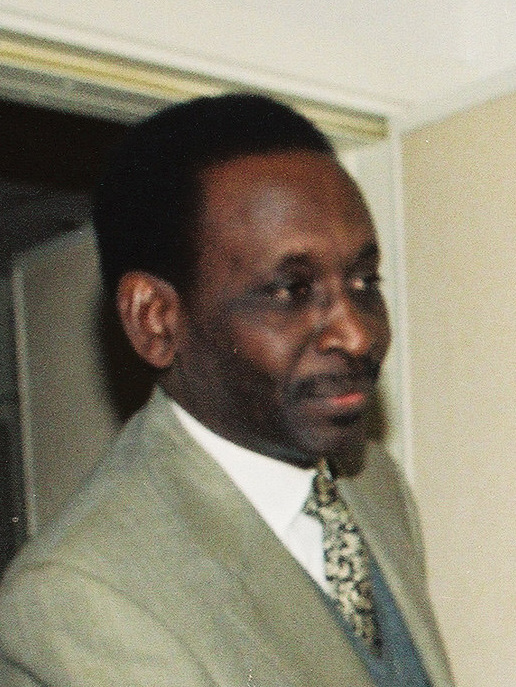
- Adji in 1996

Prime Minister of Niger
- In office 30 January 1996 – 21 December 1996
- President: Ibrahim Baré Maïnassara
- Preceded by: Hama Amadou
- Succeeded by: Amadou Cissé

Personal details
- Born: 1939 Tanout, Zinder Region, Niger
- Died: July 4, 2018 Niamey, Niger
- Education: University of Abidjan; Center for Financial and Banking Studies, Paris; University in Poland (scholarship, 1963)
- Profession: Economist, Politician

Boukary Adji (1939– 4 July 2018) was a Nigerien politician. He served as Niger's Prime Minister from 30 January 1996 to 21 December 1996.

Adji was born in Tanout in Zinder Department. He studied in Poland on a scholarship he received in 1963, then at the University of Abidjan and at the Center for Financial and Banking Studies in Paris. He was appointed as Director in the Ministry of Planning in the early 1970s and became the Director of the Central Bank of West African States (BCEAO) for Niger. In the government named on 14 November 1983, he was appointed Minister of Finance, in which position he remained until after the 1987 death of Seyni Kountché. Later he served as Vice-Governor of the BCEAO.

He was named Prime Minister after Ibrahim Baré Maïnassara seized power in a January 1996 military coup.

He died in the Niger capital Niamey on 4 July 2018.

Political offices
Preceded by Hama Amadou	Prime Minister of Niger; 1996	Succeeded by Amadou Cissé
