= Party for Socialism and Democracy in Niger =

Political party in Niger

Party for Socialism and Democracy in Niger Parti pour le socialisme et la démocratie au Niger
- Leader: Issaka Labo
- Founded: 18 May 1992
- Dissolved: 27 July 2023 (work suspensed); 26 March 2025
- Ideology: Social democracy Democratic socialism
- Political position: Centre-left
- National Assembly: 3 / 171

The Party for Socialism and Democracy in Niger (French: Parti pour le socialisme et la démocratie au Niger, PSDN-Alheri) was a political party in Niger.

== History ==
The PSDN was established on 18 May 1992. In the 1993 general elections the party received 1.5% of the vote, winning one seat in the National Assembly. It nominated Omar Katzelma Taya as its candidate for the subsequent presidential elections; he finished seventh in a field of eight candidates with 1.8% of the vote.

The early parliamentary elections in 1995 saw the party win two seats with a similar vote share. However, it boycotted the 1996 elections, which followed a coup earlier in the year.

The PSDN did not nominate a presidential candidate for the 1999 elections, and received only 0.2% of the vote in the parliamentary elections, failing to win a seat. However, after increasing its vote share to 1.3% in the 2004 general elections, it regained parliamentary representation, winning a single seat. Despite further increasing its vote share to 2.3% in the 2009 parliamentary elections, the party lost its seat. The 2011 elections saw its vote share collapse to 0.2%, as it remained seatless.

In the 2016 general elections the PSDN formed a joint list with the Nigerien Movement for Democratic Renewal to run for the National Assembly, with the alliance winning six seats.
