= Nigerien Alliance for Democracy and Progress =

Political party in Niger

Nigerien Alliance for Democracy and Progress Alliance nigérienne pour la démocratie et le progrès
- Leader: Moussa Hassane Barazé
- Founded: 27 February 1992
- Banned: 27 July 2023 (Activities suspended); 26 March 2025
- Ideology: Progressivism

The Nigerien Alliance for Democracy and Progress (French: Alliance nigérienne pour la démocratie et le progrès, ANDP-Zaman Lahiya) was a political party in Niger. Moumouni Adamou Djermakoye led the party from its foundation in 1992 until his death in 2009.

== History ==
=== 20th century ===
Djermakoye was the leader of one of two major factions that emerged in the National Movement for the Development of Society (MNSD) in 1991. He was a member of the Zarma (Djerma) ethnic group, which had previously dominated the party, but rival faction leader Mamadou Tandja was elected as President of the MNSD in November 1991 with the support of non-Zarma elements in the party. Djermakoye then split from the MNSD and formed the Club of the Friends of Moumouni Adamou Djermakoye (CAMAD), which subsequently became the Nigerien Alliance for Democracy and Progress (ANDP).

Djermakoye was the ANDP's candidate in the 1993 presidential elections; after he finished in fourth place with 15.24% of the vote in the first round, the ANDP, as part of a coalition called the Alliance of the Forces of Change (AFC), backed second-placed candidate Mahamane Ousmane of the Democratic and Social Convention in the run-off vote, and Ousmane prevailed against the MNSD's Tandja. The ANDP formed part of the AFC parliamentary majority after the 1993 parliamentary elections, in which the ANDP won 11 seats, with Djermakoye becoming President of the National Assembly. The ANDP's split from the MNSD was seen as crucial in enabling the opposition's victory.

The AFC majority, including the ANDP, lasted until the Nigerien Party for Democracy and Socialism (PNDS) split from the AFC in September 1994, leading to a new parliamentary election in January 1995 in which the AFC was beaten by an opposition coalition primarily composed of the MNSD and the PNDS. The ANDP won nine seats and remained with the AFC in opposition.

Following a January 1996 military coup, Djermakoye again ran unsuccessfully for president as the ANDP candidate in the July 1996 elections, finishing in fifth place with 4.77% of the vote. After Maïnassara's victory, the ANDP recognized it and supported him. In the November 1996 parliamentary elections, which was boycotted by the opposition, the ANDP won eight seats, becoming the second-largest party in the National Assembly. In early 1998 the ANDP joined a pro-Maïnassara alliance of three parties, the Alliance of Democratic and Social Forces. On April 28, 1998, Djermakoye announced that the ANDP was splitting with Maïnassara, alleging that the latter had "humiliated and marginalised" the party.

Following another coup in April 1999, in which Maïnassara was killed, Djermakoye was the party's presidential candidate in the October general elections, finishing in fifth place with 7.73% of the vote, while the ANDP won four seats in the parliamentary elections. Djermakoye backed PNDS candidate Mahamadou Issoufou in the second round of the presidential elections, although Issoufou was defeated by MNSD candidate Tandja. Following the elections, the ANDP went into opposition and joined the same parliamentary group as the Rally for Democracy and Progress (RDP-Jama'a).

=== 21st century ===
In July 2002, the ANDP joined the parliamentary majority coalition, the Alliance of Democratic Forces, leaving the opposition Coordination of Democratic Forces. Djermakoye joined the government as a Minister of State in November 2002, serving in that position until December 2004.

On September 19, 2004, at the ANDP's third extraordinary congress, Djermakoye was again chosen by the party as its presidential candidate for the upcoming general elections, saying that he did not intend to run again in the 2009 presidential election. In the presidential elections, he received 6% of the vote, taking fifth place. Like the three other parties whose candidates were eliminated in the first round, the ANDP backed Tandja in the second round. In the parliamentary elections the party received 5.44% of the popular vote, winning five of the 113 seats.

Djermakoye died in June 2009. The party was part of the Coordination of Forces for Democracy and the Republic alliance that boycotted the 2009 parliamentary elections.

Djermakoye's brother Moussa Moumouni Djermakoye, having retired from the military, was elected as ANDP President at an extraordinary party congress on 20 June 2010. He won the vote easily; he received 278 votes, while Amadou Nouhou received 85 votes and Ali Seyni Gado received 66 votes. With President Tandja ousted in the 2010 coup, the ANDP participated in the 2011 general elections. Moussa Moumouni Djermakoye stood as the party's presidential candidate, receiving 4% of the vote and finishing sixth in a field of ten candidates, whilst the party won eight seats in the National Assembly.

At the ANDP's Sixth Ordinary Congress, held in Maradi on 9–10 May 2015, Djermakoye was re-elected as president of the ANDP, with Dan Dijé as first vice-president, Mahamadou Adamou as second vice-president, and Saley Saidou as secretary-general.

The party did not nominate a candidate for the February 2016 presidential election, choosing to endorse the candidacy of incumbent President Mahamadou Issoufou in the first round of voting. In the concurrent parliamentary election, it was reduced to four seats in the National Assembly.
