= Hama Amadou =

Prime Minister of Niger (1995–1996, 2000–2007)

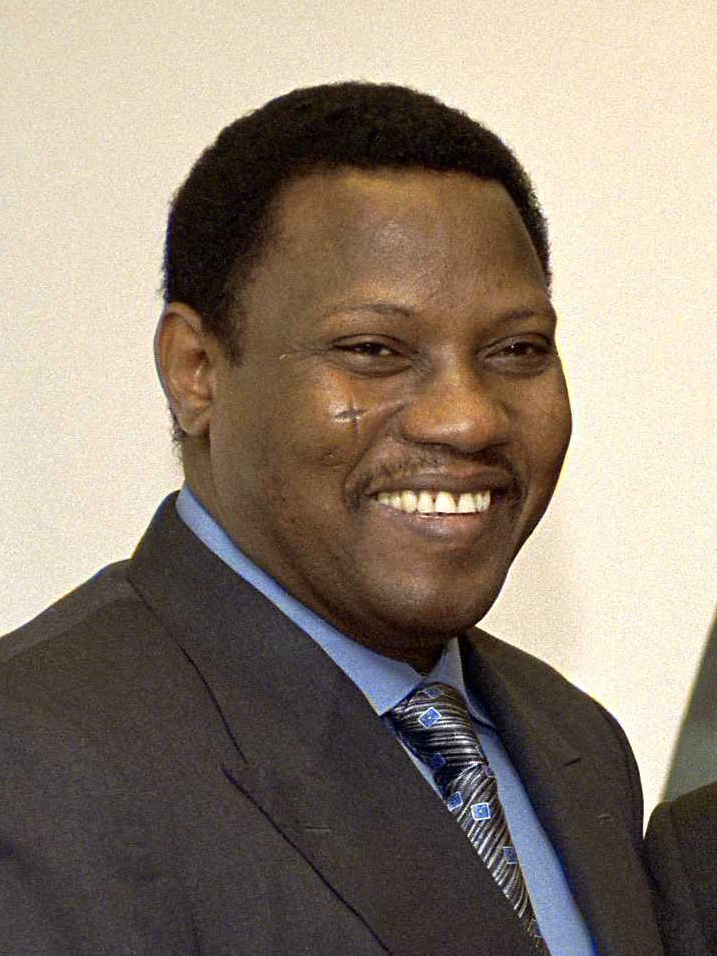
- Amadou in 2001

Prime Minister of Niger
- In office 1 January 2000 – 7 June 2007
- President: Mamadou Tandja
- Preceded by: Ibrahim Hassane Mayaki
- Succeeded by: Seyni Oumarou
- In office 21 February 1995 – 27 January 1996
- President: Mahamane Ousmane
- Preceded by: Amadou Cissé
- Succeeded by: Boukary Adji

President of the National Assembly
- In office 19 April 2011 – 24 November 2014
- Preceded by: Seyni Oumarou
- Succeeded by: Amadou Salifou

Minister of Information
- In office 15 July 1988 – 20 December 1989
- President: Ali Saibou
- Prime Minister: Mamane Oumarou

Personal details
- Born: 3 March 1950 Youri, Colony of Niger, French West Africa
- Died: 23 October 2024 (aged 74) Niamey, Niger
- Party: MNSD-Nassara (1989–2010); MODEN/FA-Lumana (2010–present)

Hama Amadou (3 March 1950 – 23 October 2024) was a Nigerien politician who was Prime Minister of Niger from 1995 to 1996 and again from 2000 to 2007. He was also Secretary-General of the National Movement for the Development of Society (MNSD-Nassara) from 1991 to 2001 and President of the MNSD-Nassara from 2001 to 2009. Amadou was from the Kurtey, a Fula sub-group, and was raised in the Tillaberi Region, in the Niger River valley, north of Niamey.

Following corruption allegations against his government, he was removed from office as Prime Minister through a 2007 no-confidence vote in the National Assembly of Niger. In 2008, he became the target of a corruption investigation which saw him arrested to face criminal charges at the Nigerien High Court of Justice and removed from his post as MNSD President.

From 2011 to 2014, Amadou was President of the National Assembly of Niger. He was elected to that post as an ally of President Mahamadou Issoufou, but in 2013 he went into opposition. He fled Niger in August 2014 to escape arrest on charges related to a baby-trafficking investigation. Upon those charges, Amadou was sentenced to one year in prison, in March 2017, by the Niamey Court of Appeals. Amadou was tried in absentia, since he was exiled in France.

== Early life ==
Hama Amadou was born on 3 March 1950, in Youri.

== Under Kountché and Saibou ==
During the regime of Seyni Kountché, Amadou was Director-General of the Office of Radio Broadcasting and Television of Niger (ORTN) from 1983 to 1985 and became Director of the Cabinet in 1985. Following Kountché's death, Amadou was named Minister of Information under his successor, Ali Saibou, on 15 July 1988, serving until 20 December 1989.

== Third Republic ==
At an MNSD congress held in November 1991, Amadou was elected as its Secretary-General, while Tandja Mamadou was elected as the President of the MNSD.

Amadou was elected to the National Assembly in the February 1993 parliamentary election as an MNSD candidate in Niamey.

In another election held in January 1995, an opposition alliance, primarily composed of the MNSD and the Nigerien Party for Democracy and Socialism (PNDS), won a majority of seats, resulting in cohabitation between the government, led by Amadou, and President Mahamane Ousmane. Initially, the parliamentary majority put forward Amadou as its sole candidate for the position of prime minister, rather than submit three candidates from which Ousmane would choose the prime minister. Ousmane rejected this and appointed Amadou Cissé, also an MNSD member, as prime minister, but the parliamentary majority would not accept Cissé. Ousmane backed down and appointed Amadou as prime minister after two weeks, on 21 February 1995. Amadou and Ousmane came into sharp conflict with one another, and the political system became paralyzed by the dispute. Beginning in April 1995, Ousmane refused to attend meetings of the Council of Ministers; Amadou replaced parastatal managers in July despite Ousmane's objections, and Amadou attempted to assume the presidential role with regard to the Council of Ministers.

== Under Maïnassara ==
On 27 January 1996, a military coup led by Ibrahim Baré Maïnassara ousted both Amadou and Ousmane, and they were both placed under house arrest for several months.

On 2 January 1998, Amadou was arrested for allegedly leading a plot to assassinate Maïnassara. He was released on bail on 8 January, but was charged with forming an illegal militia. Amadou denied the charge and said that the arrest was political harassment and a means to distract the people.

== Fourth Republic ==
Maïnassara was assassinated in an April 1999 coup, and new elections were held in late 1999. The MNSD's presidential candidate, Tandja Mamadou, won the presidential election. In the parliamentary election, held in November, the MNSD again won the largest number of seats, and through an alliance with Ousmane's party, the Democratic and Social Convention (CDS-Rahama), it held a majority in the new parliament.

Amadou was again elected to the National Assembly in the 1999 parliamentary election as an MNSD candidate from Niamey, but left his seat to become Prime Minister on 3 January 2000. On this occasion he told the deputies of the National Assembly that Niger faced a "disastrous" financial situation and that "the coffers are absolutely empty", asking them to temporarily go without their salaries as deputies.

As President of Niger, Tandja had to give up his position as President of the MNSD. Hamidou Sékou acted as interim president of the party until Amadou, who was until that point the party's Secretary-General, was elected as President of the MNSD on 21 December 2001.

While Amadou was campaigning for the July 2004 municipal elections, the helicopter in which he was travelling reportedly crashed on 14 July 2004 at Magaria in eastern Niger. Amadou survived the crash. He refused to rely on UN food aid in 2005, stating that the harvest was enough and that such aid was an insult to Niger's dignity.

=== 2007 no-confidence vote ===
Amadou's government lost a no-confidence vote on 31 May 2007, with 62 deputies out of 113 deputies in favor of the motion. The vote was prompted by allegations of corruption regarding embezzled funds that had been intended for education. Although supported by the MNSD deputies, two other groups, including the CDS, joined the opposition Nigerien Party for Democracy and Socialism (PNDS) to form a majority against the government. Amadou submitted his government's resignation immediately afterward; he called the vote an "expression of democracy" while also noting that the government had survived past no-confidence votes.

As a result of the no-confidence vote, President Tandja Mamadou had the choice of naming a new prime minister or calling new elections. He named Seyni Oumarou, one of three candidates selected by parliament, as prime minister on 3 June; Oumarou had previously been part of Amadou's government as Minister of State for Equipment.

== 2008 corruption charges ==
Amadou retained his post as President of MNSD-Nassara, but in 2008 faced another challenge. The Gendarmerie Nationale of Niger opened another investigation into the former prime minister, this time on charges he had embezzled 100 million CFA (Euros152,500) of foreign aid for independent press and communications development during the 2000 to 2006 period. Subsequent High Court investigations reduced the alleged amount by two-thirds. Mamadou Tandja called a special session of the National Assembly on 14 June 2008 to examine the case, as all sitting members of parliament hold immunity from prosecution. While the men had previously been close political allies, with Amadou seen as Tandja's chosen successor, their relationship had deteriorated during Amadou's years in office, and it was rumoured that the two had become rivals. Amadou publicly claimed that the charges were a "political plot" by portions of his own party. Amadou faced both a jail term and the loss of his right to hold political office in Niger if convicted.

A 14-member special panel examined the charges, and passed censure motions to the National Assembly; after over 24 hours of debate, the National Assembly voted 72 to 28 to strip Amadou of his immunity and passed the case on to the Nigerien High Court of Justice. On 26 June 2008, Amadou was arrested, and later transported to the civil prison at Koutoukaté, north of Niamey. His first appearance before the commission d'instruction of the High Court was pushed back from 29 July to 6 August 2008, at which time his request for release on bail was rejected by Bouba Mahamane, the procureur général of the High Court. In early August 2008 Zinder and Tillaberi sections of the MNSD proposed that Amadou be removed as party President. Amadou, his legal team, and his remaining supporters with the MNSD-Nassara charged the President and the government with inventing these charges to prevent Amadou from standing as a presidential candidate in the December 2009 election. They pointed to the removal of two of his political allies, Amadou Sala and Omar Hamidou Tchiana, from high political posts following Amadou's arrest.

Thousands of Amadou supporters protested his imprisonment at a rally in Niamey on 19 October 2008. Another pro-Amadou rally was planned for 26 October, but it was banned by the authorities.

=== Loss of MNSD leadership ===
Due to his imprisonment, Amadou designated Habi Mahamadou Salissou, the MNSD Secretary-General, as the party's Interim President. This decision was not accepted by Amadou's opponents in the party, who voted to instead install Hamidou Sékou as Interim President on 7 September 2008.

Despite ongoing support for Amadou from sections of the MNSD, especially from his political base in Tillabery, Amadou was stripped of the formal leadership of the ruling party in early 2009. A special congress of the MNSD-Nassara held in Zinder on 21 February 2009 elected Prime Minister Oumarou to succeed Amadou as MNSD President. Minister of the Interior Albadé Abouba was voted Secretary-General of the party, replacing Salissou. This result came after months of wrangling between pro-Tandja and pro-Amadou elements in the party that threatened to split the MNSD and saw pro-Amadou groups join opposition protests against a floated plan to extend Tandja's term beyond 2009.

=== Illness ===
Amadou was transferred from Koutoukalé prison to the National Hospital in Niamey in early March 2009, suffering from an unidentified illness, which the government stated was not life-threatening. Three weeks later, at the beginning of April, he was transferred back to prison, despite protests and a march by his supporters in Niamey, and legal action by his lawyers. Agence France-Presse reported that government medical experts brought to clear him for release back to prison had recommended he be transferred instead to a hospital in France, but were overruled. According to his wife, his poor health condition was related to low blood pressure and hypoglycaemia.

=== High Court trial and return to politics ===
Amadou's lawyers announced in April 2009 that the instruction and formation of the High Court of Justice was complete and they expected a trial to commence. The High Court is a provisional institution for the trial of political figures, overseen by the Supreme Court of Niger but formed from seven sitting deputies of the National Assembly of Niger. On 23 April 2009, the High Court of Justice ordered that Amadou be conditionally released for health reasons; in accordance with the High Court's decision, he was promptly released from prison after being detained for 10 months. Amadou complained that conditions in prison were poor and said that they should be improved.

Following his release, Amadou left Niger for medical treatment. Pointing to an inquiry that alleged Amadou held 15,000 shares in Ecobank, Nigerien authorities issued an international warrant for his arrest on 30 July 2009. Amadou spoke on Radio France Internationale on 31 July, deriding the corruption allegations as absurd: "Do you think someone is capable of stealing 16 billion CFA francs from the budget of Niger? If I had stolen 16 billion then why haven't the ministers who helped me steal it been named in the file?" He also said that Tandja simply wanted him imprisoned "for some reason or another".

Tandja was ousted in a February 2010 military coup, and a new junta initiated a transition to elections. Amadou returned from exile in France in March 2010 and created a new party, the Nigerien Democratic Movement (MDN). On 11 July 2010, he publicly announced his desire to stand as the MDN's candidate for the January 2011 presidential election and vowed to "fight as hard as I can to win power".

Placing third in the presidential election, Amadou then threw his support behind Mahamadou Issoufou, who had placed first. Issoufou prevailed in the second round. Amadou also won a seat in the 2011 parliamentary election, and he was elected as President of the National Assembly on 19 April 2011. The vote was nearly unanimous: there were 103 votes in favor and one vote against.

In 2013, Amadou joined the opposition to President Issoufou, although he remained in his post as President of the National Assembly. On 27 August 2014, the National Assembly's leadership, in response to a request from the government, decided to allow the arrest of Amadou, who was not present, in connection with an investigation into an illegal network trafficking infants from Nigeria. One of his wives had already been arrested. Within hours of the decision, Amadou fled to Burkina Faso. He had denounced the investigation, and his supporters argued that constitutionally he could only be arrested if his parliamentary immunity was removed through a vote of the National Assembly as a whole.

On 24 November 2014, the National Assembly elected Amadou Salifou to replace Hama Amadou as President of the National Assembly.

=== 2016 presidential election ===
Amadou returned to Niger on 14 November 2015, planning to stand as a candidate in the 2016 presidential election, but he was immediately arrested upon arrival at the airport in Niamey. Although he was still in jail, he was cleared to stand as a presidential candidate by the Constitutional Court in January 2016. An appeals court refused Amadou's request to be released on 11 January. Speaking through his lawyer, Amadou said afterward that he was a political prisoner and would not pursue any further appeal.

Provisional results released on 26 February 2016 showed President Issoufou with about 48% of the vote, falling just short of a first round majority. Hama Amadou, still in jail, placed second with 17.8% of the vote. With no candidate winning an outright majority, a second round was planned to be held on 20 March 2016. Although Amadou received a much smaller percentage of the first round vote, most of the other major opposition candidates were expected to support him in the second round.

Speaking on behalf of COPA 2016, the opposition coalition supporting Amadou, Seyni Oumarou (who placed third and backed Amadou for the second round), announced on 8 March that the coalition was boycotting the vote and withdrawing its representatives from the electoral commission. Nevertheless, Amadou's lawyer said on 11 March that he would still be a candidate.

Subsequent events were dominated by Amadou's health problems. After a medical crisis in which he was said to have briefly lost consciousness, he was moved from the prison in Filingue to Niamey; he was then taken to Paris for treatment on 16 March. COPA again called for a boycott on 18 March.

The second round was held on 20 March 2016 amidst an opposition boycott. Given the boycott, results announced on 22 March showed an unsurprisingly large victory for President Issoufou, who was credited with 92.5% of the vote. COPA denounced the election as fraudulent and rejected the results, saying that Niger would "have no legitimate president" after Issoufou's first term ended. The Niamey Court of Appeal issued an order for the "provisional release" of Amadou on 29 March 2016, although by that point he had already been out of the country for nearly two weeks.

A year later, on 13 March 2017, Hama Amadou was sentenced to one year in prison for his alleged involvement in the scheme to sell infants from Nigeria. Amadou remained in France and was not present.

=== 2020 presidential election ===
Amadou returned to Niger in 2019 and was imprisoned for eight months. He then contested the 2020–21 Nigerien general election but had his candidacy rejected. In February 2021, he was arrested for his role in unrest that followed Mohamed Bazoum's victory in the election, but was released in April and went to France. He returned for a final time to Niger following the 2023 Nigerien coup d'état and refrained from participating in political affairs.

== Death ==
Amadou died from malaria in Niamey, on 23 October 2024, at the age of 74. He was buried in his hometown of Youri on 25 October.

Political offices
Preceded by Amadou Cissé	Prime Minister of Niger; 1995–1996	Succeeded by Boukary Adji
Preceded by Ibrahim Hassane Mayaki	Prime Minister of Niger; 2000–2007	Succeeded by Seyni Oumarou
Preceded by Seyni Oumarou	President of the National Assembly; 2011–2014	Succeeded by Amadou Salifou
