= Youri, Niger =

Coordinates: 13°20′N 2°15′E

- Commune and village
- Interactive map of Youri, Niger
- Country: Niger
- Region: Tillabéri
- Department: Kollo

Area
  - Total: 229.5 sq mi (594.3 km^{2})

Population (2012 census)
  - Total: 31,598
  - Density: 137.7/sq mi (53.17/km^{2})
- Time zone: UTC+1 (WAT)

Youri, Niger is a village and rural commune in Niger. As of 2012, it had a population of 31,598.
