= 2011 Nigerien general election =

- Presidential election
- 31 January 2011 (first round); 12 March 2011 (second round)
- Turnout: 52.83% (first round); 48.17% (second round)
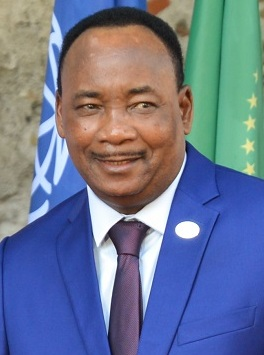

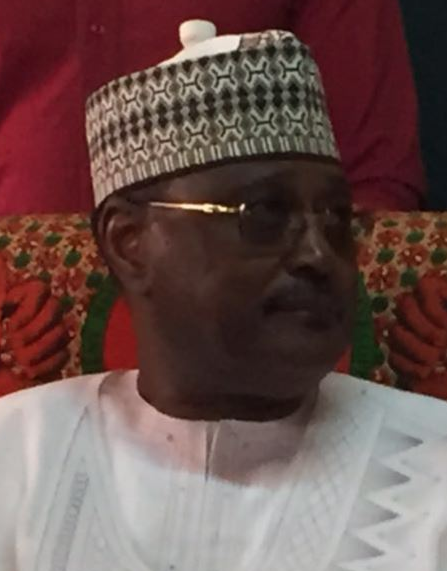
Nominee	Mahamadou Issoufou	Seyni Oumarou
Party	PNDS	MNSD
Popular vote	1,820,639	1,321,248
Percentage	57.95%	42.05%
President before election
Salou Djibo
Military
Elected President
Mahamadou Issoufou
PNDS
- Parliamentary election
- All 113 seats in the National Assembly; 57 seats needed for a majority
- Turnout: 49.22% (▼2.05pp)
Party	Vote %	Seats	+/–
PNDS	33.00	34	New
MNSD	20.57	25	−51
MODEN/FA	19.72	23	New
ANDP	7.51	8	New
RDP	6.49	7	0
UDR	5.44	6	New
CDS-Rahama	3.28	3	New
UNI	0.99	1	0
This lists parties that won seats. See the complete results below.
Results by constituency.
President of the National Consultative Council before	President of the National Assembly after
Marou Amadou; Independent	Hama Amadou; MODEN/FA

General elections were held in Niger on 31 January 2011 to elect the President and National Assembly, with a second round of the presidential elections on 12 March. The first round of the presidential elections was originally scheduled to be held on 3 January and the second round on 31 January, but was later postponed. The elections followed a military coup in February 2010 that ousted President Mamadou Tandja.

The presidential elections resulted in a victory for Mahamadou Issoufou of the Nigerien Party for Democracy and Socialism (PNDS), who defeated Seyni Oumarou of the National Movement for the Society of Development (MNDS). In the National Assembly elections, the PNDS emerged as the largest party.

== Background ==
Following President Tandja's attempts to extend his mandate beyond 2009, he was captured by soldiers who attacked his residence on 18 February 2010. Military leaders then created the Supreme Council for the Restoration of Democracy, and announced that the constitution was suspended and state institutions, such as the National Assembly, would be dissolved. A committee was created to study a new constitution.

In the first week of June, two-round elections were announced for January 2011 by the national election commission. Earlier the National Transitional Council had announced 26 December 2010 as the election date for the first round and 24 January 2011 for the second round and municipal elections. The results were scheduled to be announced on 4 March, with the winner taking office on 11 March.

In September 2010, the National Independent Electoral Commission (CENI) announced that the first round of both the presidential and parliamentary election would be delayed by several weeks to 31 January 2011. The delay meant a shift in subsequent dates as well: the second round date was changed to 12 March, and the swearing-in date for the newly elected president was changed to 6 April. CENI President Ghousmane Abdourahmane attributed the delay to "a problem of internal organisation and of financial means", but he vowed that there would be no further delay.

== Campaign ==
Seventeen parties that had previously united against Tandja as the Coordination of Democratic Forces for the Republic announced on 17 July 2010 that they had formed "a strategic alliance" for the presidential election. Under the terms of the alliance, the parties would run separate candidates in the first round of the election and then unite in the second round to support whichever of the alliance's candidates passed through to the second round. The alliance included Hama Amadou, Mahamane Ousmane, and Mahamadou Issoufou, some of Niger's most important politicians.

=== Presidential candidates ===
Hama Amadou, who was Prime Minister from 1995 to 1996 and again from 2000 to 2007, returned from exile in France in March 2010 and created a new party, the Nigerien Democratic Movement for an African Federation (MODEN/FA). On 11 July 2010, he publicly announced his desire to stand as the MODEN/FA candidate for the 2011 presidential election and vowed to "fight as hard as I can to win power".

The junta kept Tandja in detention following the coup, making it impossible for him to pursue any political activity; his ousted party, the MNSD, repeatedly demanded his release. The MNSD was expected to nominate its president, Seyni Oumarou—who was Prime Minister from 2007 to 2009 and President of the National Assembly from 2009 to 2010—as its presidential candidate. However, Oumarou was accused of embezzlement and arrested on 29 July 2010. The commission to Fight Financial Crime alleged that he owed the state 270 million CFA francs. The MNSD expressed outrage at the arrest of Oumarou and demanded his release; it said that the charge against him was a politically motivated effort to smear and marginalize the party. On 2 August 2010, Oumarou was charged and released on bail.

The MNSD announced on 10 August 2010 that Oumarou had been designated as its presidential candidate at a party congress.

The Nigerien Party for Democracy and Socialism (PNDS) designated Mahamadou Issoufou as the party's presidential candidate at a meeting in early November 2010. Issoufou said on the occasion that "the moment has come, the conditions are right", and he called on party members to "turn these conditions into votes at the ballot box". Some observers considered Issoufou—a major figure in Nigerien politics for many years—to be potentially the strongest candidate in the election.

The Constitutional Council of the Transition approved ten presidential candidates in December 2010, including all the key contenders: Mahamadou Issoufou, Mahamane Ousmane, Seyni Oumarou, Hama Amadou, Amadou Boubacar Cissé, Amadou Cheiffou, Moussa Moumouni Djermakoye, Ousmane Issoufou Oubandawaki, Mariama Gamatié Bayard and Abdoulaye Amadou Traoré. One candidate, Ibrahima Saidou Maiga, was rejected.

As the election date approached in January 2011, Issoufou, Oumarou, and Amadou were seen as the favourites; the latter two agreed to back each other if only one of them should enter the run-off.

== Results ==
=== President ===
Electoral Commission President Gousmane Abdourahmane announced on 4 February 2011 that PNDS candidate Issoufou and MNSD candidate Oumarou were the two first-placed candidates in the first round and would advance to the run-off. According to the results, Issoufou received 36.06% of the vote while Oumarou trailed with 23.2%. MODEN/FA candidate Hama Amadou placed third with 19.82% of the vote and CDS candidate Mahamane Ousmane placed fourth with 8.42%. As both Amadou and Ousmane had allied themselves with Oumarou and against Issoufou, it initially appeared that Oumarou could enter the second round in a strong position, but the solidity of the alliance was reportedly unclear.

MODEN/FA announced on 9 February 2011 that it was switching sides to support Issoufou rather than Oumarou in the second round. Although about 20 parties had backed Oumarou, the MODEN/FA defection suggested that Issoufou was likely to win, as Issoufou and Amadou received a combined total of more than 50% of the vote in the first round. The momentum continued to favor Issoufou, as another three candidates—Amadou Cheffou, Moussa Moumouni Djermakoye, and Amadou Boubacar Cisse—announced on 10 February that they had also decided to endorse Issoufou. Those three candidates had first-round scores in the single-digits, but together they represented about 10% of the first round vote.

On 22 February 2011, the Constitutional Council confirmed the results of the first round, ruling that Issoufou won 36.16% in the first round and would face Oumarou in a second round on 12 March.

Symbolically, the two second round candidates stood in sharp contrast: while Issoufou had been an opposition leader during Tandja's decade-long presidency, Oumarou had been one of Tandja's top associates and remained loyal to him. The two candidates appeared to have broadly similar campaign promises, however. They expressed their intentions to alleviate severe poverty and chronic food shortages and to better distribute the wealth produced through uranium mining so that it would be more beneficial to ordinary people. Because the National Assembly elected earlier in 2011 was widely perceived as unrepresentative due to flaws in the organization of the parliamentary election, both Issoufou and Oumarou said that they would dissolve the National Assembly and call a new election.

The second round was held as planned on 12 March 2011. Abdourahmane, the President of the Electoral Commission, announced on 14 March 2011 that Issoufou had won the election with 58% of the vote against 42% for Oumarou. Turnout was placed at about 48%, a slight decrease from the first round's turnout. Speaking at a press conference on the same day, Issoufou praised the conduct of the people during the election, saying that they had shown "great political maturity". He also offered praise to the junta for its conduct in overseeing a successful transition and a free and fair election.

On 16 March 2011, Oumarou announced that he accepted the results, congratulating Issoufou and wishing him success in governing the country. In choosing not to challenge the results, he said that he felt it was important that the country avoid "a new spiral of endless difficulties" and he stressed the importance of national reconciliation.

Candidate	Party	First round		Second round	
Candidate	Party	Votes	%	Votes	%
Mahamadou Issoufou	Nigerien Party for Democracy and Socialism	1,217,527	36.06	1,820,639	57.95
Seyni Oumarou	National Movement for the Society of Development	784,618	23.24	1,321,248	42.05
Hama Amadou	Nigerien Democratic Movement for an African Federation	669,153	19.82		
Mahamane Ousmane	Democratic and Social Convention	284,188	8.42		
Amadou Cheiffou	Social Democratic Rally	137,501	4.07		
Moussa Moumouni Djermakoye	Nigerien Alliance for Democracy and Progress	133,222	3.95		
Ousmane Issoufou Oubandawaki	Alliance for Democratic Renewal	65,077	1.93		
Amadou Cissé	Union for Democracy and the Republic	54,218	1.61		
Abdoulaye Amadou Traoré	Independent	18,116	0.54		
Mariama Gamatié Bayard	Independent	12,991	0.38		
Total		3,376,611	100.00	3,141,887	100.00
Valid votes		3,376,611	94.82	3,141,887	96.77
Invalid/blank votes		184,650	5.18	104,745	3.23
Total votes		3,561,261	100.00	3,246,632	100.00
Registered voters/turnout		6,740,493	52.83	6,740,046	48.17
Source: Constitutional Court - First round, Constitutional Court - Second round

=== National Assembly ===
Party	Votes	%	Seats	+/–
Nigerien Party for Democracy and Socialism	1,066,011	33.00	34	New
National Movement for the Society of Development	664,525	20.57	25	–51
Nigerien Democratic Movement for an African Federation	637,108	19.72	23	New
Nigerien Alliance for Democracy and Progress	242,770	7.51	8	New
Rally for Democracy and Progress	209,622	6.49	7	0
Union for Democracy and the Republic	175,876	5.44	6	New
Democratic and Social Convention	105,828	3.28	3	New
Social Democratic Rally	58,947	1.82	0	–15
Union of Independent Nigeriens	32,018	0.99	1	0
Alliance for Democratic Renewal	14,971	0.46	0	New
Nigerien Progressive Party – African Democratic Rally	12,549	0.39	0	New
Party for Socialism and Democracy in Niger	5,319	0.16	0	0
Rally of Nigerien Democrats for Reform	1,334	0.04	0	New
Rally of Independent Candidates for a New Niger	1,039	0.03	0	New
Nigerien Party for Development	990	0.03	0	New
Nigerien Party for the Reinforcement of Democracy	404	0.01	0	0
Union of Socialist Nigeriens	375	0.01	0	New
National Congress for Democratic Renewal	336	0.01	0	New
People's Democratic Party	186	0.01	0	0
Nigerien Convention for the Republic	56	0.00	0	New
Independents	234	0.01	0	–11
Invalidated			6	–
Total	3,230,498	100.00	113	0
Valid votes	3,230,498	97.36		
Invalid/blank votes	87,437	2.64		
Total votes	3,317,935	100.00		
Registered voters/turnout	6,740,493	49.22		
Source: Constitutional Court

Following the elections, the Constitutional Council annulled the results in Agadez Region. A by-election was held on 15 May, with the PNDS winning three seats, the MODEN/FA two seats and the MNSD one, giving new totals of 37 for the PNDS, 26 for the MNSD and 25 for MODEN/FA.
