= Seyni Oumarou =

President of the Nigerien National Assembly

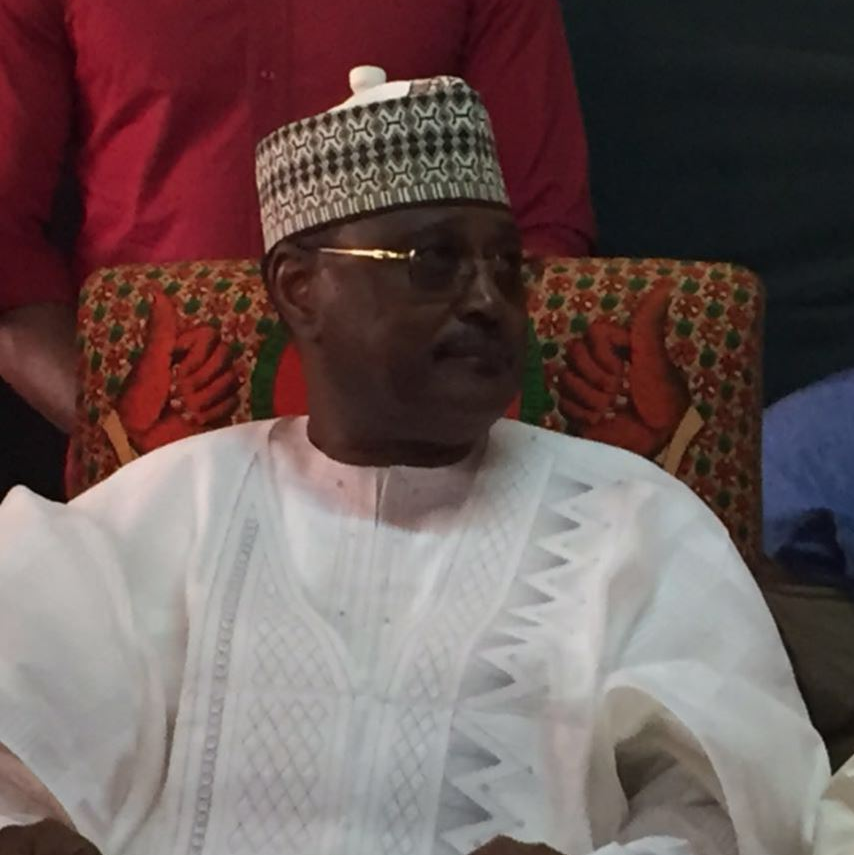

President of the National Assembly
- In office 23 March 2021 – 27 July 2023
- Preceded by: Ousseini Tinni

Prime Minister of Niger
- In office 7 June 2007 – 23 September 2009
- President: Tandja Mamadou
- Preceded by: Hama Amadou
- Succeeded by: Albadé Abouba (Acting)

Personal details
- Born: 9 August 1950 (age 75) Tillabéri, French West Africa (now Niger)
- Party: National Movement for the Development of Society

Seyni Oumarou (born 9 August 1950) is a Nigerien politician who was Prime Minister of Niger from June 2007 to September 2009 and President of the National Assembly of Niger from November 2009 to February 2010. He is from the west of the country and is a member of the Djerma ethnic group. Since November 2008, he has been the President of the National Movement for the Development of Society (MNSD). He unsuccessfully stood as a presidential candidate in 2011, 2016 and 2021. After years as an opposition leader under President Mahamadou Issoufou, he was appointed to the post of High Representative of the President in October 2016.

== Early career ==
Oumarou was born in Tillabéri. His family name, Seyni, usually precedes his given name, and is sometimes spelled Seini or Seïni. He was Director-General of the Nigerien Paper Transformation Enterprise (ENITRAP) from 1987 to 1998, and in 1995 became Special Adviser to Prime Minister Hama Amadou.

Oumarou was appointed to the government as Minister of Trade and Industry on April 16, 1999, under the transitional military regime of Daouda Malam Wanké. Following elections he remained in that position as part of the government of Hama Amadou (who returned as Prime Minister), which was named on January 5, 2000. He was then named Minister of Trade and Promotion of the Private Sector on September 17, 2001, and Minister of Trade, Industry, the Craft Industry, and the Promotion of the Private Sector on February 12, 2004. On November 12, 2004, following a number of resignations by ministers contesting that year's elections, Oumarou was additionally placed in charge of public health, the fight against endemic diseases, and hospital reforms, until he was named Minister of State for Equipment in a new government on December 30, 2004. In that position he was the third ranking member of the government (after Amadou and Minister of State Abdou Labo).

== As Prime Minister ==
Oumarou remained Minister of State for Equipment until Amadou and his government lost a no-confidence vote in the National Assembly on May 31, 2007. President Mamadou Tandja chose Oumarou to succeed Amadou as Prime Minister on June 3; Oumarou had been proposed for the position by the MNSD and was one of three candidates presented to Tandja by the National Assembly. Oumarou's appointment was opposed by the main opposition party, the Nigerien Party for Democracy and Socialism (PNDS), as well as a number of civil society organizations, because he was so closely associated with his predecessor and possibly tainted by the same corruption scandal related to embezzlement of education funds that caused the no-confidence vote against Amadou. Oumarou was sworn in as Prime Minister on June 7, and his new government was named on June 9, with 32 members (including Oumarou).

In 2007, Oumarou was President of the MNSD section in Tillabéri, as well as a vice-president of the MNSD National Political Bureau.

=== Tuareg conflict ===
Oumarou said on July 13, 2007, that the government would not negotiate with the Movement of Nigeriens for Justice rebel group in northern Niger.

=== Party conflict ===
As the criminal prosecution of former Prime Minister Hama Amadou continued in 2008, some parliamentary leaders of the MNSD-Nassara remained loyal to the former party chief. In June 2008, Amadou was arrested on charges of embezzlement. Despite conflict with some MNSD activists still loyal to Amadou, Oumarou was named interim head of the party.

In January 2009, Oumarou's government asked the National Assembly to strip three MNSD deputies of their immunity from prosecution. Shortly thereafter, Amadou supporters tabled a motion of no confidence against Oumarou.

=== 2009 and 2011 elections ===
In late 2008, supporters of President Tandja staged events calling for the extension of the President's second term, due to expire in December 2009. Counter-protests by opponents—including MNSD activists loyal to Amadou—followed over the course of several weeks. Thereafter Oumarou made statements indicating that the presidential, parliamentary and local elections would go ahead as planned.

In August 2009, a constitutional referendum providing for a three-year extension of Tandja's term was successful amidst an opposition boycott. A parliamentary election was planned for October 2009, and Oumarou headed the MNSD's candidate list in Tillabéri. Because he was standing as a parliamentary candidate, he had to resign from the government, and on September 24, 2009, state media reported that he had resigned, along with two other ministers who were also running. Albade Abouba, the Minister of the Interior, was appointed to replace him as Prime Minister in an acting capacity.

Following the parliamentary election, which was boycotted by the opposition, the Economic Community of West African States (ECOWAS)—which had wanted the election delayed in hopes of resolving the political crisis—suspended Niger from its ranks. Oumarou headed the 22-member Nigerien delegation that traveled to Abuja for talks with ECOWAS beginning on November 9, 2009.

Having won a seat in the National Assembly, Oumarou was elected as President of the National Assembly on November 25, 2009. The vote was unanimous, with all of the 109 deputies who were present voting in favor of his candidacy. Oumarou said on the occasion that he would work to restore the National Assembly's image in the wake of the controversies of the preceding months.

Dissatisfied by the ongoing political crisis, the military seized power on February 18, 2010, ousting Tandja and immediately dissolving the National Assembly. Unlike Tandja and Abouba, Oumarou was initially not detained by the new junta; however, he was arrested on 29 March 2010, along with a number of other high-ranking associates and loyalists of Tandja. According to Ousmane Cissé, the Minister of the Interior, they were arrested because they were involved in "subversive activities and undermining of the government and the transition process". Cissé stressed that any activity aimed at undermining the government or stirring unrest would be punished. Nevertheless, the junta released Oumarou and the others on 2 April 2010. Cissé, the Interior Minister, said that their "destabilisation operation" had been "neutralised" and that the suspects were being released "to calm things down".

A few months later, Oumarou was accused of embezzlement and arrested on 29 July 2010. The commission to Fight Financial Crime alleged that he owed the state 270 million CFA francs. The MNSD expressed outrage at the arrest of Oumarou, who was expected to be the MNSD's candidate for the January 2011 presidential election, and demanded his release; it said that the charge against him was a politically motivated effort to smear and marginalize the party. On 2 August 2010, Oumarou was charged and released on bail.

The MNSD announced on 10 August 2010 that Oumarou had been designated as its presidential candidate at a party congress. He was ultimately defeated by Mahamadou Issoufou in a second round of voting, held in March 2011.

On 29 November 2015, Oumarou was designated as the MNSD's candidate for the 2016 presidential election. He was again defeated by Issoufou, placing third in the first round. A few months after Issoufou's re-election, Oumarou announced in August 2016 that the MNSD was joining the "presidential majority" coalition of parties supporting Issoufou. That move was followed by the MNSD's inclusion in the government appointed on 19 October 2016 and the appointment of Oumarou as High Representative of President Issoufou on 20 October. In his new post as the President's representative, Oumarou was assigned broad responsibilities for "the conduct and management of political, economic or social projects" and was formally ranked fifth in state protocol.

Political offices
Preceded by Hama Amadou	Prime Minister of Niger; 2007–2009	Succeeded by Albadé Abouba; Acting
