= List of prime ministers of Niger =

Prime Minister of the Republic of Niger
- Premier ministre du Niger
- Coat of arms of Niger

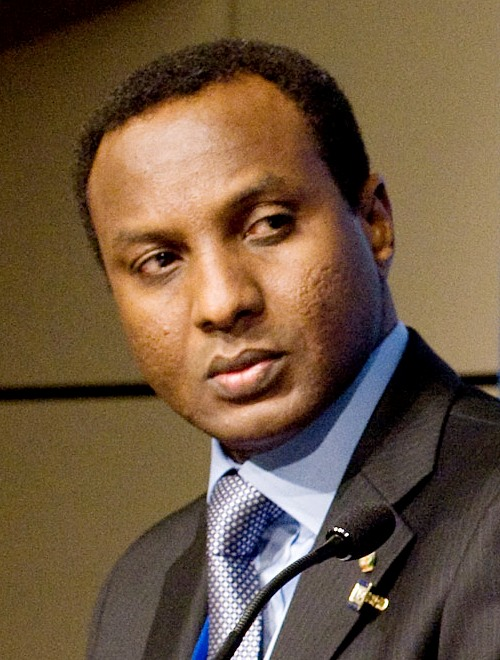
- Incumbent; Ali Lamine Zeine since 8 August 2023
- Government of Niger
- Type: Head of government
- Member of: Cabinet of Niger
- Seat: Niamey
- Appointer: President of Niger
- Formation: 24 January 1983; 43 years ago (Note: The office was established on 18 December 1958 as Chairman of the Council of Ministers, while Niger was part of the French Community.)
- First holder: Mamane Oumarou

This is a list of prime ministers of Niger since the formation of the post of Prime Minister of Niger in 1983 to the present day.

A total of fifteen people have served as Prime Minister of Niger (not counting one acting prime minister). Additionally, three persons, Mamane Oumarou, Amadou Cissé and Hama Amadou have served on two non-consecutive occasions.

The current prime minister of Niger is Ali Lamine Zeine, who was appointed by the National Council for the Safeguard of the Homeland led by General Abdourahamane Tiani on 8 August 2023, following a coup that overthrew President Mohamed Bazoum and the government of Prime Minister Ouhoumoudou Mahamadou.

== Position under presidential system (2009–2010) ==
Niger switched from semi-presidential republic to presidential system between 18 August 2009 and 25 November 2010, whereby the prime minister was not the head of government, but mainly existed in a capacity of assisting the president. Niger returned to semi-presidential system on 25 November 2010, whereby the prime minister was reinstated as head of government.

== List of officeholders ==
Political parties

National Movement for the Society of Development (MNSD–Nassara)
Nigerien Party for Democracy and Socialism (PNDS–Tarayya)
Democratic and Social Convention (CSD–Rahama)
Rally for Democracy and Progress (RDP–Jama'a)

Other factions

Independent

Status

Acting Prime Minister

No.	Portrait	Name (Birth–Death)	Term of office			Political party	Cabinet(s)	Head(s) of state	Ref.
No.	Portrait	Name (Birth–Death)	Took office	Left office	Time in office	Political party	Cabinet(s)	Head(s) of state	Ref.
1		Mamane Oumarou (born 1945)	24 January 1983	14 November 1983	294 days	Independent	—N/a	Kountché	
2		Hamid Algabid (born 1941)	14 November 1983	15 July 1988	4 years, 244 days	Independent	—N/a	Kountché	
2		Hamid Algabid (born 1941)	14 November 1983	15 July 1988	4 years, 244 days	Independent	—N/a	Saibou	
(1)		Mamane Oumarou (born 1945)	15 July 1988	20 December 1989	1 year, 158 days	MNSD–Nassara	—N/a	Saibou	
Post abolished (20 December 1989 – 2 March 1990)
3		Aliou Mahamidou (1947–1996)	2 March 1990	27 October 1991	1 year, 239 days	MNSD–Nassara	—N/a	Saibou	
4		Amadou Cheiffou (born 1942)	27 October 1991	17 April 1993	1 year, 172 days	Independent	—N/a	Saibou	
4		Amadou Cheiffou (born 1942)	27 October 1991	17 April 1993	1 year, 172 days	Independent	—N/a	Ousmane	
5		Mahamadou Issoufou (born 1952)	17 April 1993	28 September 1994	1 year, 164 days	PNDS–Tarayya	—N/a	Ousmane	
6		Souley Abdoulaye (1956–2023)	28 September 1994	8 February 1995	133 days	CSD–Rahama	—N/a	Ousmane	
7		Amadou Cissé (born 1948)	8 February 1995	21 February 1995	13 days	Independent	—N/a	Ousmane	
8		Hama Amadou (1950–2024)	21 February 1995	27 January 1996 (deposed)	340 days	MNSD–Nassara	—N/a	Ousmane	
Post vacant (27 – 30 January 1996)
9		Boukary Adji (1939–2018)	30 January 1996	21 December 1996	326 days	Independent	—N/a	Maïnassara	
(7)		Amadou Cissé (born 1948)	21 December 1996	27 November 1997	341 days	RDP–Jama'a	—N/a	Maïnassara	
10		Ibrahim Hassane Mayaki (born 1951)	27 November 1997	1 January 2000	2 years, 35 days	RDP–Jama'a	—N/a	Maïnassara	
10		Ibrahim Hassane Mayaki (born 1951)	27 November 1997	1 January 2000	2 years, 35 days	RDP–Jama'a	—N/a	Wanké	
10		Ibrahim Hassane Mayaki (born 1951)	27 November 1997	1 January 2000	2 years, 35 days	RDP–Jama'a	—N/a	Tandja	
(8)		Hama Amadou (1950–2024)	1 January 2000	7 June 2007	7 years, 157 days	MNSD–Nassara	Amadou I	Tandja	
(8)		Hama Amadou (1950–2024)	1 January 2000	7 June 2007	7 years, 157 days	MNSD–Nassara	Amadou II	Tandja	
(8)		Hama Amadou (1950–2024)	1 January 2000	7 June 2007	7 years, 157 days	MNSD–Nassara	Amadou III	Tandja	
(8)		Hama Amadou (1950–2024)	1 January 2000	7 June 2007	7 years, 157 days	MNSD–Nassara	Amadou IV	Tandja	
11		Seyni Oumarou (born 1951)	7 June 2007	23 September 2009	2 years, 108 days	MNSD–Nassara	Oumarou	Tandja	
–		Albadé Abouba	23 September 2009	2 October 2009	9 days	MNSD–Nassara	Oumarou	Tandja	
12		Ali Badjo Gamatié (born 1957)	2 October 2009	18 February 2010 (deposed)	139 days	MNSD–Nassara	Oumarou	Tandja	
Post vacant (18 – 23 February 2010)
13		Mahamadou Danda (born 1951)	23 February 2010	7 April 2011	1 year, 43 days	Independent	Danda	Djibo	
14		Brigi Rafini (born 1953)	7 April 2011	2 April 2021	9 years, 360 days	PNDS–Tarayya	Rafini I	Issoufou	
14		Brigi Rafini (born 1953)	7 April 2011	2 April 2021	9 years, 360 days	PNDS–Tarayya	Rafini II	Issoufou	
15		Ouhoumoudou Mahamadou (born 1954)	3 April 2021	26 July 2023 (deposed)	2 years, 114 days	PNDS–Tarayya	Mahamadou	Bazoum	
Post vacant (26 July – 8 August 2023)
16		Ali Lamine Zeine (born 1965)	8 August 2023	Incumbent	3 years, 33 days	Independent (Note: Affiliated with the MNSD–Nassara until 26 March 2025.)	Zeine	Tiani	

== See also ==
- Politics of Niger
- List of heads of state of Niger
- Vice President of Niger
- List of colonial governors of Niger
