= Democratic and Social Convention =

Political party in Niger

Democratic and Social Convention Convention démocratique et sociale
- Leader: Abdou Labo
- Founded: 5 January 1991
- Dissolved: 27 July 2023 (Activities suspended); 26 March 2025
- Newspaper: Rahama Tribune
- Ideology: Social democracy Historical faction: Conservatism
- Political position: Centre to Centre-left
- National affiliation: AFC

The Democratic and Social Convention – Rahama (French: Convention démocratique et sociale-Rahama, CDS-Rahama) was a political party in Niger.

== History ==
It was founded in January 1991. In the February 1993 parliamentary elections the party won 22 of the 83 seats in the National Assembly, finishing second to the pro-military National Movement for the Development of Society (MNDS). In the subsequent presidential elections, CDS-Rahama leader Mahamane Ousmane was elected president, defeating the MNSD' Mamadou Tandja. In 1995 Ousmane called early parliamentary elections, which saw it gain two seats, but remain the second largest party behind the MNSD. In January 1996 he was ousted in a coup. In presidential elections held in July that year, Ousmane finished second to coup leader Ibrahim Baré Maïnassara. The party boycotted the parliamentary elections later that year.

Since 1999, the CDS has been in an alliance with the MNSD, forming part of the parliamentary majority and participating in the government; it did not nominate a presidential candidate in the 1999 general elections, but won 17 seats in the National Assembly, which Ousmane became President of. In the 2004 general elections, Ousmane was the CDS presidential candidate for the fourth time, finishing third with 17.4% of the vote. In the parliamentary elections, the party received 17.4% of the popular vote and won 22 of the 113 seats. Following the election, the MNSD resumed its coalition government with CDS-Rahama, whose 22 seats give the President and Prime Minister a 69-seat majority in the National Assembly, with Ousmane re-elected as President of the National Assembly.

The CDS held its sixth congress on 1 September 2007.

On 25 June 2009, after President of Niger Mamadou Tandja dismissed the National Assembly over his plans to hold a constitutional referendum, the CDS announced its final break with the MNSD government. The party withdrew from the government coalition and pulled its eight members from the Nigerien Council of Ministers. In a statement, the CDS demanded the President definitively submit to the Court's decision. The party also announced the creation of its own opposition coalition, the Movement for the Defence of Democracy (MDD) along with around five smaller parties including the UDR and the PDP. The group was in direct competition with the larger opposition front, the Front for the Defence of Democracy (FDD) led by the PNDS, and staged the two anti-referendum marches in Niamey.

The party boycotted the October 2009 parliamentary elections. Following a 2010 coup, it ran in the 2011 general elections; Ousmane finished fourth in the presidential ballot with 8% of the vote, whilst the party won only three seats in the National Assembly. In the 2016 general elections the party nominated Abdou Labo as its presidential candidate; he finished seventh in a field of fifteen candidates with 2% of the vote. In the National Assembly elections, the party retained its three seats.
