= National Assembly (Niger) =

Legislative body of Niger

Coordinates: 13°30′41″N 2°06′52″E

National Assembly Assemblée nationale

Type
- Type: Unicameral

History
- Founded: 1960
- Seats: 171 members

Elections
- Voting system: Proportional representation
- Last election: 27 December 2020
- Next election: 2030

Meeting place
- The National Assembly Building, Niamey

Website
- www.assemblee.ne

The unicameral National Assembly (French: Assemblée nationale) was Niger's elected legislative body. The National Assembly proposed laws and was required to approve all legislation.

It was suspended following the 2023 Nigerien coup d'état by the military junta. A new legislative body Transitional Advisory Council was appointed by the military junta in July 2025 for a period of five years.

== Legislative history ==
Territorial Assembly was established in 1958 in the Colony of Niger. It was succeeded by National Assembly upon independence in 1960. It had 60 deputies from a single party, Parti Progressiste Nigérien (PPN-RDA), and had no real decision-making power. The National Assembly was dissolved after the 1974 Nigerien coup d'état.

During the course of military rule (1974–1991) a consultative body (the High Council of the Republic of Niger) was reformed to become analogous to a National Assembly. This functioned as a caretaker National Assembly during the Constitutional Convention period of the Second Republic (1991–1993).

Multiparty rule was established in 1993 in the Third Republic, and the new National Assembly had 83 deputies at that time. Following the 1996 Nigerien coup d'état the National Assembly was again suspended, and reinstituted in 1997 under the Fourth Republic. Again, following the 1999 Nigerien coup d'état, the National Assembly was suspended, but this time was reconstituted within the year under the Fifth Republic (1999–2009).

On 27 May 2009, the National Assembly was dissolved by Tandja Mamadou after his plan to hold a referendum was rejected by the Constitutional Court. Although the court and the National Assembly had only a non-binding advisory role over Tandja's referendum plan, statements by MNSD-Nassara's coalition partners CDS-Rahama indicate the MNSD Prime Minister of Niger, as well as the President, would be open to a censure motion in the assembly. According to the 1999 constitution, the President is limited to stand for reelection once: Tandja's second five-year term was to end on 22 December 2009. The purpose of the proposed referendum was to scrap the Constitution of the Fifth Republic, creating a new Sixth Republic prior to the November Presidential elections. Constitutionally, the articles dealing with presidential terms (article 36) may not be revised by any method (article 136). According to President Tandja, the people of Niger want him to stay because he has boosted the economy of Niger. The opposition described this act as dictatorship, calling for protests: a continuation of demonstrations which began in December 2008.

=== Transitional Advisory Council ===
The National Assembly was suspended once again following the 2023 Nigerien coup d'état. A new legislative body Transitional Advisory Council was appointed by the military junta in July 2025 for a period of five years until 2030. This body has 194 members appointed by the junta. The Speaker of the Advisory Council is Mamoudou Harouna Djingarey.

== Powers ==
Under the Constitution of the Fifth Republic (18 July 1999), the National Assembly has oversight of the executive in voting on legislation, overriding a Presidential veto, voting no confidence in the Prime Minister, and the reserved right of nominating the Prime Minister. As well, the Assembly has recourse to publicly investigate the executive through committee hearings, hearing in plenary sittings, commissions of enquiry, formal parliamentary questions, "Question Time", and interpellations. There is no formal parliamentary ombudsman oversight of government.

Under a presidential system of government briefly instituted in 2009–2010, the National Assembly had no power over the selection of the Prime Minister and could not hold a vote of no confidence in the government; however, it also could not be dissolved by the President. As part of the constitutional change, the introduction of a Senate was planned, at which point the National Assembly would have become the lower house of a bicameral parliament.

However, all the changes proved abortive, as President Mamadou Tandja, who had orchestrated them, was ousted in a February 2010 coup. Mahamadou Issoufou was elected in the 2011 election and the National Assembly's powers were restored.

== Composition ==
The current National Assembly, formed following elections held on 21 February 2016, has 171 members, up from 113 members in 2003, elected for a five-year term. The multi-seat constituency members are elected using a party-list (Scrutin de liste) proportional representation system. The remaining eight seats are single constituency, elected by a first-past-the-post system. One element of the Judiciary of Niger, the High Court of Justice, is composed of Deputies elected from within the National Assembly.

Member of the National Assembly for the Nigerien Party for Democracy and Socialism (PNDS), Ousseini Tinni, was chosen to be the President of the National Assembly after the 2016 elections.

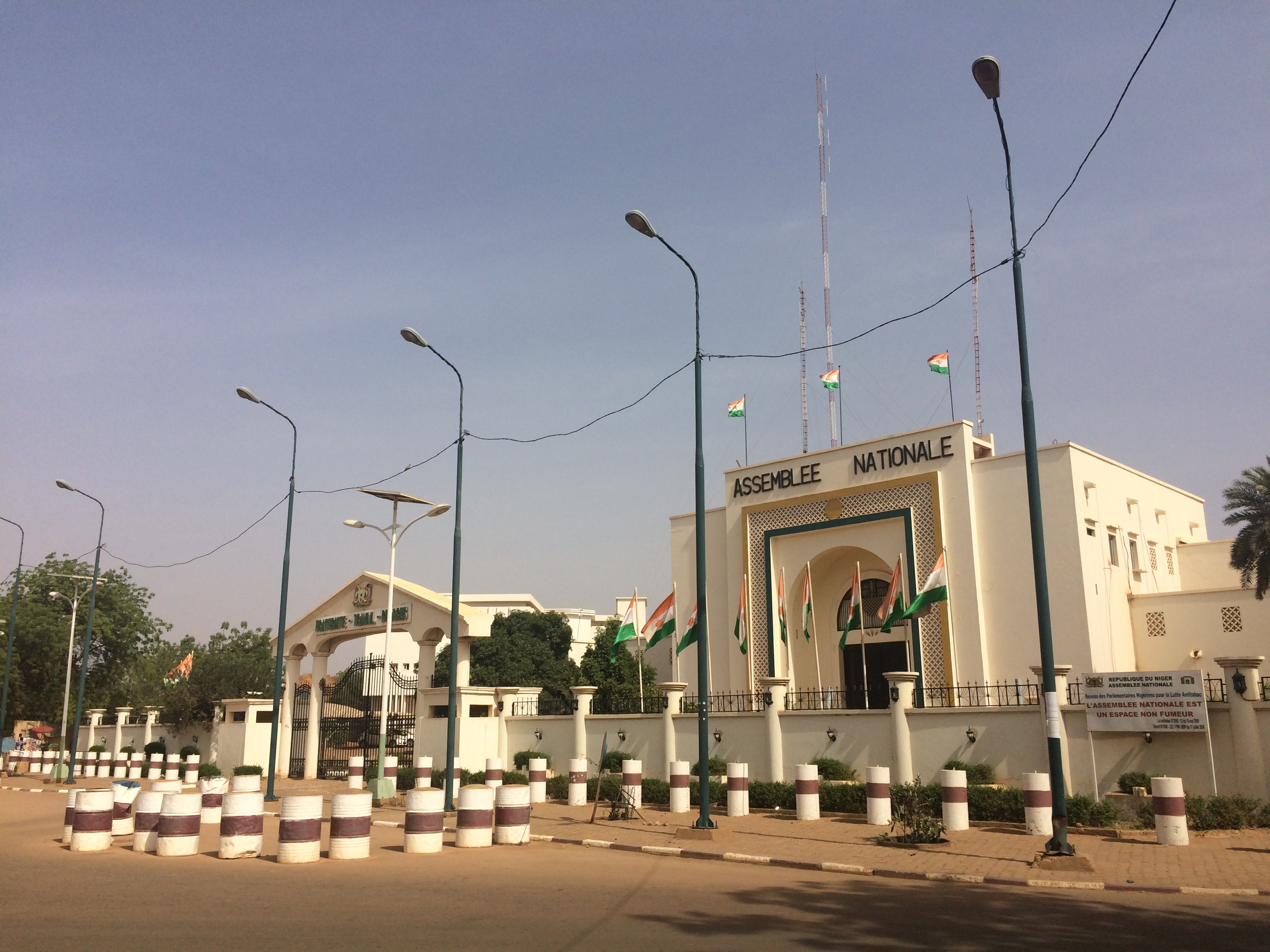
The National Assembly.

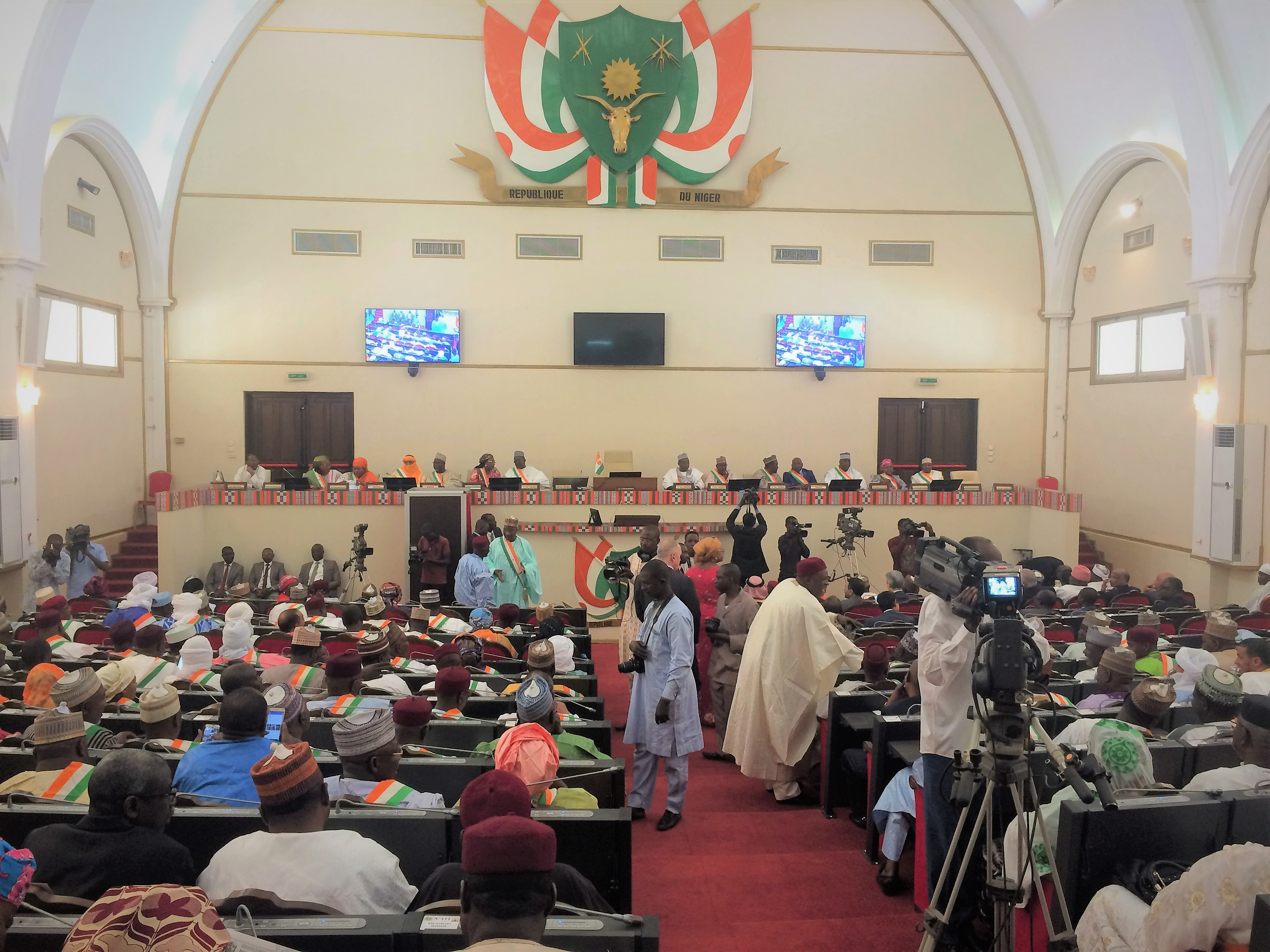
The Assembly in session.

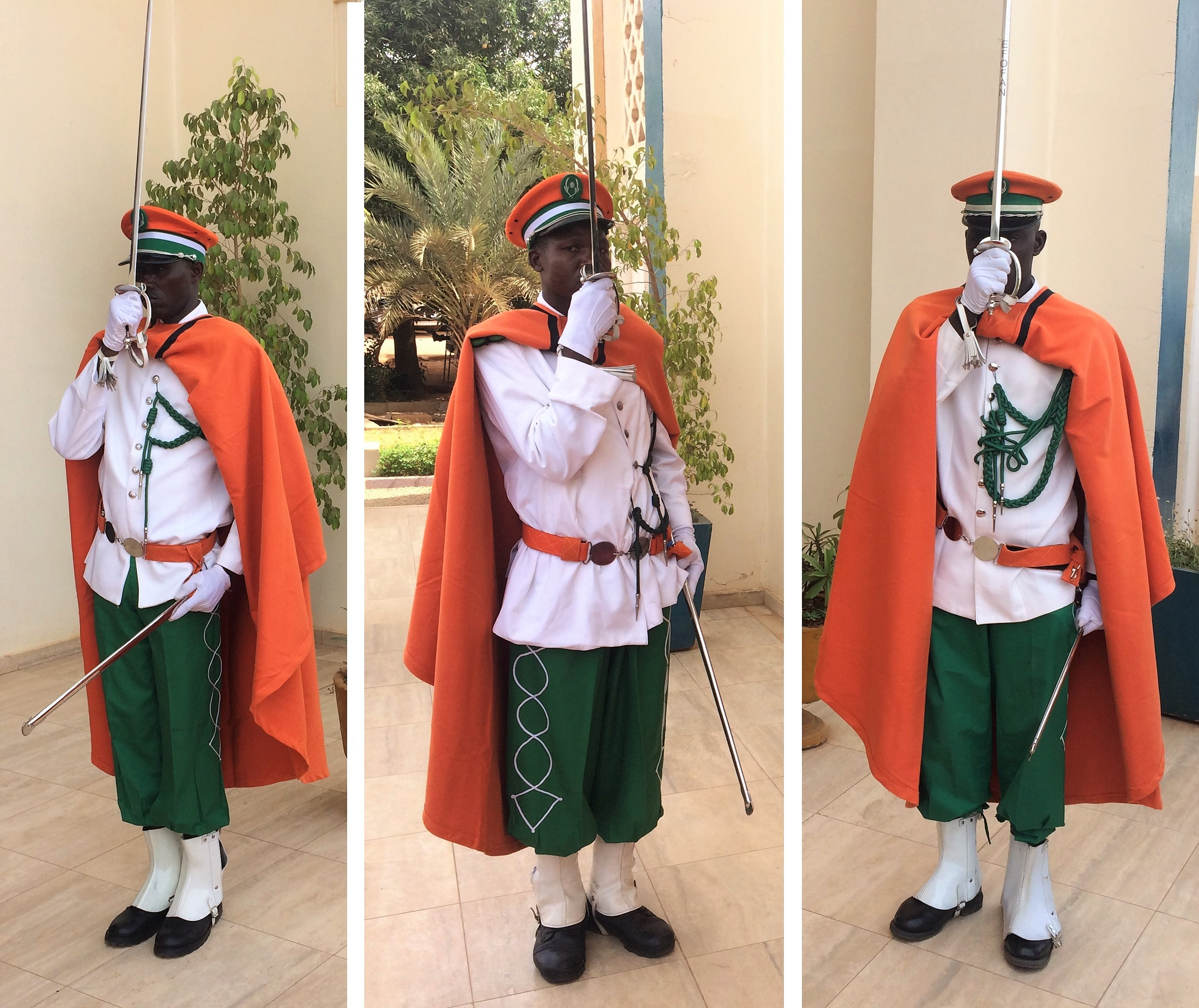
Guards of Honour at the National Assembly.

== Sessions ==
The National Assembly sits for two "ordinary" sessions a year, usually the first during March–June and the second from August to October, meeting at the National Assembly Building in Niamey. So-called "extraordinary" sessions, lasting from a few hours to a week, occur two or more times a year.

Since the year 2000, the National Assembly has ratified between 10 and 30 laws, spending plans, and treaties in each ordinary session. The internal functioning of the Assembly is governed by the 1999 Constitution of the 5th Republic and by the Law n° 97 – 006/AN of 5 June 1997.

== See also ==
- Government of Niger
- 2023 Nigerien Crisis
- History of Niger
- Legislature
- List of legislatures by country
- List of presidents of the National Assembly of Niger
