= Abdoul Ramane Seydou =

Nigerien officer and politician

Minister of Youth and Sports
- In office November 20, 1987 – September 10, 1991

Deputy Chief of Staff of the Nigerien Armed Forces
- In office February 11, 1996 – August 23, 1996

Personal details
- Born: 1949 (age 76–77) Birni-N'Konni, Niger

Abdoul Ramane Seydou (born 1949) is a Nigerien officer and politician.

== Biography ==
Abdoul Ramane Seydou volunteered for the Nigerien Armed Forces in 1967 after completing primary and secondary school. He attended the Officer Candidate School in Bouaké in 1975 and, upon his return in 1977, was promoted to second lieutenant and deputy commander of Seyni Kountché's Presidential Guard. In 1983, he became deputy commander of the 7th Sahara Motorized Company and, in 1985, commander of the 1st Armored Squadron. He had already held the rank of captain by 1984. Seydou was appointed military attaché at the Nigerien embassy in Paris in November 1987, then Minister of Youth, Sports and Culture on November 20, 1987, shortly after the death of President Kountché. He participated in the founding congress of the MNSD-Nassara unity party in May 1989, where he became youth party secretary. In 1990, he was promoted to the rank of major in the armed forces. Seydou lost his ministerial post when the National Conference, which was preparing the transition to a multi-party system, deposed the MNSD-Nassara government on September 10, 1991. He became head of the 3rd Bureau of the General Staff of the Armed Forces in 1992 and commander of the Republican Guard in 1995, and was promoted to lieutenant colonel. He was also elected vice-president of the national football federation, the Fédération Nigérienne de Football, in 1995.

Abdoul Ramane Seydou was involved in the military coup of January 27, 1996, which ousted the democratically elected but deeply divided political elite: President Mahamane Ousmane (CDS-Rahama), President of the National Assembly Mahamadou Issoufou (PNDS-Tarayya), and Prime Minister Hama Amadou (MNSD-Nassara). Seydou was a member and spokesperson of the Council of National Welfare, the twelve-member military junta chaired by Ibrahim Baré Maïnassara that ruled the country until December 1996. From February 11, 1996, he was initially Deputy Chief of Staff of the Nigerien Armed Forces until August 23, 1996, when he was appointed Minister of Youth, Sports, and National Solidarity, a post he held until November 24, 1997. The coup leader Baré Maïnassara remained in power as president and founded the RDP-Jama'a party in August 1997 with Abdoul Ramane Seydou as secretary general. On 1 December 1997, Seydou again took over the portfolios of youth, sports and national solidarity in the Nigerien government with the honorary rank of Minister of State. His term of office ended on 9 April 1999 with the overthrow of the government by the military coup led by Daouda Malam Wanké . In June 1999, Seydou also lost his position as secretary general of the RDP-Jama'a, which he regained in January 2001. He retired from the Nigerien Armed Forces in June 2001.

In the government formed on December 30, 2004, following the 2004 parliamentary and presidential elections, under President Mamadou Tandja and Prime Minister Hama Amadou (both MNSD-Nassara), Seydou became Minister for Youth, Sports and Games of La Francophonie. Niger hosted the 5th Games of La Francophonie in 2005. In the subsequent governments formed on March 1, 2007, under Prime Minister Hama Amadou and on June 9, 2007, under Prime Minister Seini Oumarou (both MNSD-Nassara), Seydou remained Minister for Youth and Sports. In 2008, he was voted out of office as Secretary General of the CDS-Rahama. He was succeeded in office by Sani Abdourahmane. The Confederation of African Football (CAF) disqualified the Nigerien U-17 national football team from participating in the 2009 African Under-17 Championship when it emerged that player Boubacar Talatou was not 17, as stated, but 22 years old. Although there was officially no connection to this affair, Ramane Seydou resigned. He was succeeded as Minister of Youth and Sports by Salou Gobi on 14 May 2009.

== Honors ==
- Commander of the National Order of Niger
