= List of heads of state of Niger =

President of the Republic of Niger
- Président du République du Niger
- Coat of arms of Niger

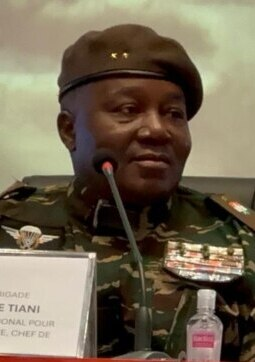
- Incumbent; Abdourahamane Tiani since 28 July 2023 (Note: As President of the National Council for the Safeguard of the Homeland until 26 March 2025, when he was additionally sworn in as President of the Republic.)
- Style: Mr. President; His Excellency
- Type: Head of state Transitional head of government under the CNSP
- Seat: Niamey
- Precursor: High Commissioner of Niger
- Formation: 10 November 1960; 65 years ago (Note: The office was established on 18 December 1958 as Chairman of the Council of Ministers, while Niger was part of the French Community.)
- First holder: Hamani Diori
- Deputy: Vice President
- Website: Présidence de la République du Niger

This is a list of heads of state of Niger since the country gained independence from France in 1960 to the present day.

A total of eleven people (not counting one acting) have served as head of state of Niger, with six of them military rulers.

The current head of state of Niger is Abdourahamane Tiani, the president of the National Council for the Safeguard of the Homeland (CNSP), a military junta established following a coup that overthrew President Mohamed Bazoum, on 26 July 2023; additionally, Tchiani was formally sworn in as president of the republic on 26 March 2025, for the term of five years.

== Term limits ==
As of 2021, there is a two-term limit for the president in the Constitution of Niger. The first president who adhered to the term limits was Mahamadou Issoufou in 2021.

== Titles ==
- 1958–1960: Chairman of the Council of Ministers
- 1960–1974: President of the Republic
- 1974: Chief of the General Staff of the Army
- 1974–1989: Chairman/President of the Supreme Military Council
- 1989: President of the Supreme Council of National Orientation (Note: Also styled as President of the Supreme National Guidance Council.)
- 1989–1996: President of the Republic
- 1996: Chairman/President of the National Salvation Council
- 1996–1999: President of the Republic
- 1999: Chairman/President of the National Reconciliation Council
- 1999–2010: President of the Republic
- 2010–2011: Chairman of the Supreme Council for the Restoration of Democracy
- 2011–2023: President of the Republic
- 2023: National Council for the Safeguard of the Homeland (Collective leadership)
- 2023–present: President of the National Council for the Safeguard of the Homeland
- 2025–present: President of the Republic

== List of officeholders ==
Political parties

Nigerien Progressive Party – African Democratic Rally (PPN–RDA)
National Movement for the Society of Development (MNSD–Nassara)
Democratic and Social Convention (CSD–Rahama)
National Union of Independents for Democratic Renewal (UNIRD) / Rally for Democracy and Progress (RDP–Jama'a)
Nigerien Party for Democracy and Socialism (PNDS–Tarayya)

Other factions

Military

No.	Portrait	Name (Birth–Death)	Term of office			Political party	Elected	Cabinet(s)	Prime minister(s)	Ref.
No.	Portrait	Name (Birth–Death)	Took office	Left office	Time in office	Political party	Elected	Cabinet(s)	Prime minister(s)	Ref.
1		Hamani Diori (1916–1989)	10 November 1960	15 April 1974 (deposed)	13 years, 156 days	PPN–RDA	1960	Diori I	Position not established	
1		Hamani Diori (1916–1989)	10 November 1960	15 April 1974 (deposed)	13 years, 156 days	PPN–RDA	1965	Diori II	Position not established	
1		Hamani Diori (1916–1989)	10 November 1960	15 April 1974 (deposed)	13 years, 156 days	PPN–RDA	1970	Diori III	Position not established	
2		Seyni Kountché (1931–1987)	15 April 1974	10 November 1987 #	13 years, 209 days	Military	—	Kountché	Position not established Oumarou; Algabid	
3		Ali Saibou (1940–2011)	10 November 1987	16 April 1993	5 years, 157 days	Military / MNSD–Nassara	—	—N/a	Algabid; Oumarou; Mahamidou; Cheiffou	
3		Ali Saibou (1940–2011)	10 November 1987	16 April 1993	5 years, 157 days	Military / MNSD–Nassara	1989	—N/a	Algabid; Oumarou; Mahamidou; Cheiffou	
4		Mahamane Ousmane (born 1950)	16 April 1993	27 January 1996 (deposed)	2 years, 286 days	CSD–Rahama	1993	—N/a	Cheiffou; Issoufou; Abdoulaye; Cissé; Amadou	
5		Ibrahim Baré Maïnassara (1949–1999)	27 January 1996	9 April 1999 X	3 years, 72 days	Military / UNIRD / RDP–Jama'a	1996	—N/a	Adji; Cissé; Mayaki	
6		Daouda Malam Wanké (1946–2004)	9 April 1999	22 December 1999	257 days	Military	—	—N/a	Mayaki	
7		Mamadou Tandja (1938–2020)	22 December 1999	18 February 2010 (deposed)	10 years, 58 days	MNSD–Nassara	1999	—N/a	Mayaki; Amadou; Oumarou; Abouba; Gamatié	
7		Mamadou Tandja (1938–2020)	22 December 1999	18 February 2010 (deposed)	10 years, 58 days	MNSD–Nassara	2004	—N/a	Mayaki; Amadou; Oumarou; Abouba; Gamatié	
8		Salou Djibo (born 1965)	18 February 2010	7 April 2011	1 year, 48 days	Military	—	—N/a	Danda	
9		Mahamadou Issoufou (born 1952)	7 April 2011	2 April 2021	9 years, 360 days	PNDS–Tarayya	2011	—N/a	Rafini	
9		Mahamadou Issoufou (born 1952)	7 April 2011	2 April 2021	9 years, 360 days	PNDS–Tarayya	2016	—N/a	Rafini	
10		Mohamed Bazoum (born 1960)	2 April 2021	26 July 2023 (deposed)	2 years, 115 days	PNDS–Tarayya	2020–2021	—N/a	Mahamadou	
–		Collective leadership (Note: Members: Amadou Abdramane and nine others; Abdourahamane Tiani was the real leader during that period.)	26 July 2023	28 July 2023	2 days	Military	—	—N/a	—	
11		Abdourahamane Tiani (born 1964)	28 July 2023	Incumbent	3 years, 44 days	Military	—	—N/a	Zeine	

== Latest election ==
Candidate	Party	First round		Second round	
Candidate	Party	Votes	%	Votes	%
Mohamed Bazoum	Nigerien Party for Democracy and Socialism	1,879,629	39.30	2,490,049	55.67
Mahamane Ousmane	Democratic and Republican Renewal	812,412	16.99	1,983,072	44.33
Seyni Oumarou	National Movement for the Society of Development	428,083	8.95		
Albadé Abouba	Patriotic Movement for the Republic	338,511	7.08		
Ibrahim Yacouba	Nigerien Patriotic Movement	257,302	5.38		
Salou Djibo	Peace, Justice, Progress – Generation Doubara	142,747	2.98		
Oumarou Malam Alma	Rally for Peace and Progress	118,259	2.47		
Hassane Baraze Moussa	Nigerien Alliance for Democracy and Progress	114,965	2.40		
Omar Hamidou Tchana	Alliance of Movements for the Emergence of Niger	76,368	1.60		
Amadou Ousmane	Democratic Alternation for Fairness in Niger	63,396	1.33		
Souleymane Garba	Niger Party of Change – Mu Lura	61,158	1.28		
Idi Ango Ousmane	Alliance for Democracy and the Republic – Mahita	56,100	1.17		
Nayoussa Nassirou	Convention for Democracy and Social Progress	41,697	0.87		
Ibrahim Gado	Republican Council for Progress and Democracy	39,319	0.82		
Mounkaila Issa	Nigerien Rally for Democracy and Peace	38,604	0.81		
Hamidou Mamadou Abdou	African National Gathering Party	35,934	0.75		
Intinicar Alhassane	Nigerien Party for Peace and Development	30,995	0.65		
Abdoulkadri Alpha	Gayya Zabbe	28,910	0.60		
Kane Habibou	Synergy of Democrats for the Republic	27,162	0.57		
Oumarou Abdourahamane	Union for Patriotic Pan-Africanists	20,488	0.43		
Moustapha Moustapha	Party for a Political Revolution in Niger	20,365	0.43		
Amadou Saidou	Independent	20,156	0.42		
Mahaman Hamissou Moumouni	Party for Justice and Development – Hakika	18,585	0.39		
Djibrilla Mainassara	Sawaba	17,233	0.36		
Sagbo Adolphe	Socialist Party	17,060	0.36		
Idrissa Issoufou	Citizen's Movement for Development	16,995	0.36		
Amadou Cissé	Union for Democracy and the Republic	16,835	0.35		
Mamadou Doulla	Redemption for the Sake of the Fatherland	16,768	0.35		
Abdallah Souleymane	Niger Forward (Nigerena)	14,282	0.30		
Ismael Ide	Action Front for a New Niger	12,062	0.25		
Total		4,782,380	100.00	4,473,121	100.00
Valid votes		4,782,380	92.16	4,473,121	95.48
Invalid/blank votes		406,752	7.84	211,658	4.52
Total votes		5,189,132	100.00	4,684,779	100.00
Registered voters/turnout		7,446,556	69.68	7,446,556	62.91
Source: Constitutional Court - First round Constitutional Court - Second round

== See also ==
- Politics of Niger
- List of prime ministers of Niger
- Vice President of Niger
- List of colonial governors of Niger
