= Corruption in Niger =

Corruption in Niger has a long history in pre-colonial and colonial era, as well as in the current state and has been a pervasive issue in the country's political, economic, and social landscape. The colonial administration mismanaged public funds, leading to inefficiencies and waste. Corrupt officials often went unpunished, perpetuating a culture of corruption.

== History ==
=== Pre-colonial era ===
Corruption existed in various forms in pre-colonial Niger, with instances of embezzlement, nepotism, and bribery among traditional leaders and traders. During the colonial era, corruption was prevalent among French colonial officials and African collaborators.

=== Colonial era (1920-1960) ===
French colonial rule introduced modern forms of corruption, including cronyism, and exploitation of natural resources. Governor-General Jean Moulin (1937-1940) embezzled funds meant for development projects, using them to build his personal mansion in Niamey. Colonel Paul Nougues (1940-1942) diverted funds intended for the military to his own accounts and French companies such as Compagnie Française de l'Afrique Occidentale (CFAO) and Société Minière de l'Air (SMA) extracted Niger's natural resources (uranium, gold, livestock) with little benefit to the local population. The French colonial administration forced Nigeriens to work in exploitative conditions in mines and on cotton plantations.

French officials accepted bribes from companies in exchange for favorable treatment and contracts. African collaborators such as Chief Amadou Djibo (1930s-1940s) used their positions to accumulate wealth and influence through corrupt means.

Colonial officials such as Commandant Léon Riou (1920s) used coercion and intimidation to maintain control over local populations. The French colonial administration imposed heavy taxes, forced labor, and land expropriation on Nigeriens.

The "Scandale des subsistances" (1935) saw French officials embezzle funds meant for food supplies, leading to widespread famine among the local population. The "Affaire des mines d'uranium" (1940s) involved French companies and officials colluding to exploit Niger's uranium resources, ignoring safety and environmental concerns.

=== Post-colonial era (1960-1999) ===
Following independence, corruption became more entrenched, with President Hamani Diori and his successor, Seyni Kountché, with accusations of embezzlement and nepotism. Corruption during Niger's post-colonial era was widespread and deeply ingrained. President Hamani Diori (1960-1974) took millions of dollars in public funds, awarded lucrative contracts to cronies and family members, and accumulated vast tracts of land and property.

President Seyni Kountché (1974-1987) established a repressive regime marked by human rights abuses, stole funds meant for development projects, and favored cronies and family members in business deals.

President Ali Saibou (1987-1993) continued the corrupt practices of his predecessors, mismanaged the country's economy, and faced allegations of embezzlement and nepotism.

President Mahamane Ousmane (1993-1996) failed to address corruption and nepotism, faced allegations of embezzlement and abuse of power, and was ousted in a military coup.

The Uranium Gate scandal saw officials use funds for personal expenses meant for the development of the uranium industry. The Food Crisis scandal involved government officials and businessmen embezzling funds meant for food imports, exacerbating a severe famine. The National Housing Scheme scandal saw officials embezzle funds meant for a national housing project, leaving thousands of Nigeriens without homes.

=== Military rule (1999-1999) ===
The military regime of Ibrahim Baré Maïnassara was marked by widespread corruption, including embezzlement and human rights abuses.

The regime, led by Major Daouda Malam Wanké, was marked by embezzlement, with military officials looting public funds and assets, enriching themselves and their members.

Nepotism was also rampant, with Wanké favoring family members and close associate's in business deals and government appointments. Military officials used their positions to intimidate and exploit civilians, extorting money and resources. Corruption and human rights abuses went unpunished, perpetuating a culture of impunity. The Petromiangate scandal saw military officials embezzle funds meant for fuel imports, leading to widespread shortages and price hikes. The CFAO scandal involved the embezzlement of funds from the state-owned company CFAO, meant for agricultural development.

Human rights abuses were widespread, with military officials committing extrajudicial killings, torture, and arbitrary arrests, often for personal gain. The military regime's corruption and brutality sparked widespread protests, leading to Wanké's ouster in April 1999.

=== Democratic era (1999-2009) ===
The return to democracy saw some efforts to combat corruption, but it remained a significant problem, with President Mamadou Tandja accused of embezzlement and electoral fraud. Mamadou Tandja and his officials looted public funds, misappropriating millions of dollars meant for development projects. Tandja favored family members and close associates in the business deals, government appointments, and access to state resources.

He and his officials used their positions to intimidate and exploit civilians, suppressing political opposition and dissent. Corruption and human rights abuses went unpunished, perpetuating a culture of impunity.

The Uranium Gate scandal saw Tandja's regime embezzle funds meant for the development of the uranium industry. The Petromiangate scandal involved officials embezzling funds meant for fuel imports, leading to widespread shortages and price hikes. The CFAO scandal saw Tandja's regime embezzle funds from the state-owned company CFAO, meant for agricultural development.

The Imouraren scandal involved Tandja's regime embezzling funds meant for the development of the Imouraren uranium mine. Tandja's regime was marked by widespread corruption, nepotism, and abuse of power, leading to his overthrow in a military coup in 2010. The regime's corruption and impunity had a lasting impact on Niger's political and economic landscape.

=== Coup and political unrest (2009-2011) ===
The military coup that overthrew President Tandja led to a period of political instability, during which corruption continued to thrive.

The military junta, led by Salou Djibo, and political elites exploited the political chaos for personal gain. Embezzlement and misappropriation of public funds were widespread, with military officials and political leaders looting state resources. Nepotism and cronyism were prevalent, with junta members and political elites favoring family and friends in business deals and government appointments.

The Uranium scandal saw junta members embezzle funds meant for uranium development, siphoning off millions of dollars. In the Fuel gate scandal, military officials embezzled funds meant for fuel imports, causing widespread shortages and price hikes. The Food aid scandal involved junta members diverting international food aid to sell on the black market, exacerbating hunger and poverty. The Weapon procurement scandal saw the junta embezzle funds meant for weapon purchases, leaving the military ill-equipped. The corruption and impunity of the junta and political elites exacerbated Niger's political and economic instability, perpetuating a culture of corruption and undermining the rule of law.

=== Current era (2011–present) ===
While President Mahamadou Issoufou has made efforts to tackle corruption, it remains a significant challenge. Key corruption scandals in Niger include the Uranium Gate scandal, Petromiangate scandal, Sonatrach scandal, and Imouraren uranium mine corruption allegations.

Efforts to combat corruption in Niger include the establishment of the National Commission for the Fight against Corruption, adoption of the United Nations Convention against Corruption, and implementation of the African Union's Convention on Preventing and Combating Corruption.

President Mahamadou Issoufou's government has been marred by corruption scandals, including the Patrocinated scandal in 2011, where officials embezzled funds meant for fuel imports, causing widespread shortages and price hikes.

In 2012, Issoufou's close associates embezzled funds meant for a state-owned mining company, known as the Sonichar scandal. The Nigerien Uranium scandal in 2013 saw officials embezzle funds meant for uranium development, siphoning off millions of dollars.

In 2015, Nigerien officials embezzled funds meant for development projects, leading to the country's suspension from the African Development Bank. Most recently, the COVID-19 funds scandal in 2020 saw officials embezzle funds meant for pandemic response efforts.

== Anti-corruption initiatives ==
Anti-corruption initiatives in Niger have evolved over the years, with various efforts aimed at tackling corruption and promoting transparency. Here are some key initiatives:

=== Early years (1960s-1980s) ===
Niger's first president, Hamani Diori, established the Commission for the Repression of Embezzlement and Misappropriation of Public Funds.

=== 1990-1999 ===
The Nigerien government established the Ministry of Justice and Human Rights, which included a department dedicated to combating corruption.

=== 2000s ===
Niger adopted the United Nations Convention against Corruption (UNCAC) and established the National Commission for the Fight against Corruption (CNLC).

=== 2010s ===
The CNLC was replaced by the High Authority for the Fight against Corruption and Asset Recovery (HALCIA), which has more powers and independence.

=== 2011 ===
President Mahamadou Issoufou launched the "Nigeriens Debout" (Nigerians Stand Up) initiative, aimed at promoting good governance and fighting corruption.

=== 2015 ===
Niger adopted the African Union's Convention on Preventing and Combating Corruption.

=== 2018 ===
HALCIA launched the "National Strategy for the Fight against Corruption" (SNLC), a comprehensive plan to tackle corruption.

=== 2020 ===
Niger established the "Asset Recovery Office" to manage and recover stolen assets.

== Money laundering laws ==
Niger's money laundering laws aim to prevent and combat money laundering and terrorist financing. The country has enacted several laws and regulations to comply with international standards, including the Law on Prevention and Repression of Money Laundering and Terrorist Financing. This law criminalizes money laundering and terrorist financing and requires financial institutions to report suspicious transactions.

The Financial Intelligence Unit (FIU) was established to receive and analyze these reports, and to investigate and prosecute money laundering and terrorist financing cases. The FIU also works with foreign financial intelligence units to trace and recover illicit funds.

The High Authority for the Fight against Corruption and Asset Recovery (HALCIA) is responsible for investigating and prosecuting corruption cases, including embezzlement, bribery, and misappropriation of public funds. HALCIA also works to recover stolen assets and to implement sanctions against individuals and companies found guilty of corruption. The National Commission for the Fight against Corruption (CNLC) is a separate agency that works to prevent corruption and promote good governance. The CNLC provides training and capacity building for public officials and works to raise awareness about the dangers of corruption.

The Ministry of Justice and Human Rights is responsible for prosecuting corruption and money laundering cases, and for providing legal guidance to other agencies. The Ministry of Finance works to prevent money laundering and terrorist financing by implementing regulations and oversight for financial institutions.

Political changes in Niger have had a significant impact on the country's anti-corruption efforts. President Mahamadou Issoufou's "Nigeriens Debout" initiative aimed to promote good governance and fight corruption. The establishment of HALCIA and the FIU demonstrated the government's commitment to combating corruption and money laundering.

Niger's membership in the African Union's Convention on Preventing and Combating Corruption also shows the country's dedication to regional and international cooperation in the fight against corruption. The National Strategy for the Fight against Corruption provides a roadmap for the country's anti-corruption efforts, and includes measures to improve transparency, accountability, and public participation.

== Political change ==
Political changes in Niger have had a significant impact on the country's corruption landscape. President Mahamadou Issoufou's "Nigeriens Debout" initiative aimed to promote good governance and fight corruption, but critics argue it was more rhetoric than action.

The establishment of HALCIA and FIU demonstrated a commitment to combating corruption, but their effectiveness has been hindered by lack of resources and political interference. Changes in government leadership have led to shifts in corruption patterns, with new officials often accused of embezzlement and nepotism. Political instability and coups have created power vacuums, allowing corruption to flourish. International pressure and sanctions, such as the EU's 2019 sanctions on Nigerien officials, have pushed the government to take action against corruption, but progress is slow. Civil society and media scrutiny have increased, exposing corruption scandals and pushing for accountability. However, political will to combat corruption remains inconsistent, with some leaders prioritizing personal interests over reform.

== International ranking ==
In Transparency International's 2025 Corruption Perceptions Index, Niger scored 31 on a scale from 0 ("highly corrupt") to 100 ("very clean"). When ranked by score, Niger ranked 124th among the 182 countries in the Index, where the country ranked first is perceived to have the most honest public sector. For comparison with regional scores, the best score among sub-Saharan African countries (Note: Angola, Benin, Botswana, Burkina Faso, Burundi, Cameroon, Cape Verde, Central African Republic, Chad, Comoros, Côte d'Ivoire, Democratic Republic of the Congo, Djibouti, Equatorial Guinea, Eritrea, Eswatini, Ethiopia, Gabon, Gambia, Ghana, Guinea, Guinea-Bissau, Kenya, Lesotho, Liberia, Madagascar, Malawi, Mali, Mauritania, Mauritius, Mozambique, Namibia, Niger, Nigeria, Republic of the Congo, Rwanda, Sao Tome and Principe, Senegal, Seychelles, Sierra Leone, Somalia, South Africa, South Sudan, Sudan, Tanzania, Togo, Uganda, Zambia, and Zimbabwe.) was 68, the average was 32 and the worst was 9. For comparison with worldwide scores, the best score was 89 (ranked 1), the average was 42, and the worst was 9 (ranked 181, in a two-way tie).

== Media, civil society and resistance ==
Media, civil society, and resistance in Niger have played a crucial role in exposing and combating corruption, despite facing challenges and intimidation.

=== Media ===
Investigative journalism has uncovered corruption scandals, such as embezzlement and nepotism, involving high-ranking officials. Media outlets have reported on corruption in the mining sector, including bribery and illegal mining. Journalists have faced harassment, arrest, and intimidation for their reporting on corruption.

=== Civil Society ===
Organizations such as the Nigerien Association for the Defense of Human Rights (ANDDH) and the Nigerien Coalition for the Fight against Corruption (CNLC) have been vocal in their criticism of corruption. Civil society groups have organized protests and demonstrations against corruption and impunity. They have also conducted investigations and published reports on corruption in various sectors.

=== Resistance ===
Whistleblowers have come forward to expose corruption in the government and private sector. Anti-corruption activists have faced intimidation and harassment but continue to push for accountability. Online movements and social media campaigns have been launched to raise awareness about corruption and demand action from the government.

=== Challenges ===
Media and civil society face restrictions and intimidation, including laws that criminalize defamation and whistleblowing. Corruption is often used to silence critics, with bribes or other forms of corruption used to buy their silence. The government has been slow to implement reforms and take action against corruption, despite promises to do so.

== See also ==
- Ibrahim Chaibou, a former FIFA international referee who was banned for life from any football activity over the rigging of numerous international exhibition games that involved betting and match-fixing by Chaibou under the auspices of Singaporean businessmen Dan Tan and Wilson Raj Perumal.
