= Rally for Democracy and Progress (Niger) =

Political party in Niger

Rally for Democracy and Progress Rassemblement pour la démocratie et le progrès
- Leader: Hamid Algabid
- General Secretary: Sani Abdourahmane
- Founded: 20 August 1997
- Dissolved: 27 July 2023 (work suspensed); 26 March 2025
- Preceded by: UNIRD
- Succeeded by: Social Democratic Party (faction)
- Ideology: Progressive conservatism Francophilia; Conservative islamism Pro-Privatization; Pro-Ibrahim Baré Maïnassara (1997–1999); Faction: Social democracy (Mohamed Ben Omar faction)
- Political position: Centre-right; Faction: Centre-left

The Rally for Democracy and Progress (French: Rassemblement pour la démocratie et le progrès, RDP-Jama'a) was a political party in Niger, led by Hamid Algabid. It was established as the ruling party during the presidency of Ibrahim Baré Maïnassara.

== History ==
The National Union of Independents for Democratic Renewal (UNIRD) was established in 1996 to support Maïnassara in that year's presidential elections. UNIRD went on to win the parliamentary elections later in the year. However, the following year it was dissolved and replaced by the RDP-Jama'a. At the RDP's national congress, Hamid Algabid was elected leader of the RDP-Jama'a on 20 August 1997.

After Maïnassara was assassinated in a coup in April 1999, a new transitional military regime held elections late in the year. One faction of the RDP chose Algabid as its candidate for the presidential election, while another backed party vice-chairman Amadou Cissé. The dispute went to the Court of State, which accepted Algabid's candidacy. The dispute led to the Cissé faction breaking away to form the Union for Democracy and the Republic. In the elections, Algabid finished fourth out of seven candidates in the first round with 10.83% of the vote. He backed Mahamadou Issoufou of the Nigerien Party for Democracy and Socialism (PNDS) in the second round. However, some in the RPD disagreed with this decision and backed Mamadou Tandja of the National Movement for the Development of Society (MNSD) instead. Tandja won the second round against Issoufou. In the 1999 parliamentary election, the RDP won eight seats in the National Assembly, and following the election, it sat on the opposition benches along with the PNDS.

Algabid was re-elected President of the RDP for another three-year term at a party congress on 23 January 2001, although a dissident faction, led by Idi Ango Omar, opposed Algabid's nomination of executive members of the party. Following his re-election, Algabid said that the party's "immediate objective" was "to secure the opening of an international commission of inquiry into the assassination of president Mainassara". In the National Assembly, the RDP proposed that the amnesty for participants in both the 1996 and 1999 coups be lifted, but the proposal was rejected by a large majority of deputies on 21 April 2001. Along with other opposition parties, the RPD was part of a demonstration by about 3,000 people in Niamey on 7 April 2002, shortly before the anniversary of the assassination, demanding an international inquiry.

In the 2004 general election Algabid was the RDP's presidential candidate again, finishing last in a field of six candidates with 5% of the vote. The RDP then backed incumbent President Mamadou Tandja in the second round. In the concurrent parliamentary election the party received 6.5% of the vote, winning six of the 113 seats. Five years later, in the 2009 parliamentary election, it won seven seats.

The party did not nominate a presidential candidate for the 2011 general election, but retained its seven seats in the National Assembly. The 2016 election saw it reduced to three seats, with the party again not contesting the presidential election.
