= Union of Democratic and Progressive Patriots =

Political party in Niger

The Union of Democratic and Progressive Patriots (French: Union des patriotes démocrates et progressistes, UPDP-Chamoua) is a centrist political party in Niger, founded and led by André Salifou, who has run for president on several occasions. The party held seats in the National Assembly between 1993 and 1999.

== History ==
The party was established on 11 December 1990. It received 3% of the vote in the 1993 parliamentary elections, winning two seats. Although Salifou had been provisional head of state during the transition to democratic rule in 1991. Since Salifou's position barred him from standing in the 1993 presidential elections, the party nominated Illa Kané as its candidate; he finished fifth in the eight-candidate field with 3% of the vote. Following the elections the UPDP went into opposition until 1995.

In the 1995 parliamentary elections, the party was reduced to a single seat, with Salifou elected in Zinder. Following the 1996 coup, the party did not participate in the 1996 presidential elections, but did contest the parliamentary elections later in the year. Due to a boycott by the main opposition, the party won four seats, its best-ever result.

In the 1999 general elections that followed another coup, Salifou ran for president again, finishing sixth out of seven candidates with 2% of the vote. It fared worse in the parliamentary elections, where the party's vote share was only 0.6%, resulting in it losing all four seats. The party did not nominate a presidential candidate in the 2004 general elections, and remained seatless after receiving only 0.2% of the vote in the parliamentary elections. However, Salifou was given a role in Tandja Mamadou's government.

The 2009 parliamentary elections saw the party's vote share fall to just 0.04%. It did not contest the 2011 or 2016 general elections.
