= Clémence Aïssa Baré =

Nigerien physician

First Lady of Niger
- In office January 27, 1996 – April 9, 1999
- President: Ibrahim Baré Maïnassara
- Preceded by: Nana Mariama Ibrahim Adjia
- Succeeded by: Hadjia Laraba Tandja

Personal details
- Born: c. 1959
- Spouse: Ibrahim Baré Maïnassara (died 1999)
- Children: Three

Clémence Aïssa Baré (born c. 1959) is a Nigerien physician specializing in parasitology and HIV/AIDS and former First Lady of Niger from 1996 to 1999 during the tenure of her husband, president and military ruler Ibrahim Baré Maïnassara. Since 1999, Baré and her children have campaigned for the prosecution of those responsible for the assassination of her husband during the 1999 Nigerien coup d'état. She was named Nigérien ambassador to the United States on September 4, 2025.

== Biography ==
Clémence Aïssa Baré, a physician, specializes in parasitology and HIV/AIDS treatments. She was the chief physician of a private medical clinic in Niger and a former academic and lecturer at the Faculty of Medicine of Niamey. Baré was married to Ibrahim Baré Maïnassara, a Nigerien military officer, with whom she had three children.

In 1996, Ibrahim Baré Maïnassara and other military officers overthrew President Mahamane Ousmane, Niger's first democratically elected president. Following the coup, Mainassara ruled Niger from 1996 to 1999, with his wife, Clémence Aïssa Baré, assuming the role of the country's first lady. Her tenure as first lady came to an end when her husband was murdered under mysterious circumstances during the 1999 Nigerien coup d'état on 9 April 1999.

Clémence Aïssa Baré fled Niger with her children following Maïnassara's murder and the 1999 coup. The family lived in Paris and Geneva, before settling in Dakar, Senegal, by the early 2010s. In interviews, Baré has declined to call herself an exile, saying rather that "unfortunate circumstances simply led me to make other professional and family choices at a certain point in my life."

A new constitution adopted following the July 1999 referendum provided amnesty for participants in both the 1996 Nigerien coup d'état and the 1999 coup that killed President Maïnassara . An investigation into Maïnassara's death was launched in June 1999, but following the implementation of amnesty the investigation was ended in September 1999.

Since 1999, former First Lady Clémence Aïssa Baré and her children have campaigned for the prosecution of those individuals responsible for her husband's murder. Successive Nigerien governments have declined to arrest or prosecute anyone suspected of Maïnassara's murder, citing the 1999 blanket immunity for "perpetrators, co-perpetrators and accomplices" connected to the 1999 coup d'état. A request to repeal the amnesty law was rejected by the National Assembly in April 2015.

Baré and other families affected by the 1999 coup filed several legal applications and suits in Niger, but received no restitution. She turned to the ECOWAS Court in Abuja, citing a similar investigation into the October 1987 assassination of President Thomas Sankara in neighboring Burkina Faso. In October 2015, the ECOWAS Court ordered the Nigerien government to pay 435 million CFA francs in compensation to Clémence Aïssa Baré and her family for the murder of President Ibrahim Baré Maïnassara and violating the late president's right to life.
