= Union for Democracy and the Republic (Niger) =

Political party in Niger

The Union for Democracy and the Republic (French: Union pour la démocratie et la République-Tabbat, UDR-Tabbat) is a political party in Niger. Its founding leaders were former Prime Minister Amadou Cissé and Amadou Madougou.

== History ==
The party was formed by Cissé on September 12, 1999, after a split with the Rally for Democracy and Progress (RDP-Jama'a) party. Cissé had been Prime Minister of Niger under former coup leader Ibrahim Baré Maïnassara, who formed the RDP in 1997. Following Maïnassara's assassination in April 1999, Cissé and RDP party president Hamid Algabid vied for the party's presidential nomination for the 1999 general elections. Algabid and his supporters won, and Cissé was expelled from the RDP. A faction of the RDP persisted in supporting Cissé, leaving it to the Court of State to judge which faction would remain in the RDP. The Court accepted Algabid's candidacy and rejected Cissé's candidacy on September 3. On September 12, Cissé founded the UDR-Tabbat, taking a number of supporters with him.

Although Cissé did not run in the presidential elections, the party did contest the parliamentary elections, receiving 2% of the vote, but failing to win a seat. The party contested the 2004 general elections as part of the Coordination of Democratic Forces (CFD) alliance with the main opposition party, the Nigerien Party for Democracy and Socialism (PNDS) and nine other parties, including the Nigerien Progressive Party – African Democratic Rally, the Nigerien Self-Management Party and the Union of Independent Nigeriens (UNI). A joint list of the PNDS, UNI and UDR won two seats in the National Assembly.

After boycotting the 2009 parliamentary elections, Cissé and the UDR-Tabbat were prominent among the opposition coalition to President Tandja Mamadou's Sixth Republic of 2009–10. Following the 2010 coup, the party contested the 2011 general elections; Cissé finished eighth out of ten candidates in the presidential elections with 1.6% of the vote, but the party received 5.4% of the vote in the National Assembly elections, winning six seats. Cissé ran for the presidency again in the 2016 elections, this time finishing ninth out of 15 candidates with 1.5% of the vote, whilst the party's parliamentary representation was reduced to two seats in the National Assembly after its vote share fell to 2.2%.
