= Amadou Ali Djibo =

Nigerien politician

Amadou Ali Djibo dit Max is a Nigerien politician. He leads the Union of Independent Nigeriens (UNI) and was a minor candidate in the 1999 presidential election. He was a Deputy in the National Assembly of Niger from 2009 to 2010 and again since 2011.

== Political career ==
Early in his political career, Djibo was a member of the National Movement for the Development of Society (MNSD) and served as the party's treasurer. He left that position due to a dispute and then worked as an accountant. After Ibrahim Baré Maïnassara seized power in the January 1996 coup d'état, Djibo played a key role in the committee formed to support Maïnassara's candidacy for the July 1996 presidential election and he subsequently headed Maïnassara's campaign for that election. Maïnassara won the election and then appointed Djibo as Director-General of the Nigerien Petroleum Company (Société nigérienne des pétroles, SONIDEP).

Immediately prior to the February 1999 local elections, Djibo and some others founded the UNI; its performance in those elections was considered respectable. Maïnassara was killed during an April 1999 coup d'etat and a transitional junta planned new elections for later that year. The UNI was then transformed into a political party in July 1999. At the UNI's constitutive congress on 26 August 1999, Djibo was designated as the party's candidate for the October 1999 presidential election. In the first round of that election, he placed seventh (and last) with 1.73% of the vote; subsequently, on 6 November 1999, he endorsed the candidacy of Mahamadou Issoufou for the second round of the election. Issoufou was, however, defeated by Mamadou Tandja.

In the 2004 local elections, Djibo was elected as a municipal councillor in Kirtachi; he was subsequently elected as Mayor of Kirtachi.

=== 2009 events ===
Following the August 2009 constitutional referendum, which removed presidential term limits and was boycotted by the main opposition parties, Prime Minister Seyni Oumarou visited different parts of the country to thank those who had contributed to the success of the referendum. At the ceremony for Oumarou's visit in Dosso, Djibo was present and welcomed the creation of the Sixth Republic as a result of the referendum.

Djibo was a candidate in the October 2009 parliamentary election, which was also boycotted by the major opposition parties, and was elected to the National Assembly. He was the only UNI candidate to win a seat.

In mid-November 2009, when the National Assembly began meeting for the new parliamentary term, Djibo was chosen as one of nine members of an ad hoc technical committee tasked with formulating new rules of procedure for the National Assembly. New rules of procedure were deemed necessary because a new constitution had been promulgated since the previous parliamentary term. When the permanent commissions of the National Assembly were established in late November 2009, Djibo became Rapporteur-General of the Finance Commission.

On 18 February 2010, President Tandja was ousted in a military coup and the National Assembly was promptly dissolved. The transitional junta then held a new parliamentary election in January 2011, and Djibo was again elected to the National Assembly; he was the only UNI candidate to win a seat.
