= Nigerien Party for Democracy and Socialism =

Political party in Niger

Nigerien Party for Democracy and Socialism-Tarayya Parti nigérien pour la démocratie et le socialisme-Tarayya
- Leader: Mohamed Bazoum
- President: Foumakoye Gado
- Secretary-General: Hassoumi Massaoudou
- Spokesperson: Iro Sani
- Founder: Mahamadou Issoufou
- Founded: 23 December 1990 (35 years, 253 days)
- Banned: 27 July 2023 (3 years, 37 days) (de facto) 26 March 2025 (1 year, 160 days) (de jure)
- Headquarters: 613 Avenue de l’OUA, BP 10894, Niamey
- Youth wing: OJT (Organisation des Jeunes Tarayya)
- Ideology: Democratic socialism Social democracy
- Political position: Centre-left
- International affiliation: Progressive Alliance; Socialist International (since 1996)

The Nigerien Party for Democracy and Socialism (French: Parti nigérien pour la démocratie et le socialisme, PNDS-Tarayya) was a political party in Niger. It is a banned left-leaning party, part of the Socialist International; it came to power in 2011 following the election of the former long-time leader Mahamadou Issoufou. Mohamed Bazoum is the former president of the party and the former Secretary-General is Foumakoye Gado.

"Tarayya" means "gathering" in the Hausa language.

== History ==
=== Third Republic ===
Established on December 23, 1990, the party won 13 of the 83 seats in the National Assembly in the February 1993 parliamentary elections, five of which were won in Issoufou's home department of Tahoua Department. In the presidential elections that followed, the first-multi-party election for the presidency, PNDS leader Mahamadou Issoufou, finished in third place with 15.92% of the vote in the first round. As part of a coalition called the Alliance of the Forces of Change, the PNDS backed Mahamane Ousmane of the Democratic and Social Convention (CDS) in the second round, with Ousmane defeating Mamadou Tandja of the National Movement for the Development of Society (MNSD). In the National Assembly, the PNDS formed part of the AFC majority, and Issoufou was appointed prime minister.

In a decree issued on 21 September 1994, Ousmane strengthened his powers at the expense of those of the Prime Minister, and Issoufou resigned on 28 September. The PNDS was unwilling to put forward another candidate to take Issoufou's place and withdrew from the AFC, thereby depriving the AFC of its parliamentary majority. The PNDS then formed an alliance with the opposition MNSD despite its history of hostility toward that party; Adji Kirgam and Mazou Ibrahim, two PNDS leaders who opposed this alliance, were expelled from the party.

The loss of the AFC's majority led to an early parliamentary elections in January 1995, which saw the PNDS win 12 seats and the MNSD–PNDS alliance, together with two minor groups, gained a majority of seats in the National Assembly. Hama Amadou of the MNSD became prime minister while Issoufou became president of the National Assembly. This situation involved cohabitation between the new government and President Ousmane, and intense rivalry developed between them. In January 1996, the military under Ibrahim Bare Mainassara seized power in a coup.

=== Military rule and Fourth Republic ===
In the July 1996 presidential elections, won by Mainassara in the first round, the PNDS candidate Issoufou officially finished in fourth place with 7.60% of the vote. Along with other opposition parties, grouped together as the Front for the Restoration and Defense of Democracy, the PNDS boycotted the November 1996 parliamentary elections.

=== Fifth Republic ===
Following another coup in April 1999, Issoufou finished second in the first round of the presidential contest in the general elections held later in the year, receiving 22.79% of the vote. In the second round he received 40.11% of the vote and was defeated by Mamadou Tandja. In the parliamentary elections, the PNDS won 16 of the 83 seats in the National Assembly, becoming the largest opposition party.

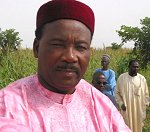
Mahamadou Issoufou speaking to the press during his 2004 election campaign.

In the 2004 general elections, Issoufou was the party's presidential candidate again. He finished second in the first round of voting with 24.6% of the vote and was defeated again by Tandja in the second round. In the parliamentary elections, the PNDS received 13.4% of the vote and won 17 of the 113 seats; eight additional seats were won by alliances of the PNDS with the Nigerien Progressive Party – African Democratic Rally, the Nigerien Self-Management Party, the Union of Independent Nigeriens and the Union for Democracy and the Republic.

=== Sixth Republic ===
The party boycotted the 2009 parliamentary elections.

=== Seventh Republic ===
The party did contest the 2011 general elections, with Issoufou elected president in the second round, defeating Seyni Oumarou of the MNSD, whilst it emerged as the largest party in the National Assembly, winning 34 of the 113 seats. Issoufou was re-elected in the 2016 general elections amidst a second-round boycott by his opponent Hama Amadou. The PNDS retained its status as the largest party in the National Assembly, winning 75 seats in an expanded 171-seat body.

=== 2023 coup ===
During the 2023 Nigerien coup d'état, which saw the overthrow of party leader Mohamed Bazoum as President of Niger, supporters of the coup demonstrated outside the party's headquarters before ransacking and burning the premises. The coup led to the 2023–2024 Nigerien crisis; the party supports the reinstatement of Bazoum as president.

== Electoral history ==
=== Presidential elections ===
Election	Party candidate	Votes	%	Votes	%	Result
Election	Party candidate	First Round		Second Round		Result
1993	Mahamadou Issoufou	205,707	15.92%	–	–	Lost ✗
1996	Mahamadou Issoufou	183,826	7.60%	-	-	Lost ✗
1999	Mahamadou Issoufou	435,041	22.79%	710,923	40.11%	Lost ✗
2004	Mahamadou Issoufou	599,792	24.60%	794,357	34.47%	Lost ✗
2011	Mahamadou Issoufou	1,192,945	36.16%	1,797,382	58.04%	Elected ✓
2016	Mahamadou Issoufou	2,252,016	48.43%	4,105,499	92.49%	Elected ✓
2020–21	Mohamed Bazoum	1,879,629	39.30%	2,490,049	55.67%	Elected ✓

=== National Assembly elections ===
Election	Party leader	Votes	%	Seats	+/–	Position
1993	Mahamadou Issoufou	183,150	14.62%	13 / 83	▲13	▲4th
1995	Mahamadou Issoufou	203,629	14.08%	12 / 83	▼1	▲3rd
1996	Mahamadou Issoufou	Boycotted		0 / 83	▼12	
1999	Mahamadou Issoufou	378,634	21.47%	16 / 83	▲16	▲3rd
2004	Mahamadou Issoufou	314,810	13.76%	17 / 83	▲1	3rd
2009	Mahamadou Issoufou	Boycotted		0 / 83	▼17	
2011	Mahamadou Issoufou	1,066,011	33.00%	34 / 113	▲34	▲1st
2016	Mahamadou Issoufou	1,701,372	35.73%	75 / 171	▲41	1st
2020	Mohamed Bazoum	1,745,266	37.04%	79 / 166	▲4	1st
