= Sani Issoufou Mahamadou =

Nigerian politician

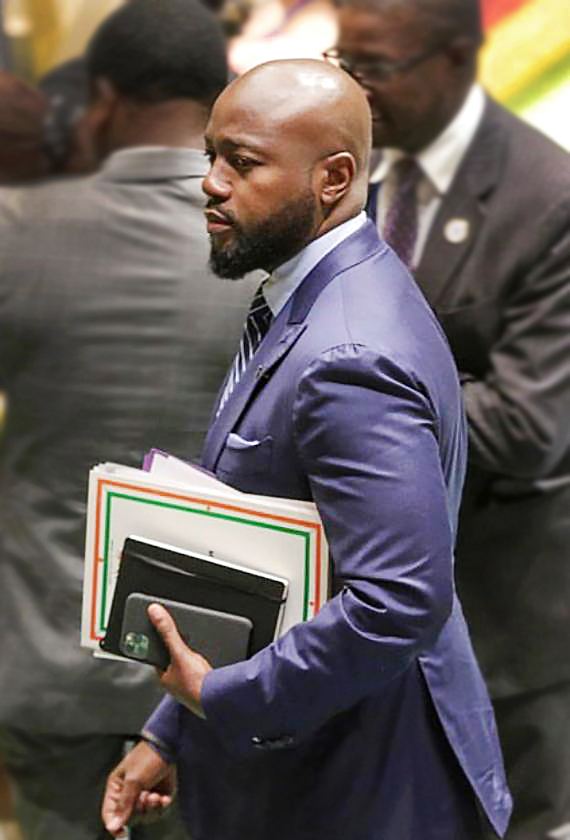

Minister of Petroleum, Energy and Renewable Energies
- In office April 2021 – July 2023
- President: Mohamed Bazoum
- Prime Minister: Ouhoumoudou Mahamadou

Personal details
- Born: April 1983 (age 43) Niamey, Niger
- Party: Nigerien Party for Democracy and Socialism
- Education: Purdue University (BS); University of Birmingham (MA); Harvard Kennedy School (MPA)

Sani Issoufou Mahamadou is a Nigerian politician who served in the government of Niger as Minister of Petroleum, Energy and Renewable Energies from April 2021 to July 2023 under President Mohamed Bazoum, until the 2023 Nigerien coup d'état. He was the son of Mahamadou Issoufou, who was the President of Niger from 2011 to 2021. Prior to being a minister, in 2018, he was promoted to the position of Deputy Chief of Staff to the President of the Republic. He also became a member of the National Executive Committee of the PNDS - Tarayya, where he served as Secretary in charge of youth entrepreneurship.
