= 1996 Nigerien constitutional referendum =

A constitutional referendum was held in Niger on 12 May 1996. The new constitution would restore multi-party democracy after the military coup earlier in the year had ousted elected President Mahamane Ousmane.

It was approved by 92.34% of voters with a turnout of only around 35%. The first presidential elections under the new constitution were held on 7 and 8 July, and saw a victory for coup leader Ibrahim Baré Maïnassara.

== Results ==
| Choice | Votes | % |
|---|---|---|
| For | | 92.34 |
| Against | | 7.66 |
| Total | | 100 |
| Registered voters/turnout | | 35.10 |
Source: Direct Democracy
