= 1999 Nigerien general election =

- Presidential election
- 17 October 1999 (first round); 24 November 1999 (second round)
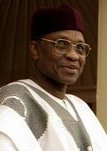

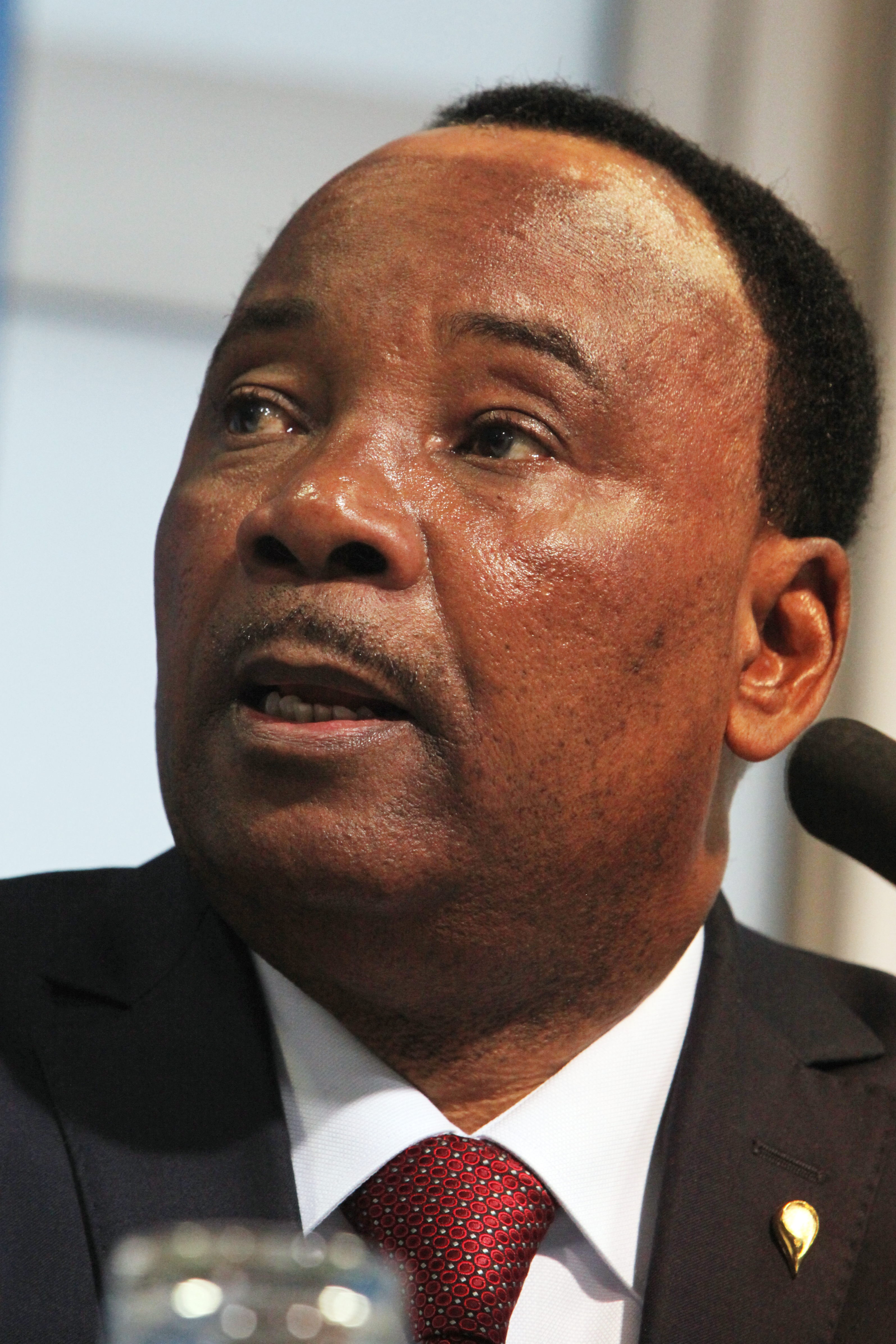
Nominee	Mamadou Tandja	Mahamadou Issoufou
Party	MNSD	PNDS
Popular vote	1,061,731	710,923
Percentage	59.89%	40.11%
President before election
Daouda Malam Wanké
Military
Elected President
Mamadou Tandja
MNSD
- Parliamentary election
- All 83 seats in the National Assembly; 42 seats needed for a majority
Party	Vote %	Seats	+/–
MNSD	34.65	38	New
CDS-Rahama	17.23	17	New
PNDS	21.47	16	New
RDP-Jama'a	10.95	8	New
ANDP-Zaman Lahiya	6.61	4	−4
This lists parties that won seats. See the complete results below.
President of the National Assembly before	President of the National Assembly after
Moutari Moussa; Independent	Mahamane Ousmane; CDS-Rahama

General elections were held in Niger in 1999; the first-round of the presidential elections was held on 17 October, with a run-off held alongside National Assembly elections on 24 November. The elections followed a coup d'état on 9 April, in which Ibrahim Baré Maïnassara, who had led an earlier coup in January 1996 and won disputed presidential elections, was assassinated. Coup leader Daouda Mallam Wanké initiated a transitional period that concluded with the victory of Mamadou Tandja, the candidate of the National Movement for the Society of Development (MNSD), over Mahamadou Issoufou, the candidate of the Nigerien Party for Democracy and Socialism (PNDS), in the run-off. The vote for the first National Assembly of the Fifth Republic, which had originally been scheduled for October, but delayed in August, also saw a victory for the MNSD, which won 38 of the 83 seats. It formed a coalition with the Democratic and Social Convention in order to gain a majority in the Assembly.

== Background ==
Following the April 1999 coup, Wanké called for new presidential and parliamentary elections late in the year and barred the participation of candidates from the military. The elections were overseen and organised by a sixty-member Independent National Election Commission, appointed by the military government with representatives from political parties and civil society groups on 27 May 1999.

A new constitution was approved by a referendum held on 18 July 1999 and promulgated 8 August. The elections were originally scheduled for 7 October 1999 but were delayed in August 1999.

== Presidential candidates ==
Eight candidates sought to run in the presidential elections, including two rival candidates from the Rally for Democracy and Progress-Jama'a (RDP), which had been the ruling party under Maïnassara; Hamid Algabid and Amadou Cissé. It was left to the Court of State to decide which of these two candidates could run. On 3 September the Court released its list of approved candidates; seven were approved, including Algabid, while Cissé's candidacy was rejected.

Candidates eliminated in the first round sought to influence the outcome of the second round by endorsing one of the two remaining candidates; Djermakoye announced his support for Issoufou on 4 November, Ousmane announced his support for Tandja on 5 November, and Algabid and Djibo announced their support for Issoufou on 6 November (although some members of the RDP objected to Algabid's support for Issoufou and backed Tandja instead on 7 November).

== Results ==
=== President ===
Candidate	Party	First round		Second round	
Candidate	Party	Votes	%	Votes	%
Mamadou Tandja	National Movement for the Society of Development	617,320	32.33	1,061,731	59.89
Mahamadou Issoufou	Nigerien Party for Democracy and Socialism	435,041	22.79	710,923	40.11
Mahamane Ousmane	Democratic and Social Convention	429,827	22.51		
Hamid Algabid	Rally for Democracy and Progress	206,763	10.83		
Moumouni Adamou Djermakoye	Nigerien Alliance for Democracy and Progress	147,672	7.73		
André Salifou	Union of Democratic and Progressive Patriots	39,641	2.08		
Amadou Ali Djibo	Union of Independent Nigeriens	32,977	1.73		
Total		1,909,241	100.00	1,772,654	100.00
Valid votes		1,909,241	95.92	1,772,654	97.64
Invalid/blank votes		81,129	4.08	42,757	2.36
Total votes		1,990,370	100.00	1,815,411	100.00
Registered voters/turnout		4,560,508	43.64	4,608,090	39.40
Source: African Elections Database

=== National Assembly ===
Party	Votes	%	Seats	+/–
National Movement for the Society of Development	611,097	34.65	38	New
Democratic and Social Convention	303,790	17.23	17	New
Nigerien Party for Democracy and Socialism	378,634	21.47	16	New
Rally for Democracy and Progress	193,080	10.95	8	New
Nigerien Alliance for Democracy and Progress	116,610	6.61	4	–4
Union for Democracy and the Republic	34,128	1.94	0	–
Union of Independent Nigeriens	22,081	1.25	0	–
Union for Democracy and Social Progress	20,332	1.15	0	–3
Nigerien Self-Management Party	16,191	0.92	0	–
Nigerien Progressive Party – African Democratic Rally	10,912	0.62	0	–
Union of Democratic and Progressive Patriots	10,863	0.62	0	–4
Sawaba	10,709	0.61	0	–
Union of Democratic Independents	7,239	0.41	0	–
PSDN–MDP	5,126	0.29	0	–
PPN-RDA-ORND	4,598	0.26	0	–
PPN-RDA–UDPS	4,536	0.26	0	–
Party for Socialism and Democracy in Niger	3,037	0.17	0	–
Party for People's Dignity	2,297	0.13	0	–3
Revolutionary Organisation for the New Democracy	778	0.04	0	–
PPN-RDA–UDPS–ORND	437	0.02	0	–
Party of the Masses for Labour	34	0.00	0	–2
Independents	7,044	0.40	0	–3
Total	1,763,553	100.00	83	0
Source: Global Elections Database

== Aftermath ==
The new government was seated on 1 January 2000 and operated under the Constitution of 1999.
