= Foumakoye Gado =

Nigerien politician

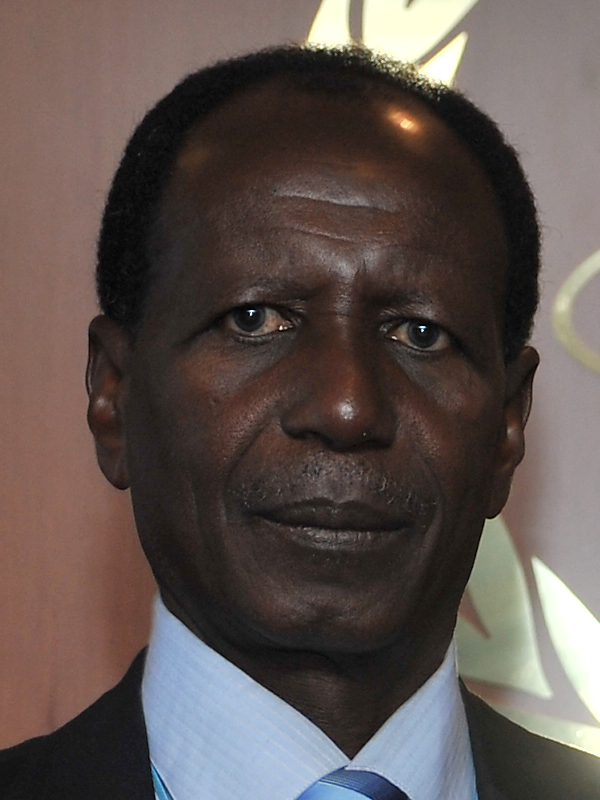
Foumakoye Gado in 2011

Foumakoye Gado (born 1950) is a Nigerien politician who is currently the President of the Nigerien Party for Democracy and Socialism (PNDS-Tarayya). He served in the government of Niger as Minister of Mines and Energy from April 1993 to October 1994, and held the same post for a second time from April 2011 to September 2011. He has served as Minister of Oil since September 2011, with responsibility for energy as well until October 2016.

== Political career ==
Gado studied physics at the University of Niamey and received a doctorate degree; later, he was a professor at the same university. He was a founding member of the PNDS-Tarayya, a political party created under the leadership of Mahamadou Issoufou in the early 1990s, and acquired a reputation as a firm loyalist of Issoufou. At the PNDS Constitutive General Assembly, held on 23–24 December 1990, he was designated as the First Deputy Secretary-General of the PNDS.

He was elected to the National Assembly of Niger in the February 1993 parliamentary election as a PNDS candidate in Dosso constituency. Following the 1993 election, Mahamadou Issoufou was appointed as Prime Minister at the head of a coalition government, and Gado was appointed to Issoufou's government as Minister of Mines and Energy on 23 April 1993. At the same time, he was also Deputy Secretary-General of the PNDS. He served as Minister of Mines and Energy until October 1994, when the PNDS withdrew from the ruling coalition and went into opposition.

Gado was among those arrested following an opposition demonstration on 11 January 1997. At the Fourth Ordinary Congress of the PNDS, held on 4–5 September 2004, Gado was elected as its Secretary-General.

In August 2005, Gado alleged that food aid was being improperly and corruptly distributed by administrative and political authorities, and he urged the government to take action against those responsible. He was re-elected as PNDS Secretary-General at the party's Fifth Ordinary Congress, held on 18 July 2009.

After Mahamadou Issoufou won the January–March 2011 presidential election and took office as president on 7 April 2011, Gado was appointed to the government as Minister of Mines and Energy on 21 April 2011. He took over the ministry from his predecessor, Djibo Salamatou Gourouza Magagi, on 23 April 2011.

President Issoufou modified the government on 12 September 2011, separating the mining portfolio from energy; he appointed Omar Hamidou Tchiana as Minister of State for Mines and Industrial Development, while Gado was instead appointed as Minister of Energy and Oil. After Issoufou was sworn in for a second term, he retained Gado in his post as Minister of Energy and Oil in the government named on 11 April 2016. His portfolio was modified on 19 October 2016, when a new minister of energy was appointed, but Gado remained Minister of Oil.

On 31 July 2023, he was reportedly arrested, following the 2023 Nigerien coup d'état. He was released on 1 April 2025.
