= 1993 Nigerien presidential election =

- 27 February 1993 (first round); 27 March 1993 (second round)

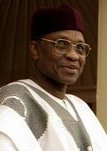
Nominee	Mahamane Ousmane	Mamadou Tandja
Party	CDS-Rahama	MNSD
Popular vote	763,476	639,418
Percentage	54.42%	45.58%
President before election
Ali Saibou
MNSD
Elected President
Mahamane Ousmane
CDS-Rahama

Presidential elections were held in Niger on 27 February 1993, with a second round on 27 March after no candidate passed the 50% barrier in the first round. They were the first multi-candidate presidential elections held in the country since independence in 1960, following constitutional changes approved in a referendum the previous year. Although Mamadou Tandja of the ruling National Movement for the Society of Development (which had emerged as the largest party in the parliamentary elections) won the most votes in the first round, he lost in the second round to Mahamane Ousmane of the Democratic and Social Convention party. Voter turnout was only 32.5% in the first round and 35.2% in the second.

== Results ==
Candidate	Party	First round		Second round	
Candidate	Party	Votes	%	Votes	%
Mamadou Tandja	National Movement for the Society of Development	443,223	34.28	639,418	45.58
Mahamane Ousmane	Democratic and Social Convention	343,261	26.55	763,476	54.42
Mahamadou Issoufou	Nigerien Party for Democracy and Socialism	205,707	15.91		
Moumouni Adamou Djermakoye	Nigerien Alliance for Democracy and Progress	196,949	15.23		
Illa Kané	Union of Democratic and Progressive Patriots	32,951	2.55		
Oumarou Garba Issoufou	Nigerien Progressive Party – African Democratic Rally	25,769	1.99		
Omar Katzelma Taya	Party for Socialism and Democracy in Niger	23,565	1.82		
Djibo Bakary	Sawaba	21,662	1.68		
Total		1,293,087	100.00	1,402,894	100.00
Valid votes		1,293,087	97.31	1,402,894	97.87
Invalid/blank votes		35,695	2.69	30,499	2.13
Total votes		1,328,782	100.00	1,433,393	100.00
Registered voters/turnout		4,082,076	32.55	4,069,333	35.22
Source: Nohlen et al.
