= Election Petition Tribunal =

Election Tribunal Court

- Established: 1999
- Location: Nigeria
- Language: English
- Type of tribunal: Election petition

Election Petition Tribunal is a Nigeria specialized judicial body/court established under the 1999 Constitution of the Federal Republic of Nigeria to hear, determine, and adjudicate legal disputes arising from the conduct of elections into public offices across the country. As Judicial institutions operating under legal timelines, election petition tribunals serve as a mechanism for resolving electoral grievances, enforcing compliance with statutory provisions, and providing formal legal recourse to political candidates and registered political parties.

== Historical background/legal framework ==
The 1999 Constitution of the Federal Republic of Nigeria (as amended): Specifically Section 285, which sets out the constitutional mandate, composition, and time limits for election tribunals.

The Electoral Act 2022: Regulates procedural matters, rules of evidence, grounds for challenging election results, and the responsibilities of the Independent National Electoral Commission (INEC).

== Judiciary structure ==
Nigeria use a structure judiciary hierarchy to address all the dispute that came after the election or the office in question.

- Presidential election petition tribunal, the presidential election petition tribunal holds the jurisdiction to hear the petition that is challenging the election of the president or the vice president. It consists of a panel of Court of Appeal Justices chosen by the Court of Appeal President.
- National and state house of assembly Election Tribunal, this tribunal holds all the petition that arises from the Senate, House of Representatives and state house of assembly Elections. The panel Consists of a Chairman (a Judge of a High court) and two other members drawn from the High Court, Customary Court of Appeal, or Sharia court of Appeal.
- Governorship election tribunal, this tribunal holds all disputes that arises from the state governorship election and the deputy governors. It consists of chairman appointed by the judicial officer.
- The area council election tribunal, this holds all the dispute that comes from the Chairman and councilorship and Local government elections, and within the federal capital territory.
