= Movement for Democracy and Progress =

The Movement for Democracy and Progress may refer to:

- Movement for Democracy and Progress (Comoros)
- Movement for Democracy and Progress (Niger)
- Movement for Democracy and Progress (Republic of the Congo)
