= 1999 Nigerien constitutional referendum =

- 18 July 1999

Results
Choice	Votes	%
Yes	1,159,632	89.57%
No	134,976	10.43%
Valid votes	1,294,608	98.18%
Invalid or blank votes	23,955	1.82%
Total votes	1,318,563	100.00%
Registered voters/turnout	4,231,296	31.16%

A constitutional referendum was held in Niger on 18 July 1999. The new constitution would restore multi-party democracy after the military coup earlier in the year had ousted (and resulted in the death of) elected President Ibrahim Baré Maïnassara.

The third constitutional referendum of the 1990s, it was approved by 90% of voters with a turnout of only around 31%. General elections for the presidency and National Assembly were held in October and November.

== Results ==
Choice	Votes	%
For	1,159,632	89.57
Against	134,976	10.43
Total	1,294,608	100.00
Valid votes	1,294,608	98.18
Invalid/blank votes	23,955	1.82
Total votes	1,318,563	100.00
Registered voters/turnout	4,231,296	31.16
Source: Direct Democracy
