= Hamid Algabid =

Nigerien politician

Secretary-General of the Organisation of Islamic Cooperation
- In office 1989–1997
- Preceded by: Syed Sharifuddin Pirzada
- Succeeded by: Azzeddine Laraki

Prime Minister of Niger
- In office 14 November 1983 – 15 July 1988
- President: Seyni Kountché; Ali Saibou
- Preceded by: Mamane Oumarou
- Succeeded by: Mamane Oumarou

Personal details
- Born: 1941 (age 84–85)
- Party: RDP-Jama'a

Hamid Algabid (born 1941) is a Nigerien politician and the President of the Rally for Democracy and Progress (RDP-Jama'a) party. A lawyer, banker, and technocrat, Algabid was an important figure in the regime of Seyni Kountché, serving as Prime Minister of Niger from 1983 to 1988. He was Secretary-General of the Organisation of the Islamic Conference (OIC) from 1989 to 1996, and since 1997 he has been President of the RDP-Jama'a. He was also President of the High Council of Territorial Collectivities (HCCT) until 2010.

== Early life and education ==
A member of the Tuareg ethnic group, Algabid was born in the small settlement of Belbedji, near Tanout in 1941. He studied law at the University of Abidjan and later at the IIAP in Paris, where he received his law degree. He was made a head of department under the Ministry of External Finance from 1971 to 1973, and he was promoted to the position of Secretary-General of Finance in 1973.

== Under the military government ==
Following the April 1974 coup d'état led by General Seyni Kountché, Algabid remained in his post as Secretary-General of Finance until 1979. During that time he also was appointed country administrator of the Economic Community of West African States (ECOWAS) Central Bank (1975–76) and then country administrator of the Islamic Development Bank (1976–79). On 10 September 1979, he was appointed to the government as Secretary of State for Foreign Affairs and Cooperation. He served in that post until he was promoted to the position of Minister of Trade on 8 February 1981; subsequently his portfolio was expanded when he was appointed Minister of Trade and Transport on 14 June 1982. Algabid was then named Deputy Minister for Finance on 24 January 1983 before being appointed Prime Minister on 14 November 1983. He served as Prime Minister until 15 July 1988.

== Second and Third Republics ==
From 1989 to 1996, Algabid was Secretary-General of the Organisation of the Islamic Conference (OIC). In December 1996, he was nominated as a candidate to become Secretary-General of the United Nations, a post which was won by Kofi Annan.

== Under Maïnassara ==
During the rule of Nigerien President Ibrahim Baré Maïnassara, Algabid returned to politics in Niger. On 20 August 1997, he was named President of the RDP-Jama'a, which was established as Maïnassara's ruling party, at the party's national congress. Later, Algabid also became head of the Convergence for the Republic (CPR), a pro-Maïnassara coalition composed of 15 parties, which was formed in August 1998.

== Fifth Republic ==
Maïnassara was assassinated in April 1999, and a military regime scheduled a new presidential election for late in the year. Algabid ran as the RDP-Jama'a candidate in this election; although Amadou Cissé, the RDP's Vice-President, also attempted to run as the RDP candidate, the Court of State approved Algabid's candidacy and rejected Cissé's candidacy on 3 September. In the first round of the election, held on 17 October, Algabid placed fourth out of seven candidates, winning 10.83% of the vote. On 6 November, Algabid announced his support for Mahamadou Issoufou, the candidate of the Nigerien Party for Democracy and Socialism, in the second round; Issoufou was defeated by Tandja Mamadou of the National Movement for the Development of Society (MNSD).

Algabid was also elected to the National Assembly in the 1999 parliamentary election, and during the parliamentary term that followed he served as Fourth Vice-President of the National Assembly as well as the Vice-President of the RDP Parliamentary Group.

Algabid was re-elected as President of the RDP for another three-year term at a party congress on January 23, 2001. On this occasion, he said that the RDP's "immediate objective" was "to secure the opening of an international commission of inquiry into the assassination of president Mainassara".

Algabid served as the African Union's special envoy for Darfur in 2004. On 11 September 2004, he was designated as the RDP candidate in the 2004 presidential election; however, he was largely absent from Niger at the time due to his role as a mediator in Sudan. In the election, held on 16 November, Algabid finished last out of six candidates with 4.89% of the vote. On 21 November, the RDP announced its support for Tandja in the second round.

Algabid was re-elected to the National Assembly in the 2004 parliamentary election. He was subsequently appointed as President of the High Council of Territorial Collectivities (HCCT), a body responsible for local government in Niger. In December 2006, he was awarded a medal by the Islamic Educational, Scientific and Cultural Organization (ISESCO).

During the 2009 constitutional crisis caused by Tandja's decision to seek a referendum on a new constitution that would enable him to remain in power, the RDP-Jama'a announced on 12 May 2009 that it would support the new constitution, which would establish a presidential system; according to Algabid, a presidential system was "best suited to promote development". However, the RDP's support was conditional: it demanded the removal of the 1999 constitution's amnesty for those involved in Maïnassara's assassination, and it demanded an investigation into the 1999 coup. On June 28, 2009, the RDP changed its position, announcing its unconditional support for the referendum despite the continued inclusion of the constitutional amnesty. The RDP was given two posts in the government, and the mandate of the HCCT, chaired by Algabid, was extended by six months. Some members of the party disapproved of the decision to support the referendum, however, and two former ministers, Abdoulrahamane Seydou and Moussa Oumarou, resigned from the RDP as a result.

The RDP participated in the October 2009 parliamentary election, but the opposition, angered by Tandja's efforts to remain in power, boycotted it. ECOWAS, which wanted the election delayed in hopes of resolving the political crisis, suspended Niger from its ranks immediately after the election was held. Algabid was included in the 22-member Nigerien delegation that traveled to Abuja for talks with ECOWAS beginning on 9 November 2009. Tandja was ousted in a February 2010 military coup; all state institutions were promptly dissolved, thereby removing Algabid from his post as President of the HCCT. Later, after Mahamadou Issoufou was elected as President, Algabid was appointed an Ambassador-at-Large on 19 October 2011.

Political offices
Preceded by Mamane Oumarou	Prime Minister of Niger; 1983 – 1988	Succeeded by Mamane Oumarou
