= Nigerien Self-Management Party =

Political party in Niger

Nigerien Self-Management Party Parti nigérien pour l'autogestion
- Leader: Sanoussi Jackou
- Founded: 2 February 1997
- Dissolved: 27 July 2023 (work suspensed); 26 March 2025
- Split from: Democratic and Social Convention
- Headquarters: Niamey
- Ideology: Conservatism

The Nigerien Self-Management Party (French: Parti nigérien pour l'autogestion, PNA-Al'ouma) was a political party in Niger led by Sanoussi Jackou. "Al'ouma", the party's nickname, is an Arabic loan word meaning "Community" in Hausa.

== History ==
The party was founded by Jackou on 2 February 1997 following his 1996 expulsion from the Democratic and Social Convention (which he had co-founded in 1991) when he chose to take up ministerial posts in the government of Ibrahim Baré Maïnassara. It received 0.9% of the vote in the 1999 parliamentary elections, failing to win a seat. It contested the 2004 parliamentary elections in alliance with the Nigerien Party for Democracy and Socialism and the Nigerien Progressive Party – African Democratic Rally, with the joint list winning four seats. Jackou took one of the seats, becoming the PNA's first elected deputy.

It retained its single seat in the 2009 parliamentary elections, but received no votes in the 2011 elections that followed a 2010 coup. In the 2016 parliamentary elections it received 0.5% of the vote, failing to win a seat.
