= Party of the Masses for Labour =

Political party in Niger

The Party of the Masses for Labour (French: Parti des masses pour le travail, PMT-Albarka) is a political party in Niger.

== History ==
The PMT was established on 8 June 1992. It failed to win a seat in the National Assembly in the 1993 or 1995 parliamentary elections, but won two seats in the 1996 elections, which were boycotted by the main opposition parties.

The party received only 34 votes in the 1999 parliamentary elections, resulting in it losing both seats. In the 2004 elections it contested three regions in alliance with the Nigerien Alliance for Democracy and Progress, but failed to win a seat. It regained parliamentary representation when it won a single seat in the 2009 elections, which were boycotted by the main opposition. However, it did not run in the 2011 elections and was declared ineligible to contest the 2016 elections by the Constitutional Court.
