= Hadiza Moussa Gros =

Nigerien politician

- Born: December 25, 1960 (age 65); Niamey, Niger
- Other name: Lady Gros
- Occupation: Politician
- Years active: 2009–present
- Known for: President of the High Court of Justice

Hadiza Moussa Gros (born 25 December 1960), also known as Lady Gros, is a Nigerien politician who has served as President of the High Court of Justice since December 2011.

== Early life and education ==
Moussa Gros was born in Niamey on 25 December 1960. She studied business administration at a private school in Lyon.

== Career ==
Moussa Gros was elected as a member of the National Assembly for the National Movement for the Development of Society. She was expelled from the party on 26 April 2009 along with four other deputies who supported Hama Amadou.

Moussa Gros was re-elected to the National Assembly representing Nigerien Democratic Movement for an African Federation in January 2011. She worked as Deputy Chair of the Economic and Planning Committee.

On 20 December 2011, Moussa Gros was appointed President of the High Court of Justice, the first woman to hold the office.
