= Party for People's Dignity =

Political party in Niger

The Party for People's Dignity (French: Parti pour la dignité du peuple, PDP-Daraja) was a political party in Niger.

== History ==
The party was established on 2 April 1995. In the 1996 parliamentary elections, which were boycotted by the eight main opposition parties, it received 1.4% of the vote, winning three of the 83 seats in the National Assembly. The 1999 elections saw its vote share reduced to just 0.1%, resulting in it losing all three seats. A similar outcome in the 2004 elections meant that the party remained without parliamentary representation.
