= National Movement for the Society of Development =

Political party in Niger

National Movement for the Society of Development-Nassara Mouvement national pour la société de développement-Nassara
- President: Seyni Oumarou
- Founder: Ali Saibou
- Founded: March 1989
- Banned: 27 July 2023 (work suspensed); 26 March 2025
- Headquarters: Niamey
- Ideology: Conservatism; Social conservatism Conservative liberalism Liberal conservatism Liberalism; Economic liberalism
- Political position: Centre-right
- Colors: Green and brown

Website
- mnsdnassara.com

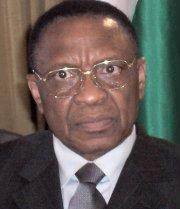
President of Niger Tandja Mamadou on a state visit to Nigeria, 2007.

The National Movement for the Society of Development, also known as the National Movement for the Development of Society (French: Mouvement national pour la société de développement, MNSD-Nassara) was a political party in Niger. Founded under the military government of the 1974–1990 period, it was the ruling party of Niger from 1989 to 1993 and again from 1999 until 2010, when a coup on 18 February 2010, by a military junta called the Supreme Council for the Restoration of Democracy (CSRD), ousted President Mamadou Tandja.

== History ==
=== 20th century ===
The MNSD was founded in 1989 by military ruler and President Ali Saibou, as the only legal party in the country. However, by the end of 1990, the Saibou regime acquiesced to union and student demands to institute a multi-party democratic system.

In 1991, two factions emerged within the MNSD, one behind Mamadou Tandja (MNSD-Nassara) and the other behind Moumouni Adamou Djermakoye, both of whom had been important figures in the regime of Seyni Kountché. At a party congress in March 1991, Saibou retained his position as President of the MNSD, but at another congress held in November 1991, Tandja was elected as MNSD President, while Hama Amadou was elected as its Secretary-General. Tandja obtaining the party leadership over Djermakoye marked a departure from the traditional dominance of the party by Djermakoye's Zarma (Djerma) ethnic group. Djermakoye split from the MNSD and formed his own party, the Nigerien Alliance for Democracy and Progress (ANDP).

Tandja was the MNSD candidate in the 1993 presidential elections and was the leading candidate in the first round of voting with 34% of the vote. However, he was defeated in the second round by the Democratic and Social Convention (CDS) candidate Mahamane Ousmane, who was backed by the Alliance of the Forces of Change (AFC), an alliance formed by the candidates who did not qualify for the second round. Although the MNSD won 29 seats in the 1993 parliamentary elections, emerging as the largest party, it went into opposition after the elections because the AFC parties held a majority of seats. However, early parliamentary elections were held in 1995, which saw the MNSD remain the largest party with 29 seats and successfully form an alliance with the Nigerien Party for Democracy and Socialism (PNDS), which had previously been hostile to the MNSD, and smaller parties. Hama Amadou of the MNSD then became prime minister, in cohabitation with President Ousmane. The cohabitation was marked by sharp rivalry between Amadou and Ousmane, and in January 1996 the military, led by Ibrahim Baré Maïnassara, seized power in a coup.

Tandja ran unsuccessfully again in the July 1996 presidential elections, finishing in third place with 15.65% of the vote, behind Maïnassara and Ousmane. Along with other opposition parties, grouped together as the Front for the Restoration and Defense of Democracy, the MNSD boycotted the November 1996 parliamentary elections.

Another coup in April 1999 led to general elections late in the year; the MNSD won the presidential election, with Tandja defeating Mahamadou Issoufou of the PNDS in the second round, taking 59.89% of the vote. The MNSD again remained the largest party in the National Assembly, winning 38 out of the 83 seats, and in alliance with the CDS, gained a parliamentary majority, resulting in Amadou becoming prime minister again. With the parliamentary support of smaller parties, the party maintained a working majority in the National Assembly. As President, Tandja had to give up his position as party leader. Hamidou Sékou acted as interim leader, until Hama Amadou, previously the party's secretary-general, was elected party president in December 2001.

=== 21st century ===
In the 2004 general elections Tandja was re-elected to the presidency in the second round, defeating Issoufou, with all the candidates knocked out in the first round backing Tandja. The MNSD won 47 of the 113 seats in an enlarged National Assembly. Amadou remained Prime Minister, but his government was defeated in a no-confidence vote on 31 May 2007, and in early June Tandja appointed Seyni Oumarou as Amadou's successor. Amadou was arrested for alleged embezzlement in June 2008. Serious tensions between supporters of Amadou, the MNSD President, and Tandja, the President of the Republic, subsequently developed, and supporters of the two sides traded accusations.

Despite a split in the party, jailed former prime minister Hama Amadou retained the Presidency of the MNSD with his supporter Habi Mahamadou Salissou as its Secretary-General. However, he was stripped of the formal leadership of the ruling party in early 2009; a special congress held in Zinder on 21 February replaced him with his successor as prime minister, Oumarou. Minister of Interior Albadé Abouba was elected as secretary general of the party. This result came despite months of wrangling between pro-Tandja and pro-Amadou elements in the party that threatened to split the MNSD and saw pro-Amadou groups join opposition protests against a floated plan to extend Tandja's term past the 2009 elections.

On 26 April 2009, the party's political bureau decided to expel eight party members, including five deputies to the National Assembly, for "indiscipline": deputies Soumana Sanda, Issaka Hassane Djégoulé, Amadou Soumana ("Belko"), Hadiza Moussa Gros and Seydou Tahirou Mayaki, as well as three party members Seyni Mounkaïla, Ladan Tchana and former Political Bureau member Oumarou Dogari. All were supporters of Hama Amadou. According to Soumana Sanda, this was because of their support for the former prime minister. On 14 May, the National Assembly admitted five replacement deputies, chosen by the ruling party: Abdoulaye Koro, Abdoulaye Morou, Soumana Kangaye, Amadou Saidou, and Amina Ali.

Parliamentary elections were held in October 2009; presidential elections were postponed following a controversial referendum that extended Tandja's term in office. With the elections boycotted by several opposition parties, the MNSD won an absolute majority, taking 76 of the 113 seats. However, a coup the following year removed Tandja from office and general elections were held in 2011. Oumarou was the MNSD's presidential candidate, finishing second in the first round of voting and losing to Issoufou of the PNDS in the second. The MNSD became the second-largest party in the National Assembly behind the PNSD, winning 25 seats.

In the 2016 general elections Oumarou contested the presidency again, this time finishing third with 12% of the vote. The party subsequently participated in an opposition boycott of the second round as Issoufou was re-elected. In the National Assembly elections, the MNSD lost five seats as it was pushed into third place by the PNDS and MODEN/FA. A few months after Issoufou's re-election, Oumarou announced in August 2016 that the MNSD was joining the "presidential majority" coalition of parties supporting Issoufou. That move was followed by the MNSD's inclusion in the government and the appointment of Oumarou as High Representative of President Issoufou in October 2016.

== Electoral history ==
=== Presidential elections ===
Election	Party candidate	Votes	%	Votes	%	Result
Election	Party candidate	First Round		Second Round		Result
1989	Ali Saibou	3,316,182	99.6%	-	-	Elected ✓
1993	Mamadou Tandja	443,233	34.22%	639,418	45.58%	Lost ✗
1996	Mamadou Tandja	378,322	15.65%	-	-	Lost ✗
1999	Mamadou Tandja	617,320	32.33%	1,061,731	59.89%	Elected ✓
2004	Mamadou Tandja	991,764	40.67%	1,509,905	65.53%	Elected ✓
2011	Seyni Oumarou	766,215	23.23%	1,299,436	41.96%	Lost ✗
2016	Seyni Oumarou	563,613	12.12%	-	-	Lost ✗
2020–21	Seyni Oumarou	428,083	8.95%	-	-	Lost ✗

=== National Assembly elections ===
Election	Party leader	Votes	%	Seats	+/–	Position
1989	Ali Saibou	3,316,182	99.6%	93 / 93	▲93	▲1st
1993	Mamadou Tandja	383,921	30.65%	29 / 83	▼64	1st
1995	Mamadou Tandja	467,080	32.30%	29 / 83	Steady	1st
1996	Mamadou Tandja	Boycotted		0 / 83	▼29	
1999	Mamadou Tandja	611,097	34.65%	38 / 83	▲38	▲1st
2004	Mamadou Tandja	849,365	37.13%	47 / 113	▲9	1st
2009	Mamadou Tandja	1,422,698	47.33%	76 / 113	▲29	1st
2011	Seyni Oumarou	664,525	20.57%	25 / 113	▼51	▼2nd
2016	Seyni Oumarou	488,584	10.26%	20 / 171	▼5	▼3rd
2020–21	Seyni Oumarou	319,189	6.77%	13 / 171	▼7	3rd
