= 1996 Nigerien parliamentary election =

Parliamentary elections were held in Niger on 23 November 1996. They followed the constitutional changes approved in a referendum earlier in the year, which re-introduced multi-party democracy suspended by an earlier military coup. However, the eight main opposition parties boycotted the elections after forming the Front for the Restoration and Defence of Democracy. The result was a victory for the National Union of Independents for Democratic Renewal, which won 59 of the 83 seats, three of which were won in by-elections after the original result had been invalidated by the Supreme Court.

== Results ==
Party	Votes	%	Seats	+/–
National Union of Independents for Democratic Renewal	990,308	66.03	59	New
Nigerien Alliance for Democracy and Progress	123,957	8.26	8	–1
Party of the Masses for Labour	107,000	7.13	2	New
Union of Democratic and Progressive Patriots	91,944	6.13	4	+3
Union for Democracy and Social Progress	36,899	2.46	3	+1
Party for People's Dignity	21,475	1.43	3	New
Movement for Democracy and Progress	7,562	0.50	1	New
Other parties	73,862	4.92	0	–
Independents	46,805	3.12	3	+3
Total	1,499,812	100.00	83	0
Valid votes	1,499,812	97.65		
Invalid/blank votes	36,151	2.35		
Total votes	1,535,963	100.00		
Registered voters/turnout	3,939,101	38.99		
Source: Nohlen et al.
