= National Union of Independents for Democratic Renewal =

The National Union of Independents for Democratic Renewal (French: Union nationale des indépendants pour le renouveau démocratique, UNIRD) was a political party in Niger. It was created in 1996 to support the leader of the January 1996 coup, Ibrahim Baré Maïnassara.

== History ==
The party was established following the January 1996 coup in order to support the candidacy of coup leader Ibrahim Baré Maïnassara in the July 1996 presidential elections. In the November 1996 parliamentary elections, which were boycotted by most opposition parties, it won 59 of the 83 seats.

The following year the party was dissolved and replaced by the Rally for Democracy and Progress.
