= Movement for Democracy and Progress (Niger) =

Political party in Niger

Movement for Democracy and Progress Mouvement pour la démocratie et le progrès
- Leader: Maï Manga Boukar
- Founded: 1992

The Movement for Democracy and Progress (French: Mouvement pour la démocratie et le progrès, MDP-Alkawali), also known as the Movement for Democracy and Pan-Africanism, is a political party in Niger.

== History ==
The MDP was established in 1992. In the 1993 parliamentary elections it received 0.5% of the vote, failing to win a seat in the National Assembly. It also failed to win a seat in the 1995 elections, but won one seat in the 1996 elections, which were boycotted by the main opposition parties. Party leader Maï Manga Boukar was subsequently appointed Minister of Mines and Industry.

The party contested the 1999 parliamentary elections in alliance with the Party for Socialism and Democracy in Niger, but failed to win a seat.
