= 1999 Nigerien coup d'état =

Military overthrow and assassination of Ibrahim Baré Maïnassara

Date	9 April 1999; 27 years ago
Location	Niger
Result	Government overthrown; Ibrahim Baré Maïnassara assassinated; Daouda Malam Wanké installed as President

Belligerents
Government of Niger	Niger Presidential Guard

Commanders and leaders
(Niger) President Ibrahim Baré Maïnassara X	(Niger) Daouda Malam Wanké (Niger) Moussa Moumouni Djermakoye (Niger) Djibrilla Hima Hamidou

Strength
	Unknown

Casualties and losses
1	0

The 1999 Nigerien coup d'état occurred on 9 April 1999 and resulted in the death of President Ibrahim Baré Maïnassara and the installation of Daouda Malam Wanké as President on 11 April. Maïnassara was shot under unclear circumstances in an ambush at either Diori Hamani International Airport, potentially while attempting to flee the country, or at a military base, likely by members of the Presidential Guard.

== Background ==
Maïnassara, a career soldier, had seized power in a coup d'état in January 1996. In doing so, he removed democratically elected President Mahamane Ousmane. Five months later, a new constitution was approved by referendum in May 1996, and a presidential election was held on July 7–8, 1996. Maïnassara took about 52% of the vote, but the election was almost universally perceived as fraudulent. The second day of polling, Maïnassara dissolved the electoral commission and replaced it with a new commission. On the same day, he also placed all four of his opposition candidates under house arrest, which lasted for two weeks. Maïnassara was sworn in on August 7.
The National Union of Independents for Democratic Renewal (UNIRD) was established in 1996 to support Maïnassara in that year's elections, but subsequently the Rally for Democracy and Progress-Jama'a was established as the ruling party. Due to the constitution barring presidents from leading parties, Hamid Algabid became leader of the RDP-Jama'a in August 1997.

Local elections were held in February 1999, and in early April the Supreme Court released results which showed the opposition winning more seats than Maïnassara's supporters; the Court also cancelled the results in many areas and ordered elections there to be held again. The opposition called for protests against the cancellation of results on April 8.

== Aftermath ==
The new constitution adopted following the July 1999 referendum provided amnesty for participants in both the 1996 and 1999 coups. An investigation into Maïnassara's death had started in June 1999, but following the implementation of amnesty the investigation was ended in September.

Wanké led a transitional government towards democratic elections, which were held in October and November 1999. The elections saw Mamadou Tandja become President of Niger in December 1999, who was later ousted in the 2010 Nigerien coup d'état following a constitutional crisis in 2009, which was caused by Tandja's efforts to remain in office beyond the originally scheduled end of his term.
