= 2004 Nigerien general election =

- 16 November 2004 (first round); 4 December 2004 (second round)
- Presidential election
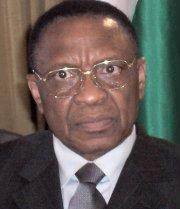

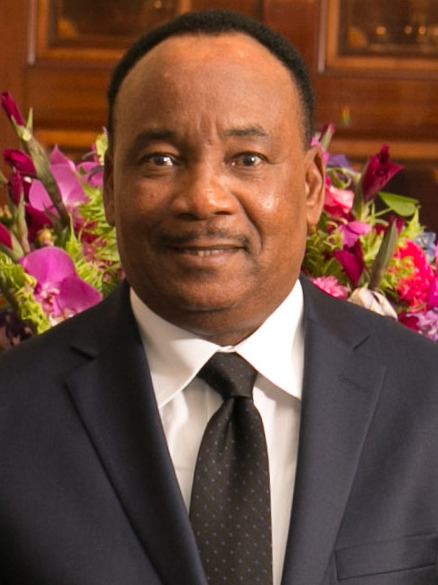
Nominee	Mamadou Tandja	Mahamadou Issoufou
Party	MNSD	PNDS
Popular vote	1,509,905	794,397
Percentage	65.53%	34.47%
President before election
Mamadou Tandja
MNSD
Elected President
Mamadou Tandja
MNSD

General elections were held in Niger in 2004; the first round of the presidential elections was held on 16 November, with a run-off held alongside National Assembly elections on 4 December. The presidential elections were won by Mamadou Tandja of the National Movement for the Society of Development (MNSD). The MNSD also emerged as the largest party in the National Assembly, winning 47 of the 113 seats.

== Electoral system ==
The President was elected using the two-round system. The 113 members of the National Assembly were elected by two methods; 105 from eight multi-member constituencies by proportional representation system and the remaining eight members in special single-member constituencies to ensure representation of national minorities.

== Results ==
=== President ===
No candidate won a majority of votes in the first round, and a second round was held on 4 December between the two leading candidates – incumbent president Mamadou and Mahamadou Issoufou. All four of the candidates eliminated in the first round backed Tandja in the second round, and Tandja won the elections with 65.53% of the vote. International and local observers declared the entire process as free, fair, and transparent.

Candidate	Party	First round		Second round	
Candidate	Party	Votes	%	Votes	%
Mamadou Tandja	National Movement for the Society of Development	991,764	40.67	1,509,905	65.53
Mahamadou Issoufou	Nigerien Party for Democracy and Socialism	599,792	24.60	794,397	34.47
Mahamane Ousmane	Democratic and Social Convention	425,052	17.43		
Amadou Cheiffou	Social Democratic Rally	154,732	6.35		
Moumouni Adamou Djermakoye	Nigerien Alliance for Democracy and Progress	147,957	6.07		
Hamid Algabid	Rally for Democracy and Progress	119,153	4.89		
Total		2,438,450	100.00	2,304,302	100.00
Valid votes		2,438,450	96.17	2,304,302	97.49
Invalid/blank votes		97,043	3.83	59,390	2.51
Total votes		2,535,493	100.00	2,363,692	100.00
Registered voters/turnout		5,255,232	48.25	5,256,581	44.97
Source: African Elections Database, IFES

=== National Assembly ===
Party	Votes	%	Seats	+/–
National Movement for the Society of Development	849,365	37.13	47	+9
Democratic and Social Convention	397,628	17.38	22	+5
Nigerien Party for Democracy and Socialism	314,810	13.76	17	+1
Social Democratic Rally	163,369	7.14	7	New
Rally for Democracy and Progress	149,825	6.55	6	–2
Nigerien Alliance for Democracy and Progress	124,843	5.46	5	+1
PNDS–UNI–UDR	66,931	2.93	2	–
PNDS–PPN-RDA–PNA	61,997	2.71	4	–
PNDS–PPN-RDA	42,526	1.86	2	–
Party for Socialism and Democracy in Niger	29,905	1.31	1	+1
PMT–ANDP	18,971	0.83	0	–
Movement for Unity and Recovery of the Nation	13,603	0.59	0	New
Sawaba	13,006	0.57	0	0
Gobir Katsina Independents	7,613	0.33	0	New
Patriotic Movement for Solidarity and Progress	6,136	0.27	0	0
Union of Nigerien Democrats and Socialists	5,894	0.26	0	New
RSD–RDP	5,852	0.26	0	–
Party of Consultation and Peace	4,731	0.21	0	New
Union of Democratic and Progressive Patriots	4,442	0.19	0	0
Party for People's Dignity	2,811	0.12	0	0
Party for National Unity and Development	1,950	0.09	0	New
Union for Democracy and the Republic	1,602	0.07	0	0
Total	2,287,810	100.00	113	+30
Valid votes	2,287,810	97.65		
Invalid/blank votes	55,019	2.35		
Total votes	2,342,829	100.00		
Registered voters/turnout	5,278,598	44.38		
Source: Constitutional Court

== Aftermath ==
Following the election, MNSD-Nassara resumed its previous ruling coalition with junior partner Democratic and Social Convention, whose 22 seats give a 69-seat majority in the National Assembly.
