= 1996 Nigerien presidential election =

- 7–8 July 1996
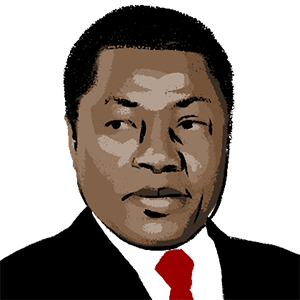

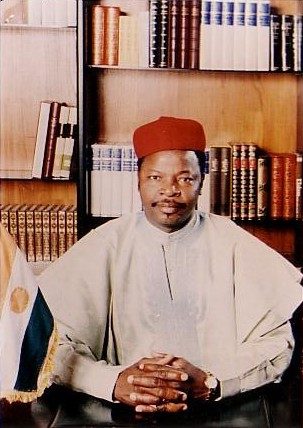

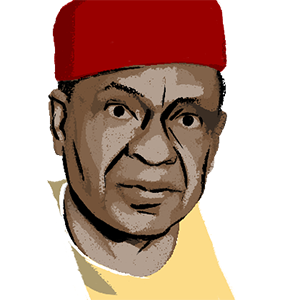

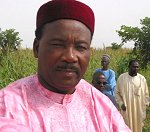
Nominee	Ibrahim Baré Maïnassara	Mahamane Ousmane
Party	Independent	CDS-Rahama
Alliance	UNIRD
Popular vote	1,262,308	477,431
Percentage	52.22%	19.75%
Nominee	Mamadou Tandja	Mahamadou Issoufou
Party	MNSD-Nassara	PNDS-Tarayya
Popular vote	378,322	183,826
Percentage	15.65%	7.60%
- Results by region
President before election
Ibrahim Baré Maïnassara
Independent
Elected President
Ibrahim Baré Maïnassara
Independent

Presidential elections were held in Niger on 7 and 8 July 1996. They followed the approval of a new constitution in a referendum in May after a military coup had ousted the first democratically elected President Mahamane Ousmane from office in January. Colonel Ibrahim Baré Maïnassara, who had been installed as leader following the coup, won the elections in the first round, claiming 52% of the vote, with a 66% turnout.

== Results ==
Candidate	Party	Votes	%
Ibrahim Baré Maïnassara	Independent	1,262,308	52.22
Mahamane Ousmane	Democratic and Social Convention	477,431	19.75
Mamadou Tandja	National Movement for the Society of Development	378,322	15.65
Mahamadou Issoufou	Nigerien Party for Democracy and Socialism	183,826	7.60
Moumouni Adamou Djermakoye	Nigerien Alliance for Democracy and Progress	115,302	4.77
Total		2,417,189	100.00
Valid votes		2,417,189	95.73
Invalid/blank votes		107,830	4.27
Total votes		2,525,019	100.00
Registered voters/turnout		3,804,750	66.36
Source: African Elections Database
