= Mahamadou Issoufou =

President of Niger from 2011 to 2021

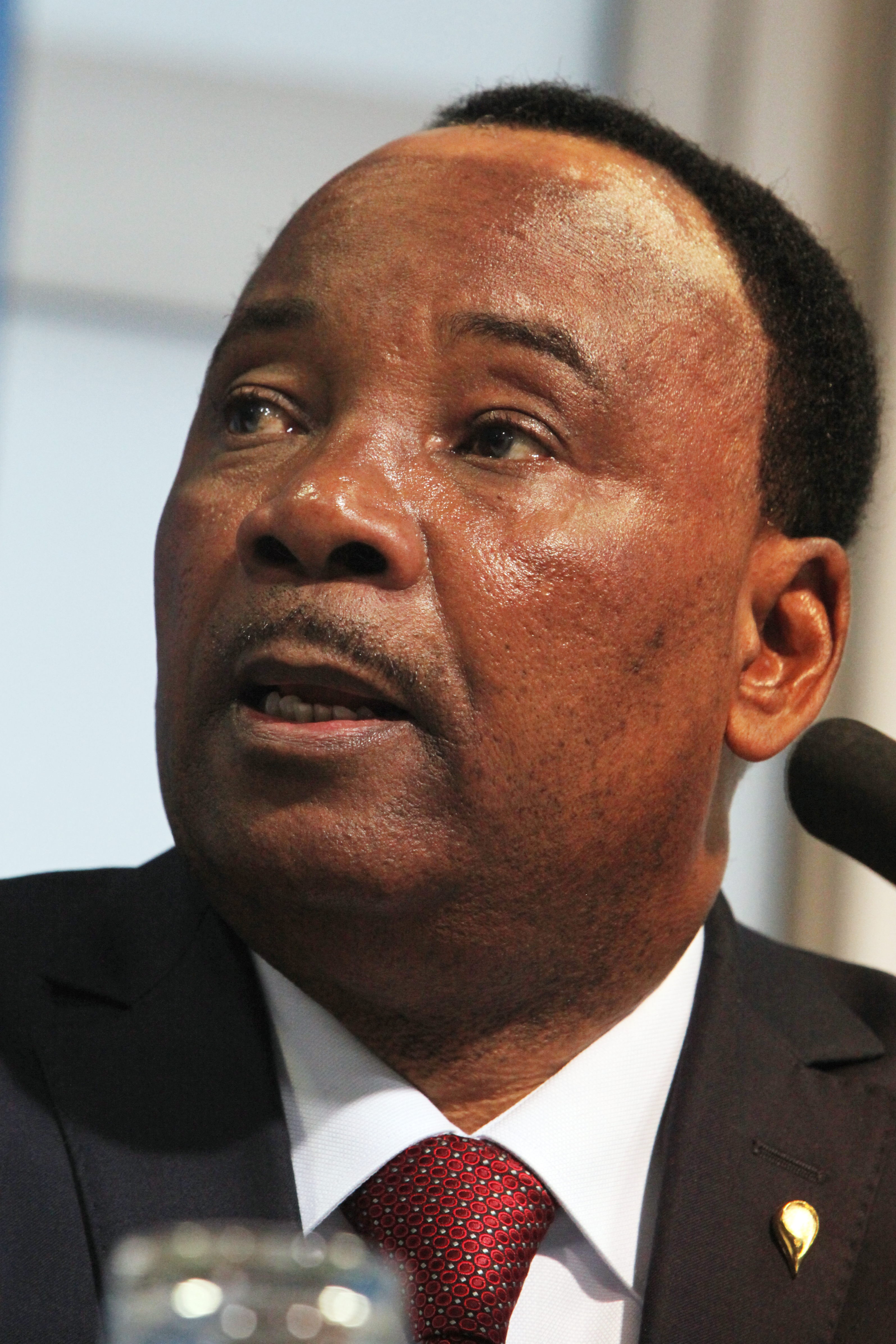
- Issoufou in 2012

9th President of Niger
- In office 7 April 2011 – 2 April 2021
- Prime Minister: Brigi Rafini
- Preceded by: Salou Djibo (Chairman of the Supreme Council for the Restoration of Democracy)
- Succeeded by: Mohamed Bazoum

5th Prime Minister of Niger
- In office 17 April 1993 – 28 September 1994
- President: Mahamane Ousmane
- Preceded by: Amadou Cheiffou
- Succeeded by: Souley Abdoulaye

Personal details
- Born: 1 January 1952 (age 74) Dandaji, French West Africa (now Niger)
- Party: Nigerien Party for Democracy and Socialism
- Spouse(s): Aïssata Issoufou Mahamadou; Lalla Malika Issoufou
- Children: Mariam Kamara; Sani Issoufou Mahamadou

Mahamadou Issoufou (born 1 January 1952) is a Nigerien politician who served as the president of Niger from 7 April 2011 to 2 April 2021. Issoufou was the prime minister of Niger from 1993 to 1994, president of the National Assembly from 1995 to 1996, and a candidate in each presidential election from 1993 to 2016. He led the Nigerien Party for Democracy and Socialism (PNDS-Tarayya), a social democratic party, from its foundation in 1990 until his election as president in 2011. During the presidency of Mamadou Tandja (1999–2010), Issoufou was the main opposition leader.

Having left power by respecting the constitution that limited him to two presidential terms, thus leading to the first ever democratic transition of power in the country, in March 2021 he received the Ibrahim Prize for good governance, democratic election and respect of term limits.

== Background ==
Issoufou, an ethnic Hausa, was born on 1 January 1952, in the town of Dandaji in Tahoua Department. An engineer by trade (Ingénieur Civil des Mines de St Etienne), he served as National Director of Mines from 1980 to 1985 before becoming Secretary-General of the Mining Company of Niger (SOMAIR). He is married to Aïssata Issoufou Mahamadou, a chemist, and to second wife, Dr. Lalla Malika Issoufou, a physician.

== 1993 presidential election and appointment as prime minister ==
In February 1993, the country's first multiparty legislative and presidential elections were held. In the parliamentary election, Issoufou's party, the PNDS, won 13 seats in the National Assembly, and Issoufou himself won a seat as a PNDS candidate in Tahoua constituency.

Together with other opposition parties, the PNDS then joined a coalition, the Alliance of the Forces of Change (AFC). This coalition held the majority of the newly elected seats in the National Assembly. Later in February 1993, Issoufou ran as the PNDS candidate in the presidential election. He placed third, winning 15.92 percent of the vote. The AFC then supported second-place finisher Mahamane Ousmane for president in the second round of the election, held on 27 March. Ousmane won the election, defeating Tandja Mamadou, the candidate of the National Movement of the Development Society (MNSD); with the AFC holding a parliamentary majority, Issoufou became Prime Minister on 17 April 1993.

== Conflict, cohabitation, and arrest: 1994–1999 ==
On 28 September 1994, Issoufou resigned in response to a decree from Ousmane a week earlier that weakened the powers of the prime minister, and the PNDS withdrew from the governing coalition. As a result, the coalition lost its parliamentary majority and Ousmane called a new parliamentary election to be held in January 1995.

Issoufou and the PNDS forged an alliance with their old opponents, the MNSD, and in the January 1995 election that alliance won a slight majority of seats; Issoufou was then elected as President of the National Assembly. The opposition's victory in the election led to cohabitation between President Ousmane and a government, backed by a parliamentary majority, that opposed him; the result was political deadlock. With the dispute between President Ousmane and the government deepening, on 26 January 1996 Issoufou requested that the Supreme Court remove Ousmane from office for alleged incapacity to govern. A day later, on 27 January 1996, Ibrahim Baré Maïnassara seized power in a military coup. Issoufou, along with President Ousmane and Prime Minister Hama Amadou, was arrested and subsequently placed under house arrest until April 1996. They were all put on television by the military regime in February 1996 to endorse the official view that the coup was caused by flaws in the political system and that changes in the system were needed.

Issoufou placed fourth (receiving only 7.60% of the vote) in the flawed and controversial 7–8 July 1996 presidential election that gave Maïnassara an outright victory. Along with the three other opposition candidates, Issoufou was placed under house arrest on the second day of polling and held for two weeks. Afterward, he refused to meet with Maïnassara, unsuccessfully appealed to the Supreme Court for the election to be annulled, and the PNDS called for demonstrations. On 26 July he was again placed under house arrest, along with another leading PNDS member, Mohamed Bazoum; they were freed on the order of a judge on 12 August. Following a pro-democracy demonstration on 11 January 1997, Issoufou was arrested along with Ousmane and Tandja and held until 23 January.

== Opposition leader: 1999–2010 ==
Maïnassara was killed in another military coup in April 1999, and new elections were held in late in the year. In the first round of the presidential election, held in October, Issoufou placed second, winning 22.79% of the vote. He was later defeated by Mamadou Tandja in the November run-off, capturing 40.11% of the vote compared to Tandja's 59.89%. He was backed in the second round by the unsuccessful first round candidates Hamid Algabid, Moumouni Adamou Djermakoye, and Ali Djibo, while Tandja received Ousmane's support. After the announcement of the provisional results showing Tandja's victory, Issoufou accepted them and congratulated Tandja.

In the November 1999 parliamentary election, Issoufou was again elected to the National Assembly as a PNDS candidate in Tahoua constituency.

In a repeat of the 1999 election, Issoufou placed second behind incumbent Tandja in the 2004 presidential election, winning 24.60% of the vote. He was defeated in the run-off, winning 34.47% of the vote to Tandja's 65.53%; however, that was still considered an impressive result for Issoufou, as he had substantially increased his share of the vote even though the other first round candidates had backed Tandja in the second round. Issoufou, who targeted corruption in his campaign, accused Tandja of using state funds for his own campaign, along with other accusations of electoral misconduct, and said that the election was not as transparent as the 1999 election.

In the December 2004 parliamentary election, Issoufou was re-elected to the National Assembly as a PNDS candidate in Tahoua constituency.

=== 2009 political crisis ===
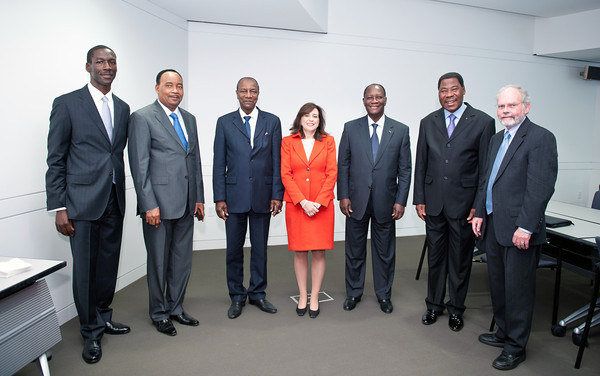
Issoufou (2nd from left) in 2011

In 2009, the PNDS strongly opposed Tandja's efforts to hold a referendum on the creation of a new constitution that would allow him to run for re-election indefinitely. At an opposition rally in Niamey on 9 May 2009, Issoufou accused Tandja of seeking "a new constitution to stay in power forever" and the establishment of "a dictatorship and a monarchy". As leader of the Front for the Defence of Democracy (FDD) opposition coalition, he said on 4 June 2009 that a planned anti-referendum protest would be held on 7 June despite an official ban.

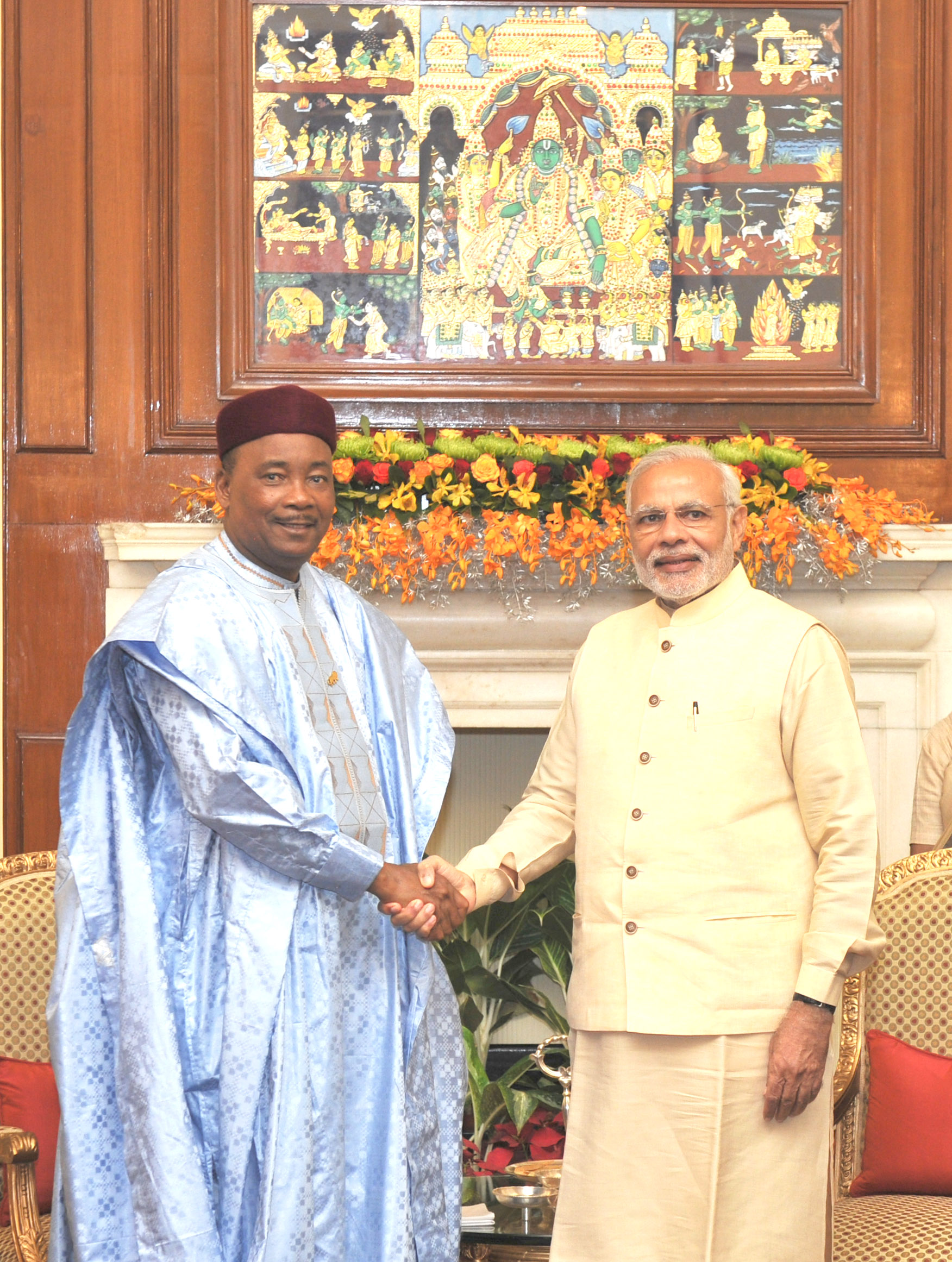
Narendra Modi with Issoufou in October 2015

As part of the constitutional dispute, Tandja assumed emergency powers on 27 June. Accusing Tandja of undertaking a coup d'état, "violating the constitution and ... forfeit[ing] all political and moral legitimacy", Issoufou called on the armed forces to ignore his orders and urged the international community to intervene. Issoufou was detained at his home by the army's paramilitary police on 30 June; he was questioned and released after about an hour. A nationwide strike called by the FDD was held on 1 July and was deemed partially successful by the press.

The referendum was held on 4 August 2009, despite the opposition's furious objections and calls for a boycott, and it was successful. Speaking on 8 August, shortly after the announcement of results, Issoufou vowed that the opposition would "resist and fight against this coup d'etat enacted by President Tandja and against his aim of installing a dictatorship in our country".

On 14 September 2009, Issoufou was charged with misappropriation of funds and then released on bail. He said that he was actually charged for political reasons. He left the country. On 29 October 2009, international warrants for the arrest of Issoufou and Hama Amadou were issued by the Nigerien government, and Issoufou returned to Niamey from Nigeria late on 30 October in order "to cooperate with the judiciary".

Tandja was ousted in a February 2010 military coup, and a new transitional junta enabled the opposition leaders to return to politics in Niger while preparing for elections in 2011. At a meeting in early November 2010, the PNDS designated Issoufou as the party's candidate for the January 2011 presidential election. Issoufou said on the occasion that "the moment has come, the conditions are right", and he called on party members to "turn these conditions into votes at the ballot box". Some observers considered Issoufou to be potentially the strongest candidate in the election.

== Presidency (2011–2021) ==
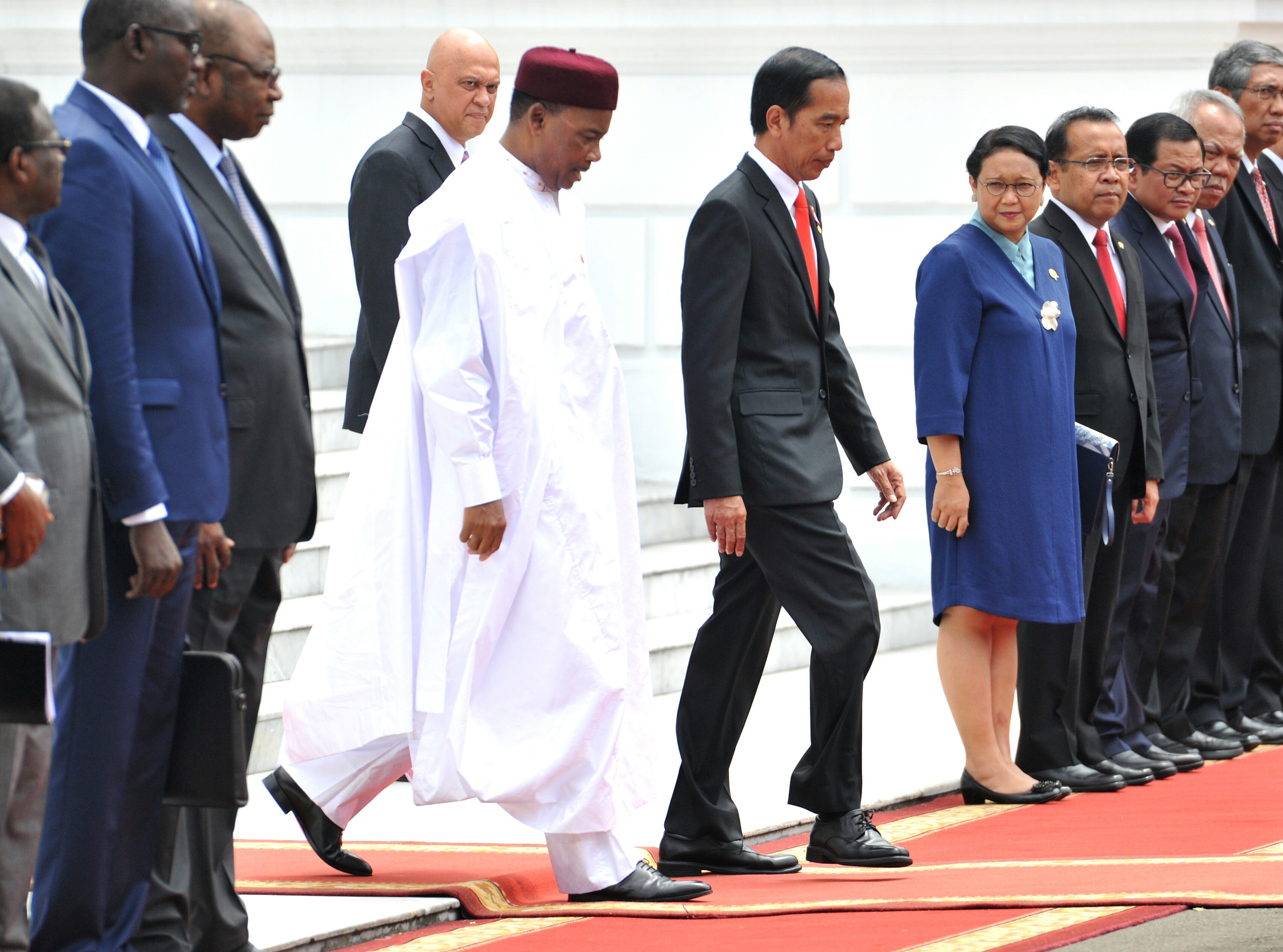
Joko Widodo with Issoufou in 2017

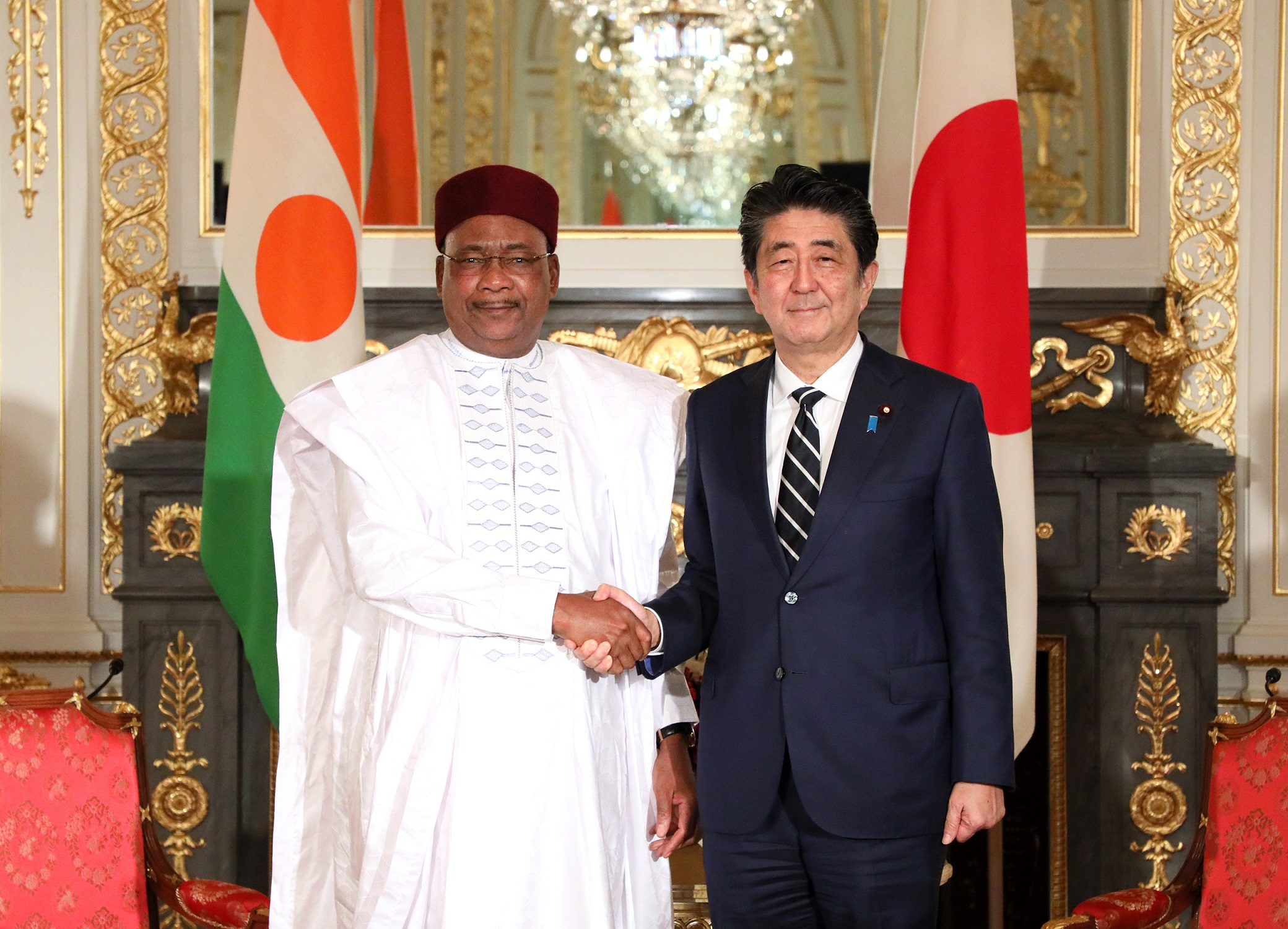
Shinzo Abe and Mahamadou Issoufou in October 2019

Issoufou won the January–March 2011 presidential election in a second round of voting against MNSD candidate Seyni Oumarou and was inaugurated as president on 7 April 2011, succeeding Salou Djibo, the Chairman of the Supreme Council for the Restoration of Democracy. He named Brigi Rafini as Prime Minister.

In July 2011, a planned assassination of Issoufou was allegedly uncovered. A major, lieutenant, and three other soldiers in Niger's military were arrested.

On 7 November 2015, the PNDS designated Issoufou as its candidate for the 2016 presidential election. In February 2016 Issoufou won 48% of the votes in the first round of the elections. As no candidate obtained a majority a second round was needed. A coalition of opposition parties boycotted the second round, saying that Issoufou had become increasingly authoritarian. Issoufou subsequently won with 92.5% of the votes. He has been described by The Economist as "a staunch ally of the West".

In 2020 he announced that he would not run for a third term in the 2020–21 Nigerien general election.

On 31 March 2021, two days before Issoufou's term was to expire, his government thwarted a coup attempt by dissident military officers believed to have been plotting to prevent the inauguration of his successor, Mohamed Bazoum.

== Post-presidency ==
Following Bazoum's removal and detention during the 2023 Nigerien coup d'état in July, Issoufou was reportedly involved in negotiations for his release. He later reiterated his call for Bazoum's release and restoration to office during the subsequent 2023 Nigerien crisis in August. His son, Bazoum's oil minister Mahamane Sani Mahamadou was among several officials arrested by the military junta formed after the coup.

== Other activities ==
- International Crisis Group (ICG), Board of Trustees (since 2023)

== Honours ==
- Niger:
  - Grand Cross of the National Order of Niger
  - Grand Cross of the Merit Order of Niger.
  - Grand Cross of the Order of Legion d'Honor of France.
  - Grand Cross of the Republic Order of Tunisia.

Political offices
Preceded by Amadou Cheiffou	Prime Minister of Niger; 1993–1994	Succeeded by Souley Abdoulaye
Preceded by Salou Djibo as Chairman of the Supreme Council for the Restoration of Democracy of Niger	President of Niger; 2011–2021	Succeeded by Mohamed Bazoum
Party political offices
New political party	President of the Nigerien Party for Democracy and Socialism; 1990–2011	Succeeded by Mohamed Bazoum
New political party	Leader of the Nigerien Party for Democracy and Socialism; 1990–present	Incumbent
