= Mahamane Ousmane =

President of Niger from 1993 to 1996

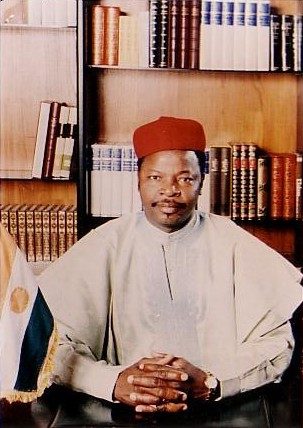
- Official portrait, c. 1993–1996

4th President of Niger
- In office 16 April 1993 – 27 January 1996
- Prime Minister: Mahamadou Issoufou; Souley Abdoulaye; Hama Amadou
- Preceded by: Ali Saibou
- Succeeded by: Ibrahim Baré Maïnassara

President of the National Assembly of Niger
- In office December 1999 – May 2009
- Preceded by: Moutari Moussa
- Succeeded by: Seyni Oumarou

Speaker of the ECOWAS Parliament
- In office 2006–2011

Personal details
- Born: 20 January 1950 (age 76) Zinder, Niger
- Party: Democratic and Republican Renewal (since 2020)
- Other political affiliations: Democratic and Social Convention-Rahama
- Spouse: Nana Mariama Ibrahim Adjia
- Children: 9

Mahamane Ousmane (born 20 January 1950) is a Nigerien politician. Elected as the fourth President of Niger at 43 years old, he is the youngest elected president in Africa. He was also the first democratically elected president of his country, serving from 16 April 1993 until he was deposed in a military coup d'état on 27 January 1996. He has continued to run for president in each election since his ouster, and he was president of the National Assembly from December 1999 to May 2009. Since April 2020, he is the president of the Democratic and Republican Renewal (RDR Tchanji), a major political party that is currently in opposition. RDR Tchanji formed an alliance with Ousmane's other political vehicle, MNRD Hankuri, on 16 December 2018.

== 1993 presidential election ==
Ousmane, the candidate of the CDS, ran for president in the election held on 27 February 1993. He received second place, with 26.59% of the vote, behind Tandja Mamadou of the National Movement for the Development of Society (MNSD); however, with the backing of a coalition of parties known as the Alliance of the Forces of Change (AFC), Ousmane won the presidency in the second round, held on 27 March, taking 54.42%.

== Presidency ==
During the second part of Ousmane's term, the AFC, which included Ousmane's party, held a parliamentary majority. In September 1993, however, Ousmane issued a decree that reduced the powers of the prime minister; the resignation of prime minister Mahamadou Issoufou soon followed, along with the withdrawal of his party, the Nigerien Party for Democracy and Socialism (PNDS), from the governing coalition. This left the coalition without a parliamentary majority; despite this, Ousmane appointed his CDS ally Souley Abdoulaye as prime minister, but the parliament quickly passed a vote of no confidence against Abdoulaye. Consequently, new parliamentary elections were called for January 1995. These elections resulted in a victory for the opposition, composed of a new alliance between the MNSD and the PNDS, and forced cohabitation between Ousmane and a government headed by MNSD Prime Minister Hama Amadou. This resulted in sharp rivalry and government deadlock; beginning in April, Ousmane refused to attend meetings of the Council of Ministers although he was constitutionally required to do so, and in July Amadou replaced the heads of state-owned companies, a move which Ousmane wanted to be reversed. Amadou also tried to assume the presidential role with regard to the Council of Ministers. Tensions continued to escalate, and Ousmane made clear his intention to dissolve the parliament and call new elections after the passing of one year (he was constitutionally prohibited from doing so sooner).

On 27 January 1996, Ibrahim Baré Maïnassara seized power in a military coup, pointing to the disordered political situation as justification. Ousmane was arrested and held at a military barracks for five days; he was then placed under house arrest until 24 April as were Amadou and Issoufou. In February, Ousmane was put on television, along with Amadou and Issoufou, to express the view that flaws in the operation of the political system were the cause of the coup, and to call for changes in the system.

== 1996 and 1999 elections ==
Ousmane received second place, with 19.75% of the vote, in the 7–8 July, 1996 presidential election, which was won by Maïnassara; on the second day of polling he was again placed under house arrest and was freed after two weeks. Following a pro-democracy demonstration on 11 January 1997, Ousmane was arrested along with Tandja and Issoufou and held until 23 January.

Ousmane took third place, with 22.51% of the vote, in the October 1999 presidential election, which occurred after the assassination of Maïnassara; he placed slightly behind second-place finisher Issoufou and therefore did not participate in the run-off held in November. Ousmane gave his support to Tandja, and Tandja defeated Issoufou to win the second round.

The November 1999 parliamentary election gave a majority to an alliance of Tandja's MNSD and Ousmane's CDS. Ousmane was elected to the National Assembly from Zinder constituency, and on 29 December 1999, he was elected President of the National Assembly.

== Events since 1999 ==
Ousmane was elected as the president of the Interparliamentary Committee of the West African Economic and Monetary Union on 9 March 2003, at its 12th session, and he was re-elected to that post at the 13th session in March 2004. He was also elected as the president of the Committee on the Human Rights of Parliamentarians of the Inter-Parliamentary Union (IPU) on 15 January 2004.

Ousmane was again chosen as the CDS presidential candidate at the party's fifth extraordinary congress, held on 18 September 2004. He took third place in the November 2004 presidential election, receiving 17.4% of the vote. Following the December 2004 parliamentary election, Ousmane was re-elected President of the National Assembly on 16 December.

On 14 November 2006, Ousmane was elected as Speaker of the Economic Community of West African States (ECOWAS) Parliament, defeating another Nigerien politician, Moumouni Adamou Djermakoye, by a vote of 58 to 37. He was to lead the regional parliament's second legislature through a four-year transition period, which was set to end in 2010. In that position, he faced the task of coordinating the processes that would facilitate the introduction of direct universal suffrage in the election of members of the Parliament.

Objecting to Tandja's efforts to call a referendum on a constitutional change that could allow him to continue as president, the CDS left the government in June 2009. Ousmane stressed that the CDS wanted the constitution to be respected and that Tandja "must submit himself to the decision of the Constitutional Court", which had ruled against the referendum.

In opposition, the CDS participated in an opposition boycott of the August 2009 constitutional referendum as well as the October 2009 parliamentary election. With the hostility between the opposition and the Tandja government deepening, the authorities issued a warrant for Ousmane's arrest; they also issued arrest warrants for PNDS President Mahamadou Issoufou and former Prime Minister Hama Amadou. Ousmane was living outside of Niger by that point. Following talks with officials from the European Union on 8 December 2009, Prime Minister Ali Badjo Gamatie announced that the arrest warrants were suspended to facilitate dialogue with the opposition. Ousmane said on 10 December that the move was encouraging, but that it was also necessary for the government to release those who he characterized as political prisoners. However, the arrest warrants were reactivated two weeks later, diminishing hopes for further dialogue. The government warned that Ousmane and the other opposition leaders would face arrest if they entered Niger.

Tandja was ousted in a military coup on 18 February 2010. That made it possible for Ousmane to return to Niger without being arrested, and he "arrived discreetly" on a flight from Abuja on 24 March 2010.

Ousmane was again chosen as the CDS presidential candidate for the February 2011 elections. He was unsuccessful in returning to the presidency again; this time coming in fourth place with 8.2% of the vote. In the 2016 presidential election, Ousmane again came fourth with 6.2% of the vote. In the 2020–21 election, he advanced to a runoff but lost to Mohamed Bazoum with 44.3% of the vote.

== See also ==
- History of Niger

Preceded by Ali Saibou	President of Niger; 1993–1996	Succeeded by Ibrahim Baré Maïnassara
Preceded by Moutari Moussa	President of the National Assembly of Niger; 1999–2009	Succeeded by Seyni Oumarou
Preceded by Nouhoum Ali Diallo	Speaker of ECOWAS Parliament; 2006–2011	Succeeded by Ike Ekweremadu
