= 1996 Nigerien coup d'état =

Military overthrow of Mahamane Ousmane

Date	27 January 1996
Location	Niger
Result	Government overthrown; Mahamane Ousmane deposed; Ibrahim Baré Maïnassara installed as head of state

Belligerents
Government of Niger	Niger Armed Forces

Commanders and leaders
(Niger) President Mahamane Ousmane	(Niger) Ibrahim Baré Maïnassara

Strength
	Unknown

Casualties and losses
- Several

The 1996 Nigerien coup d'état was a military coup d'état which occurred on 27 January 1996 in Niamey, Niger. It ousted Niger's first democratically elected president, Mahamane Ousmane after nearly three years in power and installed General Ibrahim Baré Maïnassara as head of state. Prime Minister Hama Amadou was arrested in the coup and several soldiers and presidential guards were killed in the fighting.

== Background ==
On 27 March 1993, Niger's first democratic presidential elections were held under a constitutional inspired by the that of the French Fifth Republic. Mahamane Ousmane was elected President of the Republic with 55.42% of the vote against Mamadou Tandja, the leader of the National Movement for the Development of Society (MNSD). During his presidency, Ousmane was confronted by social and economic crises, as well as a Tuareg rebellion. He signed a peace treaty with the Tuaregs on 24 April 1995. However, following a reversal of alliances, Ousmane found himself in a minority position in the Nigerien Parliament. He called for early legislative elections in February 1995, which were won by the MNSD, the main opposition party. A confidant of Mamadou Tandja, Hama Amadou, became prime minister under a cohabitation with president Ousmane, giving way to a complex political situation in a still yet nascent democracy.

The conflict between the president and the prime minister paralyzed the country for almost one year, while the economic situation was already catastrophic following a stalemate in negotiations with financial backers due to political instability, falling prices for Niger's only export, uranium, and a depreciation of the Nigerian naira that cancelled out the effect of the CFA franc's devaluation. Additionally, an epidemic of meningitis in 1995 further compounded the dire situation, with a largely inadequate response from Niger's public health authorities.

At the head of the Niger Armed Forces' general staff was Ibrahim Baré Maïnassara, a paratrooper officer who had participated in Seyni Kountché's 1974 coup d'état that deposed Niger's first president, Hamani Diori. After the coup, Baré Maïnassara remained in constant close proximity to Niger's ruling circles. As an ex military attaché and ambassador in Paris, he was also well known to Niger's former colonial ruler, France, a country whose influence and control has remained decisive. Baré Maïnassara threatened Ousmane with military intervention for the first time in 1995, and a short-lived compromise was stricken. However, after only a few weeks, tensions reached new heights, leading Ousmane to threaten to dissolve the National Assembly and the parliamentary majority in turn threatening to impeach Ousmane.

== Events ==
On the afternoon of 27 January 1996, the army, commanded by colonel Baré Maïnassara, entered into action by imprisoning the three highest ranking members of the government and suspending political parties. Several soldiers and members of the presidential guard were killed during the combat. The leadership of Niger was subsequently given to a twelve-member Council of National Safety with Baré Maïnassara assuming its leadership role.

== Aftermath ==
The Nigerien constitution was revised following the coup to reinforce the presidential powers. However, under international pressure, Baré Maïnassara was forced to hold new presidential elections.

For these elections, political parties were reauthorized in May 1996. These political parties presented four candidates, including the recently deposed Mahamane Ousmane and Mamadou Tanja, leader of the MNSD. Baré Maïnassara, who had since declared himself general "at the request of the chiefdom," was the fifth presidential candidate, insisting on his independence from the other participating parties. The elections were held in July 1996, but their legitimacy was questionable. Baré Maïnassara dissolved the independent National Electoral Commission in order to achieve victory. Legislative elections were held in November 1996 but were boycotted by opposition parties in protest against the election fraud that took place during the presidential elections of July 1996, and thus every seat in the National Assembly was won by candidates favorable to Baré Maïnassara. Baré Maïnassara was able to use these elections to hold onto power despite his stated intention to return the government to civilian rule as soon as possible.

Maïnassara stayed in power until April 1999, when his regime was overthrown and he was assassinated in the 1999 Nigerien coup d'état.
