= Mamadou Tandja =

President of Niger from 1999 to 2010

Lieutenant Colonel Mamadou Tandja
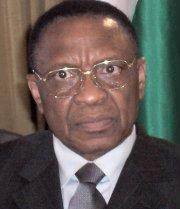
- Tandja in 2007

7th President of Niger
- In office 22 December 1999 – 18 February 2010
- Prime Minister: Ibrahim Hassane Mayaki; Hama Amadou; Seyni Oumarou; Albadé Abouba (Acting); Ali Badjo Gamatié
- Preceded by: Daouda Malam Wanké (Chairman of the National Reconciliation Council)
- Succeeded by: Salou Djibo (Chairman of the Supreme Council for the Restoration of Democracy)

Personal details
- Born: 1938 Maïné-Soroa, French West Africa (now Niger)
- Died: 24 November 2020 (aged 82) Niamey, Niger
- Party: National Movement for the Development of Society
- Spouse(s): Laraba Tandja; Fati Tandja

Military service
- Allegiance: Niger
- Branch/service: Niger Army
- Rank: Lieutenant Colonel

Mamadou Tandja (1938 – 24 November 2020) was a Nigerien politician who was President of Niger from 1999 to 2010. He was President of the National Movement for the Development of Society (MNSD) from 1991 to 1999 and unsuccessfully ran as the MNSD's presidential candidate in 1993 and 1996 before being elected to his first term in 1999. While serving as President of Niger, he was also Chairman of the Economic Community of West African States from 2005 to 2007.

Tandja was reported to be the son of a Peul (Fulani) father from Mauritania and a Kanuri mother. The United States Department of State also described Tandja as being half Peul and half Kanuri. He was the first president of Niger who was not ethnically Hausa or Djerma.

Following a constitutional crisis in 2009, which was caused by Tandja's efforts to remain in office beyond his term, he was ousted by the military in a coup d'état on 18 February 2010.

== Early and personal life ==
Tandja was born in Maïné-Soroa in 1938, in the south-eastern part of what is now Niger. He was reported to be of Peul (Fulani) and Kanuri ancestry. Tandja was polygamous and had two wives, Laraba Tandja and Fati Tandja, both of whom claimed the role of First Lady of Niger during his presidency.

== 1974 coup, the Kountché regime and the MNSD ==
After joining the Nigerien army and rising to the rank of colonel, he participated in the 1974 coup that brought Seyni Kountché to power and became a member of the Supreme Military Council. He became Prefect of Maradi in 1976 before being appointed to the government as Minister of the Interior on 10 September 1979; he remained in the latter position until being replaced by Kountché himself on 31 August 1981. He was then Prefect of Tahoua from 1981 to March 1988, Ambassador to Nigeria from June 1988 to March 1990 and minister of the interior again from March 1990 to March 1991.

In 1991, Tandja emerged as the head of one of two powerful factions in the ruling National Movement of the Development Society (Mouvement National pour la Societé de Développement, MNSD) and at a party congress held in November 1991, he was elected as MNSD president. Tandja's obtaining of the party leadership over rival faction leader Moumouni Adamou Djermakoye marked a departure from the traditional dominance of the party by Djermakoye's Zarma (Djerma) ethnic group.

== 1993 election and subsequent events ==
Tandja ran for president in the elections of 1993, taking first place in the first round in February with 34.22% of the vote, but then losing to Mahamane Ousmane in the second round in March, taking 45.58% of the vote. Tandja accepted the results and congratulated Ousmane.

Tandja participated in an opposition protest against the government of the Alliance of the Forces of Change ruling coalition on 16 April 1994 and was arrested along with 90 others. Ousmane was overthrown in a military coup led by Ibrahim Baré Maïnassara on 27 January 1996.

== 1996 election ==
Under Maïnassara, a new presidential election was held on 7–8 July 1996, in which Tandja ran again; this time he took third place with 15.65% of the vote, behind Maïnassara with about 52% and Ousmane with about 20%, according to official results. On the second day of polling he was placed under house arrest along with the other three opposition candidates and held for two weeks. Following a pro-democracy demonstration on 11 January 1997, Tandja was arrested along with Ousmane and former prime minister Mahamadou Issoufou and held until 23 January.

== 1999 election and first term ==
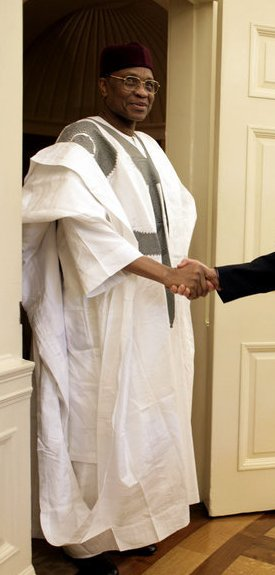
Tandja visiting President of the United States George W. Bush at the Oval Office in Washington, D.C., June 2005.

In April 1999, Maïnassara was assassinated and a new military government led by Major Daouda Malam Wanké took over. This junta promised a return to democracy within the year, and the elections were held in October and November. Tandja won the presidential election, receiving first place, with 32% of the vote, in the first round, and 59.89% in the second round, defeating Issoufou. Tandja received the backing of Ousmane in the second round. The MNSD also won the most seats in the parliamentary election in November 1999 and Tandja himself was elected to the National Assembly as an MNSD candidate from Diffa constituency, although due to his concurrent election as president his seat was filled by his substitute, Nassourou Samaila. He took office as president on 22 December 1999. He appointed Hama Amadou as prime minister in January 2000.

Niger was heavily in debt and was not receiving any foreign aid due to the 1996 coup and subsequent suspension of democratic institutions. Tandja focused on economic development, negotiating with the civil service unions and with foreign donors. Many did not approve of Tandja's measures in reducing government spending. In 2001, students at the University of Niamey staged violent protests against the reduction of their government grants. On 31 July 2002, some soldiers in Diffa started a mutiny demanding pay and improved living conditions; this briefly spread to Niamey a few days later. Loyalists defeated the mutineers and restored peace by 9 August, but Tandja came under political fire for his decrees blocking communication about the rebellion.

== 2004 election and second term ==
Tandja was a candidate for re-election in the 2004 presidential election. In the first round of the election, held on 16 November, he took first place with 40.7% of the vote, the rest being divided between five opponents. As in 1999, Mahamadou Issoufou took second place, and he participated in a runoff with Tandja on 4 December. Tandja was re-elected in the second round with 65.53% of the vote, with Issoufou receiving the remaining 34.47%. All four of the defeated first round candidates supported Tandja in the second round. He was sworn in for his second term on 21 December at a ceremony at the Général Seyni Kountché Stadium in Niamey, which was attended by six other African presidents.

Although there had been speculation about a possible constitutional change to enable Tandja to run again in 2009, he said in an interview with Le Monde, published on 6 October 2007, that he intended to step down at the end of his second term. However, on 21 December 2008, a large rally was held in front of the National Assembly building in Niamey calling for an extension of Tandja's term by three years, so that it would end on 22 December 2012. According to supporters of this proposal—which also called for extending the mandates of the National Assembly and other institutions—a three-year extension would be beneficial to the course of Niger's development. Prime Minister Seyni Oumarou was among those taking part in the rally. The opposition furiously denounced this proposal, and a large demonstration opposing the proposal was held in Niamey a few days later. On 30 December 20 non-governmental organizations and unions, including the Democratic Confederation of Workers of Niger (CDTN), formed the United Front for the Safeguarding of Democratic Gains (FUSAD) in opposition to the extension proposal, and they called on Tandja—who had up to that point expressed no opinion on the matter in public—to speak out against the proposal.

The relationship with the French nuclear company Areva, which had enjoyed a de facto four decade monopoly in the country, worsened under Tandja as he sought to curb the power of French influence by striking a deal with the China Nuclear International Uranium Corporation in 2007 to develop a uranium mine, resulting in competition for Areva.

== 2009 constitutional crisis ==
In the run-up to the 2009 elections (presidential, Assembly, and municipal), a movement to draft President Tandja for a third term appeared. Led by public figures of the MNSD outside government, the group took the name of Tandja's 2004 re-election slogan, Tazartché: a Hausa word meaning "Continuity". Through several well funded and well attended public rallies in late 2008, the President remained silent on the calls for him to remain. The 1999 constitution not only limited the president to two terms (article 36), but explicitly barred amending this provision by any means (article 136). Prime Minister Seyni Oumarou reiterated on 22 January that all scheduled elections would go ahead before the end of 2009. In March, during his meetings with French President Sarkozy, Tandja explicitly stated that he would not seek a third term.

Then, in early May 2009, when questioned by the press on his visit to Agadez to begin peace talks with Tuareg rebels, Tandja announced he would seek a third term, saying. "The people have demanded I remain; I cannot ignore their call." His spokesman then outlined a plan in which a referendum could be held in mid-2009, not to amend the 1999 constitution, but to scrap it and begin work on a constitution of the Sixth Republic of Niger, which would contain no term limits for the President, and create a fully presidential republic.

On 15 May 2009, in response to their parties' opposition to a proposed referendum to allow the President to seek a third term, the three members of RDP-Jama'a and ANDP-Zaman Lahiya were replaced with ministers drawn from the MNSD-Nassara. With the continued support of the CDS, the MNSD maintained a working majority of 67 seats in the 113-seat National Assembly.

According to the 1999 Constitution of Niger, the President may call a referendum on any matter (except for a revision of those elements of the Constitution outlined in Article 136—including the presidential term limits). The Constitutional Court of Niger and the National Assembly of Niger must advise the president, but there is no provision that the president must heed their advice. On 25 May 2009, the Constitutional Court, made up of appointed judges, released a ruling that any referendum to create a new constitution would not only be unconstitutional, but would violate the oath Tandja had sworn on the Qur'an (a serious matter in this overwhelmingly Muslim country). The week prior, two major parties had come out in their opposition to the referendum proposal as well. On 13 May, the ANDP-Zaman Lahiya, led by Moumouni Adamou Djermakoye, declared its opposition to any change in the constitution. On 15 May the CDS-Rahama, the party without which the MNSD could not have formed governments in 1999, 2004, and 2007, came out opposing the referendum, and calling the constitution unalterable. Neither party moved into the opposition, and both Ousmane and Djermokoye said they were willing to negotiate with the president.

On 26 May, within hours of the Constitutional Court's statement, official media read out a statement that Tandja had dissolved the National Assembly. Under the 1999 Constitution he is allowed to do this once every two years, but he must call parliamentary elections within three months. This would mean the government of Niger would carry out scheduled parliamentary elections in September, two months early, and a referendum on a new constitution before presidential elections which could have been held no later than December, assuming the 1999 constitution was in effect.

Following a ruling by the Constitutional Court, this time binding, that the referendum could not go ahead, the President released a statement on 21 June saying he would forgo the referendum, at least for the near future. But on 24 June he released a further statement, demanding the court reverse its ruling. This was immediately (the 25th) followed by a previously postponed one day general strike by seven labor confederations, and the abandonment of his government by the CDS-Rahama party of Mahamane Ousmane.

On 27 June, President Tandja announced he was suspending the government and would rule by decree. On 27 June, the leader of the main opposition party, Mahamadou Issoufou, denounced what he called a coup, and called on Nigeriens to resist by all legal means, citing Article 13 of the 1999 Constitution which mandates officials to ignore "manifestly illegal orders".

== February 2010 coup ==
On 18 February 2010, during a government meeting at the presidential palace, rebel soldiers attacked and deposed Tandja in a coup d'état, establishing a military junta called the Supreme Council for the Restoration of Democracy (CSRD). Tandja was believed to be held at a military barracks on the outskirts of Niamey.

The junta kept Tandja in detention while it organized a political transition. He was held under house arrest and then moved to a prison in January 2011. Tandja's mother, having reached a very advanced age, died in March 2011.

The junta held elections in 2011, which were won by Issoufou, who led the opposition to Tandja during the 10 years of the latter's presidency. The transition ended with Issoufou taking office in April 2011. A month later, the Niamey Court of Appeal threw out all of the legal charges against Tandja, and he was released on 10 May 2011. MNSD officials, including party leader Seyni Oumarou, promptly went to his home to greet and congratulate him, but it was not immediately clear whether he planned to return to active politics.

== Illness and death ==
Tandja suffered from an illness in his final years and travelled to France, Germany and Morocco for medical treatment. He died on 24 November 2020 in Niamey at the age of 82.

Political offices
Preceded by Daouda Malam Wanké	President of Niger; 1999–2010	Succeeded by Salou Djibo as President of the Supreme Council for the Restoration of Democracy of Niger
Diplomatic posts
Preceded by John Kufuor	Chairperson of the Economic Community of West African States; 2005–2007	Succeeded by Blaise Compaoré
