= Ibrahim Baré Maïnassara =

Military leader of Niger from 1996 to 1999

- Maïnassara, c. 1996–1999

5th President of Niger (Note: (to 7 August 1996, as President of the National Salvation Council of Niger))
- In office 27 January 1996 – 9 April 1999
- Prime Minister: Boukary Adji; Amadou Cissé; Ibrahim Hassane Mayaki
- Vice President: Youssoufa Maïga
- Preceded by: Mahamane Ousmane
- Succeeded by: Daouda Malam Wanké

Personal details
- Born: 9 May 1949 Dogondoutchi, Colony of Niger
- Died: 9 April 1999 (aged 49) Niamey, Niger
- Cause of death: Assassination (gunshot wounds)
- Party: RDP–Jama'a (1997–99)
- Other political affiliations: UNIRD (1996–97)
- Spouse: Clémence Aïssa Baré

Military service
- Allegiance: Niger
- Branch/service: Niger Army
- Years of service: 1970–1996
- Rank: Colonel

General Ibrahim Baré Maïnassara (9 May 1949 – 9 April 1999) was a Nigerien military officer and diplomat who ruled Niger from 1996 until his assassination in 1999. He seized and lost power in military coups.

Baré Maïnassara, a Maouri, a subgroup of Niger's Hausa ethnic majority, was born in Dogondoutchi in 1949 and pursued a military career. Maïnassara was named Army Chief of Staff in March 1995, under a constitution that had moved Niger from prolonged military rule in 1991. He seized power on 27 January 1996, and ruled Niger until his assassination on 9 April 1999, during a second coup d'état.

== Seizure of power ==
Parliamentary elections in January 1995 resulted in cohabitation between President Mahamane Ousmane and a parliament controlled by his opponents, led by Prime Minister Hama Amadou.

Rivalry between Ousmane and Amadou effectively paralyzed the government, and Maïnassara seized power on 27 January 1996, pointing to the difficult political situation as justification.

== Rule ==
Under Maïnassara's rule, a new constitution was approved by referendum in May 1996, and a presidential election was held on 7–8 July 1996. Maïnassara took about 52% of the vote, in an election widely viewed as fraudulent. On the second day of polling, he had the electoral commission dissolved and replaced it with another electoral commission; on the same day, he also had the four opposition candidates placed under house arrest, which lasted for two weeks. Maïnassara was sworn in on 7 August.

He imposed conservative Islamist laws that included the banning of short skirts and a crackdown on the sale of contraceptives, while also introducing economic reforms and signing an agreement with the International Monetary Fund. However, the country's economic problems continued and its external debt rose to $1.4 billion. This led to strikes by teachers and civil servants over pay arrears and job losses and a near-mutiny by the army in February 1998 over unpaid salaries.

The National Union of Independents for Democratic Renewal (UNIRD) was established in 1996 to support Maïnassara in that year's elections, but subsequently, the Rally for Democracy and Progress-Jama'a was established as the ruling party. With the constitution barring presidents from leading parties, Hamid Algabid became the leader of the RDP-Jama'a in August 1997.

Local elections were held in February 1999, and in early April the Supreme Court released results which showed the opposition winning more seats than Maïnassara's supporters; the Court also canceled the results in many areas and ordered elections there to be held again. The opposition called for protests against the cancellation of results on 8 April.

== Death ==
On 9 April 1999, in a second coup d'état, Maïnassara was ambushed and shot to death by soldiers, reportedly members of the Presidential Guard, at the airport in the capital city of Niamey as he was going to board a helicopter. The circumstances of the killing were not clear; rumors suggested that Maïnassara was attempting to flee the country. Initially his death was officially described as an "unfortunate accident", but this claim was widely considered implausible. Coup leader Daouda Malam Wanké succeeded him as head of state and initiated a political transition that ended with elections late in the year.

The constitution adopted in a July 1999 referendum provides for an amnesty for participants in both the 1996 and 1999 coups. An investigation into Maïnassara's death had begun in June 1999, but following the amnesty, it ended in September. The RDP-Jama'a has demanded an international inquiry into his death in the years since. His widow, Clémence Aïssa Baré, and their children have campaigned for the prosecution of his killers in Niger and before the ECOWAS Court for more than 20 years.

== Notes ==
Preceded by Mahamane Ousmane	President of Niger; 1996–1999	Succeeded by Daouda Malam Wanké
