= List of political parties in Niger =

This article lists political parties in Niger.

Before 2023, Niger had a multi-party political system, characterized by two to three dominant parties and several smaller ones that were often electorally successful enough to gain seats in the National Assembly. These smaller parties frequently formed electoral coalitions with more powerful parties, creating blocs both in government and in opposition.

However, since a military coup in 2023, Niger has been governed by a military junta led by General Abdourahamane Tiani. In a significant escalation, all political parties were officially banned and dissolved by decree in March 2025. As a result, the country's multi-party democratic framework has been dismantled, and political activity outside the control of the ruling junta is no longer permitted.

== Party naming ==
Nigerien political parties are commonly known both by their acronyms and a nickname. The latter tradition began prior to independence with the Nigerien Democratic Union-Sawaba. Sawaba ("Freedom" in Hausa) became the most common name of the party. Today all large parties have an official "nickname", usually in Hausa, Djerma or other national languages, while the official party name is in French.

== Multi-party democracy ==
Niger banned all opposition parties from 1959 (prior to independence) to 1991. During the First Republic (1960–1974), the PPN-RDA was the sole party. From 1987 to 1991, MNSD-Nassara was the only legal party. Both parties survive in somewhat altered forms.

== Historical parties ==
=== Parties that were represented in parliament of 2021 until 2023 ===
| Party | Abbr. | Leader | Political position | Ideology | Assembly | Years active |
|---|---|---|---|---|---|---|
| Nigerien Party for Democracy and Socialism; Parti nigérien pour la démocratie et le socialisme | PNDS–Tarayya | Mahamadou Issoufou | Centre-left | Social democracy Democratic socialism | 79 / 171 | 1990–2025 |
| Nigerien Democratic Movement for an African Federation; Mouvement démocratique nigérien pour une fédération africaine | MODEN/FA–Lumana | Hama Amadou | Centre-right | Islamic democracy Pan-Africanism | 19 / 171 | 2009–2025 |
| Patriotic Movement for the Republic; Mouvement patriotique pour la république | MPR–Jamuhria | Albadé Abouba | Centre-right | | 14 / 171 | 2015–2025 |
| National Movement for the Society of Development; Mouvement national pour la société de développement | MNSD–Nassara | Seyni Oumarou | Centre-right | Conservatism; Liberalism; Economic liberalism | 13 / 171 | 1989–2025 |
| Democratic and Republican Renewal; Renouveau démocratique et républicain | RDR–Tchandji | Mahamane Ousmane | | | 7 / 171 | 2020–2025 |
| Congress for the Republic; Congrès pour la République | CPR–Inganci | Kassoum Moctar | | | 8 / 171 | 2014–2025 |
| Nigerien Patriotic Movement; Mouvement patriotique nigérien | MPN–Kiishin Kassa | Ibrahim Yacouba | | | 6 / 171 | 2015–2025 |
| Peace, Justice, Progress; Paix justice progrès–Génération Doubara | PJP–Génération Doubara | Salou Djibo | | | 2 / 171 | 2020–2025 |
| Nigerien Alliance for Democracy and Progress; Alliance nigérienne pour la démocratie et le progrès | ANDP–Zaman Lahiya | Moussa Hassane Barazé | | Progressivism | 3 / 171 | 1992–2025 |
| Rally for Democracy and Progress; Rassemblement pour la démocratie et le progrès | RDP–Jama'a | Hamid Algabid | | Progressive conservatism | 2 / 171 | 1997–2025 |
| Rally for Peace and Progress; Rassemblement pour la paix et le progrès | RPP–Farrilla | Oumarou Malam Alma | | | 2 / 171 | 2020–2025 |
| Alliance for Democratic Renewal; Alliance pour le renouveau démocratique | ARD–Adaltchi Mutuntchi | Laouan Magagi | | | 2 / 171 | 2010–2025 |
| Alliance of Movements for the Emergence of Niger; Alliance des mouvements pour l’émergence du Niger | AMEN–AMIN | Omar Hamidou Tchiana | | | 2 / 171 | 2015–2025 |
| Democratic Movement for the Emergence of Niger; Mouvement démocratique pour l'émergence du Niger | MDEN–Falala | Tidjani Abdoulkadri | | | 2 / 171 | 2020–2025 |
| Social Democratic Rally; Rassemblement social-démocrate | RSD–Gaskiya | Amadou Cheiffou | Centre-left | Social democracy | 1 / 171 | 2004–2025 |
| Democratic Alternation for Equity in Niger; Alternance démocratique pour l'équité au Niger | ADEN–Karkaraa | Ousmane Amadou | | | 1 / 171 | 2019–2025 |
| Social Democratic Party; Parti social-démocrate | PSD–Bassira | Sanoussi Mareini | Centre-left | Social democracy | 1 / 171 | 2015–2025 |
| Alliance for Democracy and the Republic; Alliance pour la démocratie et la république | ADR–Mahita | Ousmane Idi Ango | | | 1 / 171 | 2020–2025 |
| Nigerien Rally for Democracy and Peace; Rassemblement nigérien pour la démocratie et la paix | RNDP–Aneima Banizoumbou | Mounkaïla Issa | | | 1 / 171 | 2019–2025 |

=== Smaller contemporary parties ===
| Party | Abbr. | Leader | Ideology | Political positions | Years active |
|---|---|---|---|---|---|
| Nigerien Self-Management Party; Parti Nigérien pour l’Autogestion-Al'ouma | PNA-Al'ouma | Sanoussi Jackou | Conservatism | | 1997–2025 |
| Republican Party for Liberty and Progress–Nakowa | PRLPN-Nakowa | | | | |
| Party for Socialism and Democracy in Niger; Parti pour le socialisme et la démocratie au Niger-Alheri | PSDN-Alheri | Issaka Labo | Social democracy Democratic socialism | Centre-left | 1992–2025 |
| Union for Democracy and Social Progress; Union pour la Démocratie et le Progrès Social | UDPS-Amana | | | Centrism | 1990–2025 |
| Union for Democracy and the Republic; Union pour la Démocratie et la République-Tabbat | UDR-Tabbat | | | | |
| Union of Independent Nigeriens; Union des Nigériens Indépendants | UNI | | | | 1999–2025 |
| Union of Democratic and Progressive Patriots–Chamoua | UPDP-Chamoua | | | Centrism | 1999–2025 |
| Nigerien Development Party | | | | | |

=== Previously dominant parties ===
| Party | Abbr. | Est. | Disb. | Leader | Ideology | Political positions |
|---|---|---|---|---|---|---|
| Democratic and Social Convention; Convention démocratique et sociale-Rahama | CDS-Rahama | 1991 | 2025 | Abdou Labo | Social democracy | Centre to Centre-left |
| Nigerien Progressive Party – African Democratic Rally; Parti Progressiste Nigérien-Rassemblement Démocratique Nigerien | PPN-RDA | 1946 (first); 1992 (second) | 1974 (first); 2025 (second) | Hamani Diori; Abdoulaye Hamani Diori | African nationalism; Pan-Africanism; Traditionalism; Nationalism; Anti-economic liberalism; Anti-collectivism | Big Tent |
| Union of Popular Forces for Democracy and Progress | UDFP-Sawaba | 1954 | 2025 | Djibo Bakary | Socialism; Marxism (until 1991); Hausa interests; Maoism (1960s-1970s); Social democracy (from 1991) | Left-wing (1954-1959); Far-left (1959-1991); Centre-left (1991-2025) |
| Nigerien Action Bloc | BNA | 1955 | 1956 | Issoufou Saidou-Djermakoye | | |
| Union of Nigerien Independents and Sympathisers | UNIS | 1948 | 1957 | Georges Condat (1948-1953); Ikhia Zodi (1953-1957) | Conservatism | |
| Party of Independents, Niger–East; Parti Independent du Niger-Est | PINE | | | | | |
| Nigerien Democratic Front | FDN | 1956 | 1958 | Ikhia Zodi | | |

=== Coalitions ===
- Alliance of the Forces of Change (AFC): a nine (later six) party coalition from 1991 to 1996. Ruling coalition from 1993 to 1994.
- Union for the Franco-African Community (UCFA): PPN led pro-French Union coalition: 1958.
- Coordination of Democratic Forces (CFD, Coordination des forces démocratiques): 11 party opposition coalition from 2004. Led by PNDS. Included PPN, PNA-Al'ouma, UNI, UDR-Tabbat.

== See also ==
- Politics of Niger
- List of political parties by country
