= 2020–21 Nigerien general election =

- 27 December 2020 (first round); 21 February 2021 (second round)
- Presidential election
- Registered: 7,446,556
- Turnout: 69.68% (first round); 62.91% (second round)
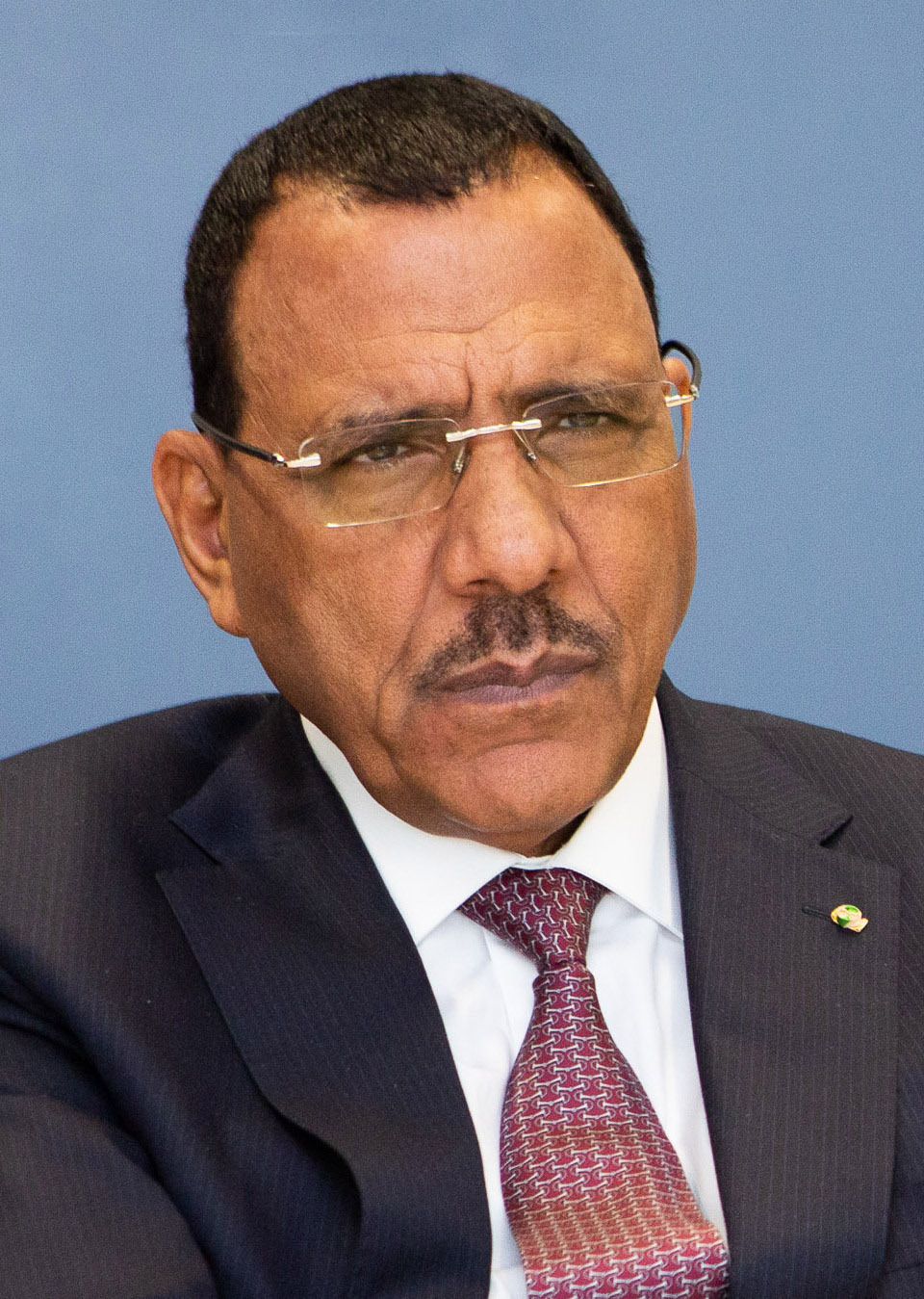

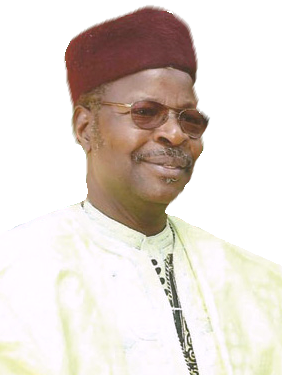
Nominee	Mohamed Bazoum	Mahamane Ousmane
Party	PNDS	RDR
Popular vote	2,490,049	1,983,072
Percentage	55.67%	44.33%
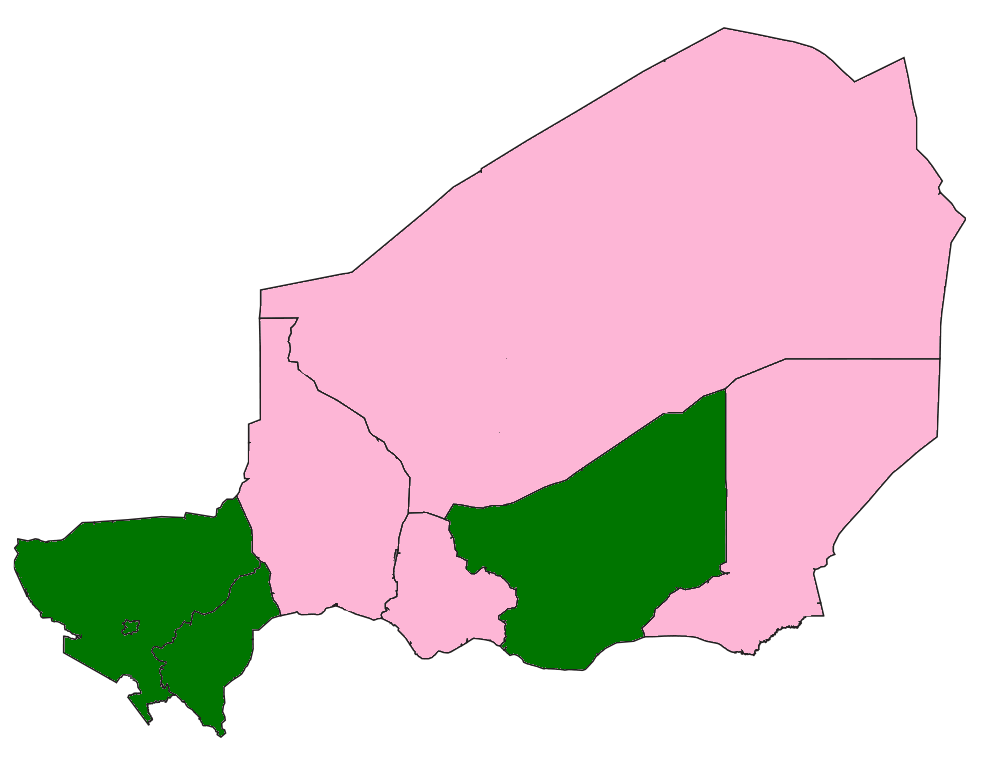
- Second round results by region
President before election
Mahamadou Issoufou
PNDS
Elected President
Mohamed Bazoum
PNDS
- Legislative election
- All 171 seats in the National Assembly; 86 seats needed for a majority
- Turnout: 69.19% (▲2.79pp)
Party	Leader	Vote %	Seats	+/–
PNDS	Mohamed Bazoum	37.04	79	+4
MODEN/FA	Hama Amadou	8.71	19	−6
MPR-Jamhuriya	Albadé Abouba	7.59	14	+1
MNSD	Seyni Oumarou	6.77	13	−7
CPR-Inganci	Kassoum Moctar	4.15	8	+5
RDR	Mahamane Ousmane	4.41	7	New
MPN-KIISHIN	Ibrahim Yacouba	3.97	6	+1
ANDP-Zaman Lahiya	Moussa Hassane Barazé	2.46	3	−1
PJP	Salou Djibo	2.88	2	New
RDP-Jama'a	Hamid Algabid	2.13	2	−1
RPP	Oumarou Malam Alma	2.10	2	New
ARD Adaltchi-Mutuntchi	Ousmane Issoufou Oubandawaki	1.74	2	0
AMEN AMIN	Oumarou Hamidou Tchiana	1.43	2	−1
MDEN-Falala	Tidjani Abdoulkadri	1.42	2	New
RSD-Gaskiya	Amadou Cheiffou	1.03	1	−3
ADEN-Karkaraa	Ousmane Adamou	1.02	1	New
PSD-Bassira	Ibrahim Kasso	0.97	1	−1
ADR-Mahita	Ibrahim Idi Ango Ousmane	0.88	1	New
RNDP-Aneima Banizoumbou	Mounkaila Issa	0.66	1	New
This lists parties that won seats. See the complete results below.
Prime Minister before	Prime Minister after
Brigi Rafini; PNDS	Ouhoumoudou Mahamadou; PNDS

General elections were held in Niger on 27 December 2020 to elect the President and National Assembly. With incumbent president Mahamadou Issoufou stepping down after reaching his constitutional two-term limit, new presidential candidates contested the office. As no candidate received a majority in the first round, a second round was held on 21 February 2021. The ruling Nigerien Party for Democracy and Socialism (PNDS) candidate Mohamed Bazoum was declared the winner, defeating Mahamane Ousmane in the second round with 55.67% of the vote. In the National Assembly elections, the PNDS won 79 of the 166 seats, falling short of a majority.

== Background ==
Incumbent president Mahamadou Issoufou completed his second term in 2021 and publicly committed to stepping down, paving the way for the country's first peaceful transition of power since independence. A record 41 candidates applied to run for president; however, only 30 were accepted. Among the 11 rejected candidates was Hama Amadou, candidate of the main opposition party. His application was denied by the constitutional court due to his previous imprisonment for a year in a case related to baby trafficking. Amadou, who came second in the 2016 and third in the 2011 elections, has denied all the charges and claimed they were politically motivated.

== Electoral system ==
The president is elected using the two-round system; if no candidate receives a majority of the vote in the first round, a second round is held. For this election, the second round was held on 21 February 2021.

The 171 members of the National Assembly are elected by two methods. 158 members are elected from eight multi-member constituencies based on the seven regions and Niamey using party-list proportional representation. Another eight seats are reserved for minority groups and are elected from single-member constituencies using first-past-the-post voting. Normally, five seats (one for each permanently inhabited continent) are reserved for Nigeriens living abroad, all elected from single-member constituencies using first-past-the-post voting. However, in the months preceding the election, the registered voters list for Nigeriens living abroad was not kept up to date, resulting in the elections for these five seats not being held. This de facto lowered the total number of seats in the chamber to 166 and the number needed for a majority to 84.

== Results ==
=== President ===
Candidate	Party	First round		Second round	
Candidate	Party	Votes	%	Votes	%
Mohamed Bazoum	Nigerien Party for Democracy and Socialism	1,879,629	39.30	2,490,049	55.67
Mahamane Ousmane	Democratic and Republican Renewal	812,412	16.99	1,983,072	44.33
Seyni Oumarou	National Movement for the Society of Development	428,083	8.95		
Albadé Abouba	Patriotic Movement for the Republic	338,511	7.08		
Ibrahim Yacouba	Nigerien Patriotic Movement	257,302	5.38		
Salou Djibo	Peace, Justice, Progress – Generation Doubara	142,747	2.98		
Oumarou Malam Alma	Rally for Peace and Progress	118,259	2.47		
Hassane Baraze Moussa	Nigerien Alliance for Democracy and Progress	114,965	2.40		
Omar Hamidou Tchana	Alliance of Movements for the Emergence of Niger	76,368	1.60		
Amadou Ousmane	Democratic Alternation for Fairness in Niger	63,396	1.33		
Souleymane Garba	Niger Party of Change – Mu Lura	61,158	1.28		
Idi Ango Ousmane	Alliance for Democracy and the Republic – Mahita	56,100	1.17		
Nayoussa Nassirou	Convention for Democracy and Social Progress	41,697	0.87		
Ibrahim Gado	Republican Council for Progress and Democracy	39,319	0.82		
Mounkaila Issa	Nigerien Rally for Democracy and Peace	38,604	0.81		
Hamidou Mamadou Abdou	African National Gathering Party	35,934	0.75		
Intinicar Alhassane	Nigerien Party for Peace and Development	30,995	0.65		
Abdoulkadri Alpha	Gayya Zabbe	28,910	0.60		
Kane Habibou	Synergy of Democrats for the Republic	27,162	0.57		
Oumarou Abdourahamane	Union for Patriotic Pan-Africanists	20,488	0.43		
Moustapha Moustapha	Party for a Political Revolution in Niger	20,365	0.43		
Amadou Saidou	Independent	20,156	0.42		
Mahaman Hamissou Moumouni	Party for Justice and Development – Hakika	18,585	0.39		
Djibrilla Mainassara	Sawaba	17,233	0.36		
Sagbo Adolphe	Socialist Party	17,060	0.36		
Idrissa Issoufou	Citizen's Movement for Development	16,995	0.36		
Amadou Cissé	Union for Democracy and the Republic	16,835	0.35		
Mamadou Doulla	Redemption for the Sake of the Fatherland	16,768	0.35		
Abdallah Souleymane	Niger Forward (Nigerena)	14,282	0.30		
Ismael Ide	Action Front for a New Niger	12,062	0.25		
Total		4,782,380	100.00	4,473,121	100.00
Valid votes		4,782,380	92.16	4,473,121	95.48
Invalid/blank votes		406,752	7.84	211,658	4.52
Total votes		5,189,132	100.00	4,684,779	100.00
Registered voters/turnout		7,446,556	69.68	7,446,556	62.91
Source: Constitutional Court - First round, Constitutional Court - Second round

The first round of the election resulted in Mohamed Bazoum leading with 39.30% of the vote, while former president Mahamane Ousmane came second with 16.99%. Consequently, a second round was held between them on February 21 to determine the next president. On 23 February, the Independent National Electoral Commission (CÉNI) announced that Mohamed Bazoum, former interior minister and candidate of the ruling party, had won the second round with 55.67% of the valid votes. "These results are provisional and must be submitted to the Constitutional Court for analysis," stated Issaka Souna, president of the CÉNI, before the diplomatic corps and Nigerien authorities gathered at the Niamey convention center.

=== National Assembly ===
Due to the registered voters list for Nigeriens living abroad not being kept up to date, elections for five overseas seats were not held, lowering the total number of seats to 166.

The Nigerien Party for Democracy and Socialism won 79 seats. MODEN FA came second with 19 seats, the MPR third with 14 seats, and the MNSD fourth with 13 seats. The remaining seats were taken by smaller or minor parties.

Party	Votes	%	Seats	+/–
Nigerien Party for Democracy and Socialism	1,745,266	37.04	79	+4
Nigerien Democratic Movement for an African Federation	410,311	8.71	19	−6
Patriotic Movement for the Republic	357,563	7.59	14	+1
National Movement for the Society of Development	319,189	6.77	13	−7
Democratic and Republican Renewal	207,592	4.41	7	New
Congress for the Republic	195,704	4.15	8	+5
Nigerien Patriotic Movement	187,005	3.97	6	+1
Peace, Justice, Progress–Generation Doubara	135,576	2.88	2	New
Nigerien Alliance for Democracy and Progress	115,815	2.46	3	−1
Rally for Democracy and Progress	100,363	2.13	2	−1
Rally for Peace and Progress	99,043	2.10	2	New
Alliance for Democratic Renewal	82,073	1.74	2	0
Alliance of Movements for the Emergence of Niger	67,354	1.43	2	−1
Democratic Movement for the Emergence of Niger	67,108	1.42	2	New
Democratic Alliance for Niger	53,287	1.13	0	−1
Democratic and Social Convention	50,892	1.08	0	−3
Social Democratic Rally	48,368	1.03	1	−3
Democratic Alternation for Equity in Niger	48,012	1.02	1	New
Social Democratic Party	45,777	0.97	1	−1
Alliance for Democracy and the Republic	41,306	0.88	1	New
Nigerien Rally for Democracy and Peace	30,971	0.66	1	New
Democratic Renewal	26,560	0.56	0	New
African National Rally	23,980	0.51	0	New
Republican Council for Progress and Democracy	18,319	0.39	0	New
Nigerien Party for Reform	16,956	0.36	0	New
Civic Movement for Reform	16,708	0.35	0	New
Synergy of Democrats for the Republic	16,526	0.35	0	New
New Generation for Niger	11,434	0.24	0	0
Nigerien Progressive Party – African Democratic Rally	9,053	0.19	0	0
Rally of Citizens for the Republic	8,972	0.19	0	New
Rally of Patriots for Development	8,770	0.19	0	New
Democratic Movement for Renewal	8,491	0.18	0	0
Union for Democratic Renewal	8,254	0.18	0	New
Patriotic Movement for Democracy and Development	7,670	0.16	0	New
Movement of People for Progress	7,560	0.16	0	New
National Convention for the Republic	6,796	0.14	0	New
Alliance of Patriots for Progress	6,706	0.14	0	New
Alliance for Democracy and Development	6,705	0.14	0	New
Union for Democracy and the Republic	6,667	0.14	0	−2
Party for Justice and Development	6,248	0.13	0	New
Democratic Party of the People	6,192	0.13	0	New
Party of Energetic Youth of Niger	5,073	0.11	0	New
Nigerien Alliance for Democracy and Development	5,061	0.11	0	New
Socialist Party	4,962	0.11	0	0
Democratic Movement for Development and Defence of Freedoms	4,703	0.10	0	New
African Awakening – Yunkuri	3,972	0.08	0	New
Steps of Patriots for National Progress	3,900	0.08	0	New
Party of the Masses for Labour	3,486	0.07	0	New
Gayye Zabbe	3,311	0.07	0	New
Action Front for a New Niger	3,308	0.07	0	New
Movement for Justice, Democracy and Development	3,264	0.07	0	New
Socialist Democratic Rally	3,014	0.06	0	New
Republican Party for Democracy and Development	2,720	0.06	0	New
Redemption for the Salvation of the Fatherland	2,542	0.05	0	New
Socio-Revolutionary Movement for Democracy	2,522	0.05	0	0
Democratic and Socialist Union for Renewal	2,516	0.05	0	New
Rally of Democrats	2,480	0.05	0	New
Daraja	2,298	0.05	0	New
All for the Republic	2,056	0.04	0	New
Converge of Patriots for Reform	1,993	0.04	0	New
Union of Socialist Nigeriens	1,877	0.04	0	0
Alliance for Democracy and Progress	1,865	0.04	0	New
Sawaba	1,647	0.03	0	New
Nigerien Self-Management Party	1,217	0.03	0	0
Union of Nigerien Patriots for Renewal	1,046	0.02	0	New
Party of Renewal and Equity	1,045	0.02	0	New
Nigerien Convergence for Progress	628	0.01	0	New
Convention for Democracy and Social Progress	588	0.01	0	New
Patriotic Movement for Salvation	563	0.01	0	New
Nigerien Party for Peace and Development	374	0.01	0	New
Party of Progress for a United Niger	350	0.01	0	New
Force of Hope	292	0.01	0	New
APPAD	216	0.00	0	New
Union of Independent Nigeriens	196	0.00	0	0
Nigerien Party for Democracy and Development	94	0.00	0	New
Patriotic Front for Justice and Development	45	0.00	0	New
Niger Forward	27	0.00	0	New
Union of Patriots for Democracy and Progress	23	0.00	0	New
Independents	17	0.00	0	0
Total	4,712,433	100.00	166	−5
Valid votes	4,712,433	91.46		
Invalid/blank votes	440,194	8.54		
Total votes	5,152,627	100.00		
Registered voters/turnout	7,446,556	69.19		
Source: Constitutional Court

== Aftermath ==
Following the elections, protesters demanded the government's resignation and a recount of the results. Two people were killed during the demonstrations on 25–26 February when police fired tear gas at protesters. Protesters threw stones at soldiers in military vehicles who patrolled and clashed with demonstrators in Niamey. Protests lasted for three days, beginning on 23 February.

On 31 March 2021, a a coup attempt was launched by dissident soldiers two days before Bazoum's inauguration. It was thwarted, and the inauguration proceeded on 2 April.

In July 2023, Bazoum was deposed from office after a coup d'état led by members of the presidential guard and the armed forces.
