= Adamou =

Adamou is both a given name and a surname. Notable people with the name include:

Surname:

- Adamos Adamou (born 1950), Cypriot politician and Member of the European Parliament for the Progressive Party of Working People
- Chaibou Adamou, player from Cameroon who currently plays in the Thai Division 2 League for Pattani FC
- Dimitrios Adamou (1914–1991), Greek politician and a writer, Member of the European Parliament representing Greece for the Communist Party
- Ivi Adamou (born 1993), Cypriot singer
- Korina Adamou (born 2002), Cypriot footballer
- Nabil Adamou (born 1975), retired Algerian long jumper

Given name:

- Adamou Allassane, Nigerien Olympic middle-distance runner
- Adamou Harouna, Nigerian military figure, led the military coup which overthrew President Mamadou Tandja in 2010
- Adamou Idé (born 1951), Nigerien poet and novelist
- Adamou Mayaki (1919–2003), Nigerian politician and diplomat
- Adamou Moussa (born 1995), Nigerien international footballer
- Adamou Ndam Njoya (1942–2020), Cameroonian lawyer, author, professor, politician, and former presidential candidate
- Frederic Adamou Ngove (born 1988), professional Cameroonian footballer currently playing for ES Hammam-Sousse
- Moumouni Adamou Djermakoye (born 1939), Nigerian politician and the President of the Nigerian Alliance for Democracy and Progress
