= Mohamed Boucha =

Nigerien politician (1966–2021)

Deputy Minister of Agriculture for Livestock
- In office 11 April 2016 – 29 June 2020
- Succeeded by: Ali Gonki

Minister of Employment, Labor and Social Protection
- In office 29 June 2020 – 7 April 2021
- Preceded by: Mohamed Ben Omar

Personal details
- Born: 1966 Tiguindan Adar, Niger
- Died: 24 June 2021 (aged 54–55) Niamey, Niger
- Party: MNSD-Nassara; MPR-Jamhuriya

Mohamed Boucha (1966 – 24 June 2021) was a Nigerien politician.

== Biography ==
Boucha attended secondary school in Agadez, where he graduated in 1985. He attended the École nationale d'administration et de magistrature in Niamey from 1990 to 1993, where he studied business administration and accounting. He earned a master's degree in management from the University of Ouagadougou in 2011.

Boucha worked as an accountant and trainer for the Niger Armed Forces from 1987 to 2002. He then started his own accounting business in Agadez. From 2003 to 2007, he worked for the United Nations Development Programme, where he was a branch manager for the integration of former paramilitary fighters in northern Niger. From 2012 to 2013, he worked for the United States Agency for International Development as a coordinator responsible for the Agadez region.

Boucha began his political career as a member of the National Movement for the Development of Society (MNSD-Nassara), for which he stood in the 2011 election as a substitute for Hamed Haïdara Ag Elgafiat in the Agadez region. He served in several roles in the government of President Mahamadou Issoufou and Prime Minister Brigi Rafini. On 13 August 2013, he became Minister Delegate for the Budget. On 4 June 2015, he was assigned to advise Minister for Economic Affairs and Finance Saïdou Sidibé. That year, he joined the Patriotic Movement for the Republic (MPR-Jamhuriya), led by Albadé Abouba.

On 11 April 2016, Boucha was appointed Deputy Minister of Agriculture for Livestock under Albadé Abouba. In 2020, he co-founded the Rally for Peace and Progress alongside Oumarou Alma, for which he first served as treasurer. The rise of the party led to a dispute between Boucha and Abouba, rendering progress between the two impossible.

Following the death of Minister of Employment, Labor and Social Protection Mohamed Ben Omar, Boucha succeeded him. Ali Gonki of the Social Democratic Party succeeded him as Deputy Minister for Livestock. On 4 December 2020, Boucha also became interim Minister of Post, Telecommunications and E-Business following the departure of fellow party member Sani Maïgochi to run for the National Assembly.

Boucha left the government on 7 April 2021. On 10 May 2021, President Mohamed Bazoum appointed Boucha to be his special advisor.

Mohamed Boucha died in Niamey on 24 June 2021 following a brief illness.
