= Issa Lamine =

Nigerien politician

Issa Lamine is a Nigerien politician. He led the Toubou-based Front Democratique Revolutionnaire, one of several rebel groups operating in the far north and east of Niger in the late 1990s. Lamine entered government as a representative of the eastern town of N'Gourti in 2000. As a member of the Democratic and Social Convention (CDS-Rahama), he was a Deputy in the National Assembly of Niger and then served in the government of Niger as Minister of Public Health from 2007 to 2009. He left the CDS-Rahama in 2009 and was elected to the National Assembly as an independent candidate.

== Rebel leader ==
In the late 1990s, Lamine was "Head of External Affairs", later overall leader, of the Toubou-based Front Democratique Revolutionnaire rebel movement active in the southern part of the Kaouar region.

== Political leader ==
Following the 1999 coup and return to civilian rule, Lamine became political leader from his base in N'Gourti, and from 5 January 2000 served as Minister in a series of governments. He was named Nigerien Minister of Youth and Sport in the first government of the Nigerien Fifth Republic, keeping this portfolio through a change in personnel on 17 September 2001. Lamine served in this second government, also under MNSD-Nassara Prime Minister Hama Amadou, until 9 November 2002. Both these appointments were as an independent, represented officially as leader of the former rebel FDR.

Lamine was elected to the National Assembly as a CDS candidate in the December 2004 parliamentary election, and during the parliamentary term that followed he served as Vice-President of the Foreign Affairs Commission.

== Minister of Health ==
Later, he was appointed to the government as Minister of Public Health on 9 June 2007. In July 2008, following international condemnation of malnutrition and famine in the Maradi Region, Minister of Health Issa Lamine had Doctors Without Borders (MSF-France) teams treating malnourished children ejected from the country, accusing the MSF of giving "false" malnutrition statistics exaggerating starvation to stimulate funding.

Lamine opened a center for continuing education about the disease noma, which was funded by a non-governmental organization, in Niamey on 23 January 2009. On that occasion, he credited the non-governmental organizations Sentinelles, Campaner, and Hilfsaktion for their work combating the disease in different parts of Niger.

== 2009-2011 political crisis ==
After the CDS chose to withdraw from the government to protest President Mamadou Tandja's plans for a constitutional referendum, Lamine and the other CDS ministers were replaced on 29 June 2009. When the CDS decided to boycott the October 2009 parliamentary election, along with the other major opposition parties, Lamine ignored the boycott and stood as an independent candidate in N'Gourti, which was considered his electoral stronghold. He won a seat in the National Assembly, and when the National Assembly began meeting for the new parliamentary term in November 2009, he joined the nine-member Independent Parliamentary Group, which was composed of independents and deputies from small parties. He was also chosen as President of the General and Institutional Affairs Commission, one of the National Assembly's seven standing committees, at that time.

In February 2010, the military seized power in a coup d'état, dissolving the National Assembly after it had been sitting for only three months. Lamine thus lost his parliamentary seat, but he was appointed as Special Adviser to the President of the Supreme Council for the Restoration of Democracy, Salou Djibo, in March 2010; he was also given the rank of minister. Following the January 2011 parliamentary election, Issa was accused by local military governors in N'Gourti and Diffa Region of attempting to fix the elections in N'Gourti by orchestrating the kidnap of election officials, and organizing groups of his CDS-Rahama supporters and ex-combatants from his 1990s rebel group to attack areas presumed loyal to rivals.
