= Aminatou Maïga Touré =

Nigerien diplomat and politician

Aminatou Djibrilla Maiga Touré is a Nigerien diplomat. She was Niger's Ambassador to the United States from 2006 to 2010 and has served in the transitional government as Minister of Foreign Affairs since March 2010.

Touré began working at the Foreign Ministry in 1979. She was assigned to its Department of Legal and Consular Affairs until 1991 and was then posted at the Nigerien Embassy to Germany from 1991 to 1995. Returning to Niger, she served as Mayor of Niamey Commune II from 1996 to 2000. Touré was Permanent Secretary at the Ministry of Foreign Affairs from 2000 to 2003 and then Secretary-General of the Foreign Ministry's National Commission for La Francophonie from 2003 to 2005.

After being appointed as Ambassador to the United States, Touré presented her credentials on 9 March 2006. She remained in that post for four years. On 18 February 2010, President Mamadou Tandja was overthrown in a military coup in Niamey, and Salou Djibo, the President of the Supreme Council for the Restoration of Democracy (CSRD), then appointed Touré to serve in the transitional government as Minister of Foreign Affairs on 1 March 2010.
