= Justice and Peace =

Justice and Peace or Peace and Justice may refer to the ideal of peace based on justice, or to institutions working towards this ideal such as:

- Canadians for Justice and Peace in the Middle East, a Canadian pro-Palestine advocacy organisation
- Catholic Commission for Justice and Peace in Zimbabwe, a Zimbabwean human rights organisation
- Justice and Peace Alliance (Kuwait), a Kuwaiti Shi'a Islamist political bloc
- Justice and Peace Law of Colombia, a Colombian law to facilitate the decommissioning of paramilitary groups
- Members group of Peace and Justice, a former parliamentary technical group in South Korea
- Movement for Justice and Peace, a paramilitary group in Côte d'Ivoire
- National Commission for Justice and Peace, a Pakistani human rights organisation
- Peace and Justice (Norway), a Norwegian political party
- Peace and Justice Congress, a South African political party
- Peace & Justice Project, a British leftist political organisation
- Peace and Justice Studies Association, an American learned society
- Peace and Justice Support Network, an American peace organisation affiliated with the Mennonite Church USA
- Pontifical Council for Justice and Peace, a former pontifical council of the Catholic Church
- United for Peace and Justice, an American peace organisation

== See also ==
- Justice for Peace and Development
- Peace, Justice, Progress
