= Sanoussi Jackou =

Nigerien politician (1940–2022)

Sanoussi Tambari Jackou (1940 – July 18, 2022) was a Nigerien politician and the President of the Nigerien Party for Self-Management (PNA-Al'ouma). He was vice-president of the National Assembly of Niger from 1993 to 1994 and served in the government as Minister of State for Higher Education, Research, Technology, and African Integration later in the 1990s. He was a Deputy in the National Assembly from 2004 to 2010.

== Early life and civil service career ==
Jackou was born in Kornaka, located in what is now the Dakoro Department of Maradi Region. His father was a high caste Tuareg while his mother was Hausa. He worked in the civil service beginning in 1970.

Following a failed coup attempt against the regime of Seyni Kountché on March 15, 1976, Jackou was arrested on March 20. He was imprisoned for over 11 years; following Kountché's death, he was released on November 23, 1987. He returned to the civil service in March 1988.

== Political career during the 1990s ==
In the early 1990s, Jackou was a founding member of the Democratic and Social Convention (CDS-Rahama). He was elected to the National Assembly in the February 1993 parliamentary election as a CDS candidate in Maradi constituency. Following the election, he served as vice-president of the National Assembly of Niger from 1993 to 1994.

During the rule of Ibrahim Baré Maïnassara, Jackou joined the government as Minister of State for Higher Education, Research, Technology, and African Integration. As a result, he was expelled from the CDS, of which he had been the deputy leader; he formed a new party, the PNA-Aloumat, in early 1997, allying himself with President Maïnassara. In April 1998, however, he broke with Maïnassara, who was killed during a coup d'état one year later.

== Fifth Republic ==
The PNA-Aloumat won no seats in the 1999 parliamentary election, and Jackou was an opposition leader without representation in the National Assembly for the next five years. In the December 2004 parliamentary election, Jackou was elected to the National Assembly as a candidate in Maradi constituency; he was the only PNA-Aloumat candidate to win a seat. During the 2004–2009 parliamentary term, Jackou was part of the opposition, participating in the parliamentary group of the Nigerien Party for Democracy and Socialism (PNDS). He also served as President of the Economic Affairs and Planning Commission in the National Assembly during that parliamentary term.

In addition to running for a seat in the National Assembly, Jackou also ran for a seat on the municipal council of Dakoro in 2004.

Jackou was one of 14 deputies who filed a censure motion against the government of Prime Minister Hama Amadou on May 26, 2007. Amadou's government was subsequently defeated in a no-confidence vote on May 31. Jackou also opposed the election of Seyni Oumarou to replace Amadou.

Like the leaders of the PNDS, Jackou was outspoken in his condemnation of attempts to extend President Mamadou Tandja's term beyond December 2009, when it was originally scheduled to end. At a rally on 22 December 2008 in Niamey, Jackou called such attempts a "nightmarish" "coup d'état" by the government's supporters.

== Sixth Republic ==
Jackou and the PNA-Aloumat chose to participate in the October 2009 parliamentary election, which was boycotted by the major opposition parties. In an August 2009 interview, Jackou explained that the PNA-Aloumat decided to participate because doing so was necessary "to ensure the survival of our party"; he said that participation in elections was essential to the purpose of a political party and that he had no interest in leading a party that did not take part in elections. He cited the example of the opposition boycott of the 1996 parliamentary election, which he said was a mistake. Despite his decision to participate in the election, Jackou said in the same interview that his party was not breaking with the broader opposition. Regarding the August 2009 constitutional referendum, Jackou said that he supported the move to a presidential system of government, noting that he had long favored such a system, but he was critical of other constitutional changes; he said that the proposed Senate would serve no meaningful legislative purpose and would only delay legislation, while wasting money.

Standing as a PNA-Aloumat candidate, Jackou was re-elected to the National Assembly in October 2009; he was again the only PNA-Aloumat candidate to win a seat. The National Assembly began meeting for the new parliamentary term on November 14, and Jackou presided over the initial meetings due to his status as the oldest Deputy in the National Assembly. In his opening speech, Jackou described the new National Assembly as the best one Niger had ever had, while also stressing the importance of the National Assembly's work: "We have no margin for error. We are true representatives of the people and we face enormous challenges." Although customary practice would have the oldest deputy (the président du bureau d'âge) presiding for only a very brief time before the National Assembly elected a President to lead its work, Jackou said that, because a new constitution had been promulgated since the previous parliamentary term, it was first necessary for the National Assembly to formulate and adopt new internal regulations that would fit the new constitutional structure. Consequently, nine deputies, including Jackou, were chosen to sit on an ad hoc technical committee tasked with formulating the new internal regulations.

The resulting draft of the National Assembly's internal regulations was adopted by a unanimous vote. Jackou presided over the National Assembly for the last time on November 25, 2009, when the deputies unanimously elected Seyni Oumarou as President of the National Assembly. Oumarou praised Jackou for the "diligence" he showed in presiding over the initial meetings. Shortly thereafter, when the National Assembly's permanent commissions were established, Jackou was again designated as President of the Economic Affairs and Planning Commission.

In the local elections held on 27 December 2009, Jackou was elected as a municipal councillor in Dakoro. On 18 February 2010, President Tandja was ousted in a military coup d'état. A junta called the Supreme Council for the Restoration of Democracy (CSRD) took power and immediately dissolved the National Assembly, along with other state institutions.

Jackou supported the candidacy of Mahamadou Issoufou in the second round of the January–February 2011 presidential election, declaring that "the time has come for Mahamadou Issoufou to lead Niger". Issoufou won the election; after he took office as president, he appointed Jackou as Special Adviser to the President, with the rank of Minister, on 20 April 2011.

At the PNA-Aloumat's fifth ordinary congress in February 2014, Jackou was re-elected as party leader.

== Policy positions ==
Jackou, whose father was Tuareg and mother Hausa, has taken special interest in Nigerien Tuaregs conflicts with other groups. He was quoted in 2005 castigating deputies for covering up the continued existence of slavery in the nation and claiming some deputies kept slaves.

In a 2007 televised debate, he warned that the parliamentary opposition also opposed the Tuareg rebels of the MNJ: "I say this to the insurgents: watch out, the forces of democracy are not with you as they were in the 1990s."

Jackou has been outspoken in criticism of the lack of punishment for those who killed President Baré in the April 1999 coup.

As a deputy from a small party, Jackou has been active in voting reform legislation, supporting the introduction of a single ballot for the 2009 elections, but also proposing the scrapping of rules requiring French language ability among candidates, and supporting national single lists for some Assembly seats.

Jackou supported a controversial 2008 pay raise for deputies, which was opposed by civil society groups. He argued that the level of compensation was reasonable when compared to that received by parliamentarians in neighboring countries.

== Press owner ==
Jackou also owns a weekly newspaper based in Niamey, La Roue de l'Histoire. On 18 May 2002, he was arrested, along with the paper's publisher, for comments criticizing Prime Minister Hama Amadou, as well as comments directed at Minister of Trade Seini Oumarou. Jackou was eventually sentenced to a four-month suspended sentence, a 100,000 CFAF fine, and the paper was forced to pay 2 million CFAF damages to the two officials.

In December 2004, Jackou was again arrested for "arousing ethnic hatred" during his appearance on a radio talk show, only to be released on 9 January 2005. Jackou served as a mediator between civil society groups led by the Coalition for Quality and Fairness Against Costly Living, protesting consumption tax rises, and the government in April 2005.

== Personal life ==
Jackou and his wife Françoise had four daughters. The eldest, Rakiatou Kaffa-Jackou is a Minister in the Nigerien government, and another, Guimbia, served as Governor of Niamey.

== Death ==
He died on July 18, 2022, at the Hôpital général de référence de Niamey at Niamey at the age of 82.
