= Aïchatou =

Aïchatou is a given name. Notable people with the name include:

- Aichatou Ousmane Issaka, Nigerien military person
- Aïchatou Boulama Kané (born 1953), Nigerien politician
- Aïchatou Maïnassara (1971–2020), Nigerien politician
- Aïchatou Mindaoudou (born 1959), Nigerien diplomat
