= Democratic Alternation for Equity in Niger =

Democratic Alternation for Equity in Niger Alternance démocratique pour l'équité au Niger
- President: Ousmane Adamou
- Registered: September 2, 2019
- Dissolved: March 26, 2025
- Colors: Blue

The Democratic Alternation for Equity in Niger (French: Alternance démocratique pour l'équité au Niger, ADEN-Karkaraa) is a political party in Niger.

== History ==
The party was registered on 2 December 2018. It was founded by Ousmane Amadou and Sani Attiya, after the latter was expelled from his former party, the Nigerien Patriotic Movement (MPN) following the 2016 Nigerien general election.

== Election results ==
=== Presidential elections ===
Year	Candidate	1st ^{round}		2nd ^{round}		Result
Year	Candidate	Votes	%	Votes	%	Result
2020	Ousmane Amadou	63 396	1,32	-	-	Not elected

=== Legislative elections ===
Legislative elections
Year	Voice	%	Rank	Seats in the National Assembly
2020	48 012	1,02	18e	1 / 166

== See also ==
- List of political parties in Niger
