= Mahamadou Danda =

Nigerien political figure

Prime Minister of Niger
- In office 23 February 2010 – 7 April 2011
- President: Salou Djibo
- Preceded by: Ali Badjo Gamatié
- Succeeded by: Brigi Rafini

Personal details
- Born: 24 July 1951 (age 75) Tahoua, French West Africa (now Niger)
- Party: Independent
- Other political affiliations: MNSD–Nassara

Mahamadou Danda (born 24 July 1951) is a Nigerien political figure who was appointed as Prime Minister of Niger by the Supreme Council for the Restoration of Democracy (CSRD) on 23 February 2010 and left office on 7 April 2011.

== Background ==
Born in Tahoua in 1951, Danda studied in Niamey at the National School of Administration. He continued his studies abroad, ultimately obtaining a degree in political science in France.

== Political career ==
Danda began working under the regime of Seyni Kountché in the 1970s; he was Sub-Prefect of Niamey in 1979 and 1980 and Sub-Prefect of Filingué from 1983 to 1987. Following Kountché's death, he was appointed to the government by Ali Saibou on 20 November 1987, serving as Minister for Animal Resources and Hydraulics until 15 July 1988, when he was dropped from the government. Subsequently he was Administrative Secretary of the National Executive Bureau of the National Movement for the Development of Society (MNSD) in the early 1990s. Danda also served as Permanent Secretary of the Higher Council of National Orientation for a time.

Multiparty elections were held in Niger in 1993. Danda was Chief Technical Adviser to the Prime Minister for Institutional Issues from 23 December 1997 to 16 April 1999.

Following the April 1999 coup d'état, Danda, who was considered a representative of civil society, was appointed by the transitional junta as Minister of Communication, Culture, Youth, and Sports, as well as Government Spokesman, on 16 April 1999. He remained in his post as Minister of Communication until the military handed power to an elected government in December 1999.

=== 2010 events ===
Danda, who has studied in Canada, held the post of Political Counsellor at the Canadian Embassy to Niger (as locally-engaged staff) when President Mamadou Tandja was overthrown in another coup on 18 February 2010. Salou Djibo, the President of the CSRD, then appointed Danda as Prime Minister on 23 February; however, Danda was not assigned the role of head of government, which was assumed by Djibo in addition to his role as head of state.

Danda, who was not a member of any political party, was perceived as a neutral figure. That quality, in addition to his experience, was generally viewed as the reason for his appointment as Prime Minister. Upon his appointment, Danda said that he had "asked for the necessary guarantees to be sure of committing myself in the process leading to a real restoration of democracy". On 1 March 2010, Djibo appointed a transitional government composed of 20 ministers. Five portfolios were assigned to military officers, three of whom (including the Minister of Defense) were generals associated with Tandja.

While Tandja's government consistently sought to downplay the problem of famine and hunger—to the point that it was considered "an almost taboo subject"—the CSRD quickly demonstrated a different approach. On 10 March, Danda issued "an emergency appeal" to the international community for aid. According to Danda, 58% of the population could be affected by lack of food; under Tandja, the number had been placed much lower, at about 20%. Danda discussed the government's plans for emergency relief, and the United Nations and European Union both promised assistance.

=== Later life ===
Danda was part of the National Democratic Institute's delegation observing the March 2015 general election in Nigeria.

Political offices
Preceded by Ali Badjo Gamatié	Prime Minister of Niger; 2010–2011	Succeeded by Brigi Rafini
