= Yacoubou =

Yacoubou is a surname. Notable people with the surname include:

- Ibrahim Yacoubou (born 1971), Nigerien politician
- Isabelle Yacoubou (born 1986), Beninese-born French basketball player.
- Walid Yacoubou (born 1997), Togolese footballer
