= Maïnassara =

Maïnassara is a surname. Notable people with the surname include:

- Aïchatou Maïnassara (1971–2020), Nigerien politician
- Ibrahim Baré Maïnassara (1949–1999), Nigerien military officer
