= Ousmane Issoufou Oubandawaki =

Nigerien politician and engineer

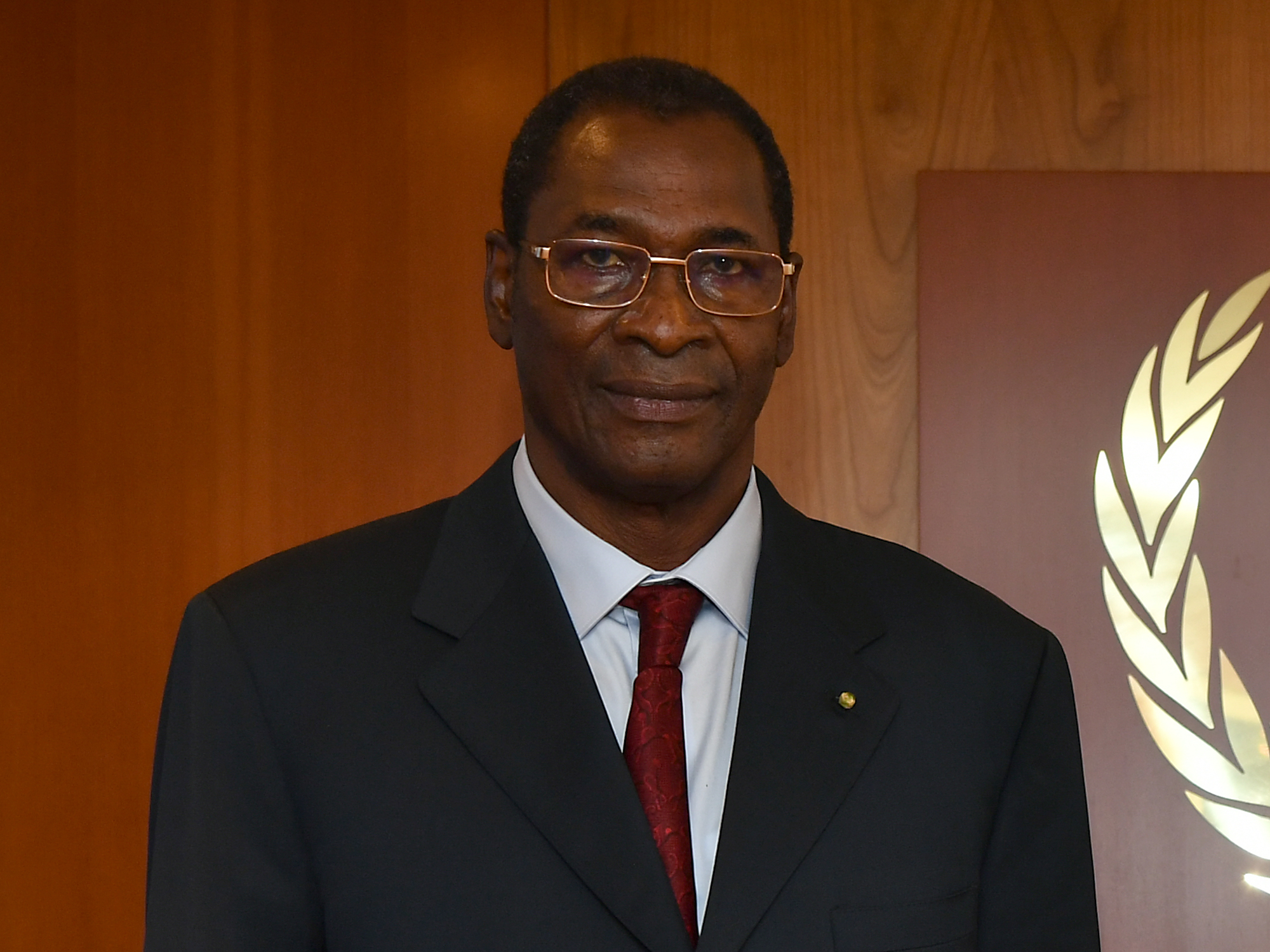
Image of Ousmane Issoufou Oubandawaki

Ousmane Issoufou Oubandawaki (born 5 September 1948) is a Nigerien politician. An engineer by profession, specializing in civil aviation, Oubandawaki held various posts at ASECNA and served in the government of Niger under President Ibrahim Baré Mainassara, first as Minister of National Defense from 1996 to 1997 and then as Minister of Transport from 1997 to 1998. He was Director-General of ASECNA from January 1999 to December 2004.

After founding a political party, the Rally of Nigerien Patriots (Rassemblement des patriotes nigériens, RPN-Alkalami), Oubandawaki was elected to the National Assembly of Niger in 2009 and became President of the Independent Parliamentary Group. He served only a few months in the National Assembly, as it was dissolved in a February 2010 military coup. Since 2011, he has been a Special Adviser to President Mahamadou Issoufou.

== Political career ==
Born in 1948 at Konni in Niger, Oubandawaki studied to become an engineer, graduating from the National School of Civil Aviation in Toulouse in 1973. He also studied air transport economy in Canada at the University of Montreal.

Oubandawaki was ASECNA's Representative in Mauritania and Senegal from 1975 to 1976, and he was Commander of Niamey Airport from 1976 to 1979. Subsequently, he was ASECNA's Representative in Niger from 1979 to 1980, Director-General of Air Niger—the national airline—from 1980 to 1983, and Niger's Director of Civil Aviation from 1983 to 1985.

Oubandawaki became Secretary-General of ASECNA in 1985 and remained in that post for 11 years. President Ibrahim Baré Mainassara then appointed him to the Nigerien government as Minister of National Defense on 23 August 1996. He took office on 29 August.

After soldiers at the Agadez garrison took officials hostage on 2 June 1997, Oubandawaki promptly led a delegation to Agadez; he successfully negotiated the release of the officials and restored government authority on 3 June. In July 1997, he denied reports of a Nigerien–Chadian attack on the Democratic Revival Front (FDR) rebel group at Bosso. Regarding conflicts with rebels, Oubandawaki said during a visit to Mali in early August 1997 that "the situation is calm" and that the government was trying to achieve peace with the FDR, the only rebel group that had not signed a 1995 peace accord by that point.

Later in 1997, some rebels withdrew from the accord, complaining that the process was too slow; Oubandawaki criticized them for making "demands which are not realistic in view of our country's constraints." He then announced on 8 November 1997 that 27 Tuareg rebels had been killed in a "clean-up operation" directed against "dissident fronts opposed to peace".

Oubandawaki was included on the Political Bureau of the Rally for Democracy and Progress (RDP-Jama'a), which was established as the ruling party under Mainassara in 1997. In the government, he was moved to the post of Minister of Transport on 1 December 1997; while serving as Minister of Transport, he was also President of the Board of Air Afrique. After a year as Minister of Transport, he was appointed as Director-General of ASECNA on 13 December 1998, and Senegalese Transport Minister Tijane Sylla was appointed to succeed him at Air Afrique on 30 January 1999.

After ASECNA was awarded the 2001 Oscar Excellence Award for African Managers, Oubandawaki accepted the prize in Paris on 6 July 2002, saying that it "honours us and encourages us to move forward with strictness and good management". ASECNA's Committee of Ministers met in Cotonou on 28 June–2 July 2004 to elect a Director-General for the next six-year term, beginning on 1 January 2005. Oubandawaki was a candidate for re-election; although there was no provision for the re-election of a Director-General, there were precedents for multiple terms. However, he received only six votes from the ministers, against 10 for the Chadian candidate Mahamat Youssouf (an Ivorian candidate received one vote). Oubandawaki accordingly left his post as Director-General at the end of 2004 and was succeeded by Youssouf.

=== President of the RPN-Alkalami ===
Oubandawaki founded a political party, the RPN-Alkalami, on 14 May 2009; a provisional executive bureau was set up to lead the party, with Oubandawaki as its president. Initially the party intended for him to stand as its presidential candidate in the election that was originally planned for late in the year. In response to President Mamadou Tandja's decision to call a referendum on a new constitution that would extend his term in office, the RPN-Alkalami stressed the need for dialogue to resolve the political crisis. If the referendum went forward, the party called on its members to follow their consciences in deciding how to act.

After the success of the referendum in August 2009, the RPN-Alkalami announced that it would participate in the October 2009 parliamentary election, unlike the major opposition parties, which chose to boycott the election. Oubandawaki was the only RPN-Alkalami candidate to win a seat in the National Assembly.

In mid-November 2009, when the National Assembly began meeting for its new parliamentary term, Oubandawaki was chosen as one of nine members of an ad hoc technical committee that was tasked with formulating new internal regulations for the National Assembly. New internal regulations were deemed necessary because a new constitution had been promulgated since the previous parliamentary term.

Together with eight other deputies, Oubandawaki formed the Independent Parliamentary Group in late November 2009, and he was chosen as its president. Aside from Oubandawaki, the group was composed of seven independent deputies from the Adaltchi-Mutuntchi group as well as the independent deputy Issa Lamine.

Oubandawaki endorsed Seyni Oumarou for the second round of the January–March 2011 presidential election and campaigned with him.

== Honors and awards ==
Senegalese President Abdoulaye Wade designated Oubandawaki as a Commander of the Order of Merit of Senegal on 24 October 2005.
