= Rally for Peace and Progress =

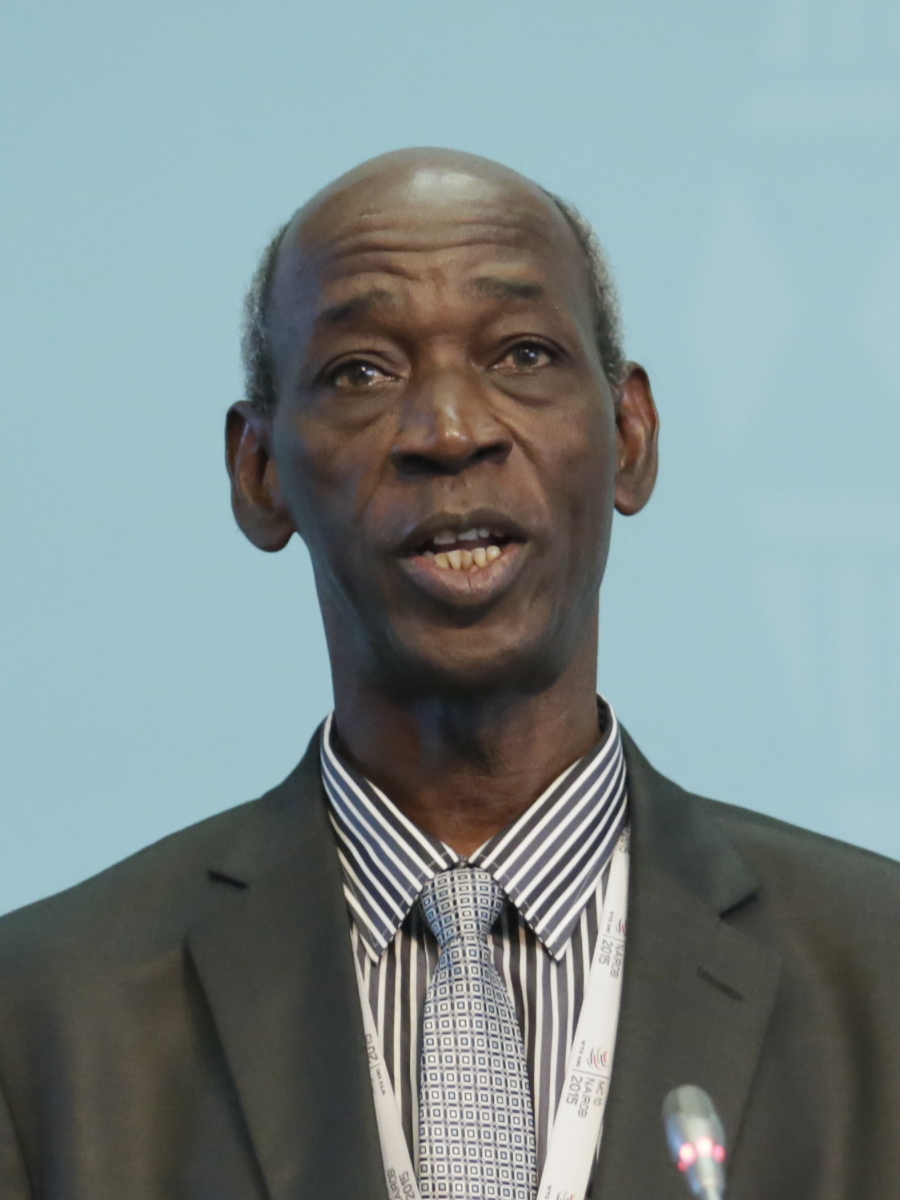
RPP presidential candidate Oumarou Alma in 2015.

The Rally for Peace and Progress (RPP–Farrilla; French: Rassemblement pour la paix et le progrès) was a political party in Niger.

== History ==
The party was founded in 2020, and won 2 seats of the National Assembly in the 2020-21 Nigerien general election.

== Electoral results ==
=== President ===
Election	Candidate	1st round		2nd round		Results
Election	Candidate	Votes	%	Votes	%	Results
2020	Oumarou Malam Alma	118,259	2.47	-	-	Not elected

=== Parliament ===
Élections législatives
Election	Votes	%	Place	Elected
2020	99,043	2.10	11th	2 / 166

== See also ==
- List of political parties in Niger
