= Mohamed Ben Omar =

Nigerien educator and politician (1965–2020)

Minister of Employment, Labor and Social Protection
- In office 27 April 2017 – 3 May 2020
- President: Mahamadou Issoufou
- Prime Minister: Brigi Rafini
- Preceded by: Yahouza Sadissou
- Succeeded by: TBD

Minister of Higher Education
- In office 15 April 2016 – April 2017
- President: Mahamadou Issoufou
- Prime Minister: Brigi Rafini
- Preceded by: Asmane Abdou
- Succeeded by: ?

Fourth Vice-President of the National Assembly of the 6th Republic
- In office March 2011 – April 2016

Fourth Vice-President of the National Assembly of the 4th Republic
- In office 14 November 2009 – 18 February 2010

Minister of Communications
- In office 2007–2009
- President: Mamadou Tandja
- Prime Minister: Seyni Oumarou

Personal details
- Born: 1 January 1965 Tesker, Niger
- Died: 3 May 2020 (aged 55) Niamey, Niger
- Party: Nigerien Social Democratic Party (2015–2020); Rally for Democracy and Progress (before 2015)
- Profession: Teacher; Politician

Mohamed Ben Omar (1 January 1965 – 3 May 2020) was a Nigerien educator and politician. Omar served as a government minister in several cabinets, most recently as Minister of Employment, Labor and Social Protection from April 2017 until his death on 3 May 2020. Omar also founded the Nigerien Social Democratic Party (PSD) in 2015.

== Biography ==
Mohamed Ben Omar was born on 1 January 1965 in Tesker, Niger, located in the country's Zinder Region.

From 2000 to 2004, Omar was a professor of geography at the Lycée Franco-arabe LFA de Niamey.

From 2004 to 2007, he was a minister who was responsible for relations among higher-learning institutions. He served as Niger's Minister of Communication from 2007 to 2009, and was simultaneously a spokesperson for the government. Omar supported a constitutional amendment to let then-President Mamadou Tandja extend his second term in office by three years, but Tandja was overthrown by the military in February 2010 during the 2010 Nigerien coup d'état.

From 14 November 2009 to 18 February 2010, Omar was the Fourth Vice-President of the National Assembly of the 6th Republic. From March 2011 to April 2016, he was Fourth Vice-President of the National Assembly of the 7th Republic.

From April 15, 2016, to April 2017, Omar served as Minister of Higher Education, Research and Innovation. Most recently, Omar served as Minister of Employment, Labor and Social Protection from 27 April 2017 until his death on 3 May 2020.

Additionally, Mohamed Ben Omar served President of the Nigerien Social Democratic Party (PSD), which he founded in 2015. Omar allied the PSD with President Mahamadou Issoufou's Nigerien Party for Democracy and Socialism party. Prior to establishing the PDS, Omar was a member of the Rally for Democracy and Progress (RDP).

Omar died on 3 May 2020 at National Hospital in Niamey at the age of 55. On 5 May 2020, Télé Sahel, the national television broadcaster of Niger, announced that Mohamed Ben Omar had died as a result of COVID-19. His Social Democratic Party (PSD) also confirmed that Omar suffered from COVID-19 via WhatsApp. Omar was buried in a cemetery in Niamey.

Omar died shortly after the death of another prominent Nigerien politician from COVID-19 during the COVID-19 pandemic in Niger, Mahamane Jean Padonou, a 2016 presidential candidate who became a special advisor to President Mahamadou Issoufou.
