= Peace, Justice, Progress =

Peace, Justice, Progress Paix justice progrès
- President: Salou Djibo
- Registered: July 22, 2020
- Dissolved: March 26, 2025
- Headquarters: Niamey
- Colors: Black

Peace, Justice, Progress (French: Paix justice progrès; or PJP - Génération Doubara) was a political party in Niger.

== History ==
The party was created in 2019 by former general Salou Djibo, who had overthrown the current President of the Republic, Mamadou Tandja, in a coup d'état. Salou Djibo was elected president of the party at its first congress on 28 June 2020 in Niamey. It is registered as a political party on 22 August 2019.

== Electoral results ==
=== Presidential elections ===
Year	Candidate	1st round		2nd round		Result
Year	Candidate	Votes	%	Votes	%	Result
2020-2021	Salou Djibo	142,747	2.98	-	-	Not elected

=== Legislative elections ===
Legislative elections
Year	Voice	%	Elected officials	Rank	Government
2020	135,576	2.88	2 / 166	8th	Opposition

== See also ==
- List of political parties in Niger
