= Alliance for Democracy and the Republic =

Alliance for Democracy and the Republic Alliance pour la démocratie et la république
- President: Ibrahim Idi Ango Ousmane
- Registered: 28 September 2020
- Dissolved: 26 March 2025
- Colors: Yellow

The Alliance for Democracy and the Republic (French: Alliance pour la démocratie et la république, abbreviated ADR-Mahita ) is a political party in Niger led by Ibrahim Idi Ango Ousmane.

== History ==
The Alliance for Democracy and the Republic was registered as a political party on 28 September 2020. The first party congress took place on 24 October 2020 in Niamey. Ibrahim Idi Ango Ousmane was then elected president of the party.

== Election results ==
=== Presidential elections ===
Year	Candidate	1st tour		2nd tour		Résultat
Year	Candidate	Votes	%	Votes	%	Résultat
2020-2021	Ibrahim Idi Ango Ousmane	56,100	1.17	-	-	Élu

=== Legislative elections ===
Legislative elections
Year	Votes	%	Elected officials	Rank
2020	41.306	0.88	1 / 166	20th

== See also ==
- List of political parties in Niger
