= Rakiatou Kaffa-Jackou =

Nigerien aeronautical engineer and politician (born 1965)

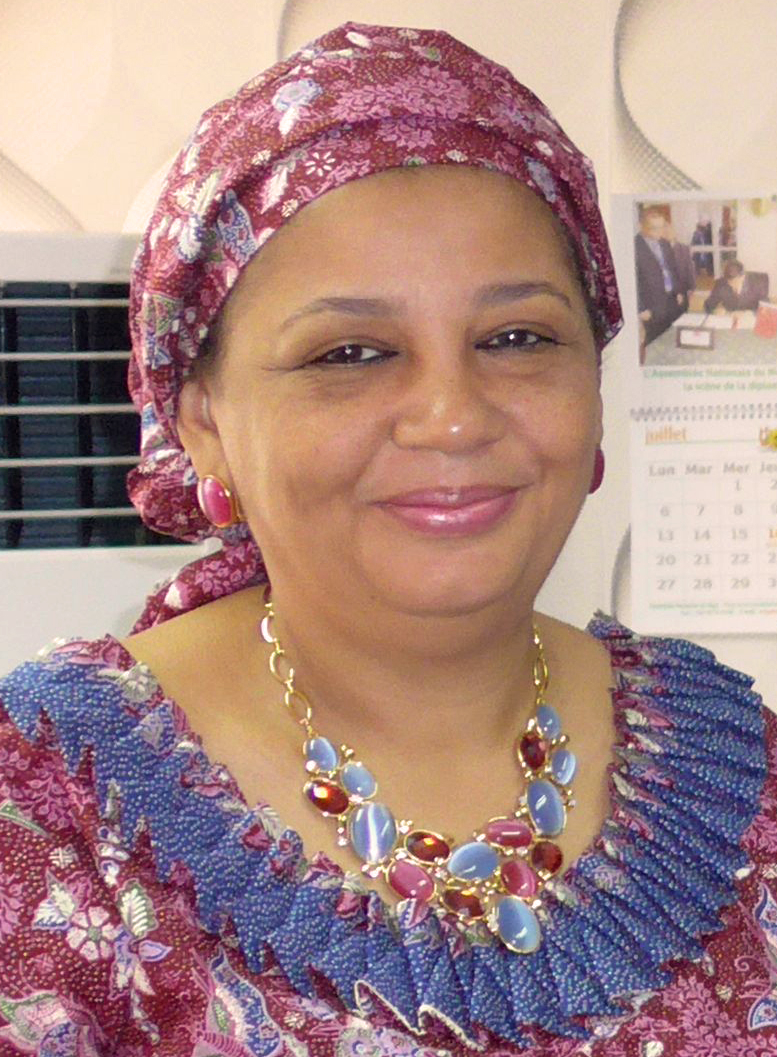
- Rakiatou Kaffa-Jackou in 2015

Personal details
- Born: Rakiatou Kaffa-Jackou; 1965

Rakiatou Christelle Kaffa-Jackou (born 1965) is a Nigerien aeronautical engineer and politician who has served as Minister for Population since 2016.

== Early life and education ==
Kaffa-Jackou is the eldest of four daughters of politician Sanoussi Jackou and Françoise. She went to a girls' mission school in Niamey. Her sister, Guimbia, was later Governor of Niamey. She studied mathematics and physics at the Abdou Moumouni University and has a Masters in Physics. She also has a Diploma in Aeronautical Engineering from the African and Malagasy School of Meteorology and Civil Aviation in Niamey and a PhD from Toulouse University on "Optimization and modeling of airport security".

== Career ==
Kaffa-Jackou worked as part of the management team of Diori Hamani International Airport and taught at the Civil Aviation Academy for nine years. She was appointed to ECOWAS in Abuja with responsibility for civil aviation safety in ECOWAS member states. In 2001, Kaffa-Jackou was responsible for setting up Air Niger International at the request of the government of Niger.

Kaffa-Jackou became a member of the Nigerien Self-Management Party, created by her father. She was appointed Deputy Minister for Industrial Development in 2013 and Minister for African Integration in 2015. She was appointed Minister for Population in 2016 by President Mahamadou Issoufou. In April 2017, she spoke to the United Nations Commission on Population and Development in New York City about the challenges and strategies of managing the demographic boom in Niger, with a growth rate of 3.9% and 50% of the population aged under 15, as well as reducing poverty rates, infant and maternal mortality, and increasing school enrolment.

== Personal life ==
Kaffa-Jackou is married with five children.
