= Kornaka =

- Commune and village
- Location in Niger
- Coordinates: 14°06′N 6°54′E
- Country: Niger

Area
  - Total: 850 sq mi (2,202 km^{2})

Population (2012 census)
  - Total: 140,009
  - Density: 164.7/sq mi (63.58/km^{2})
- Time zone: UTC+1 (WAT)

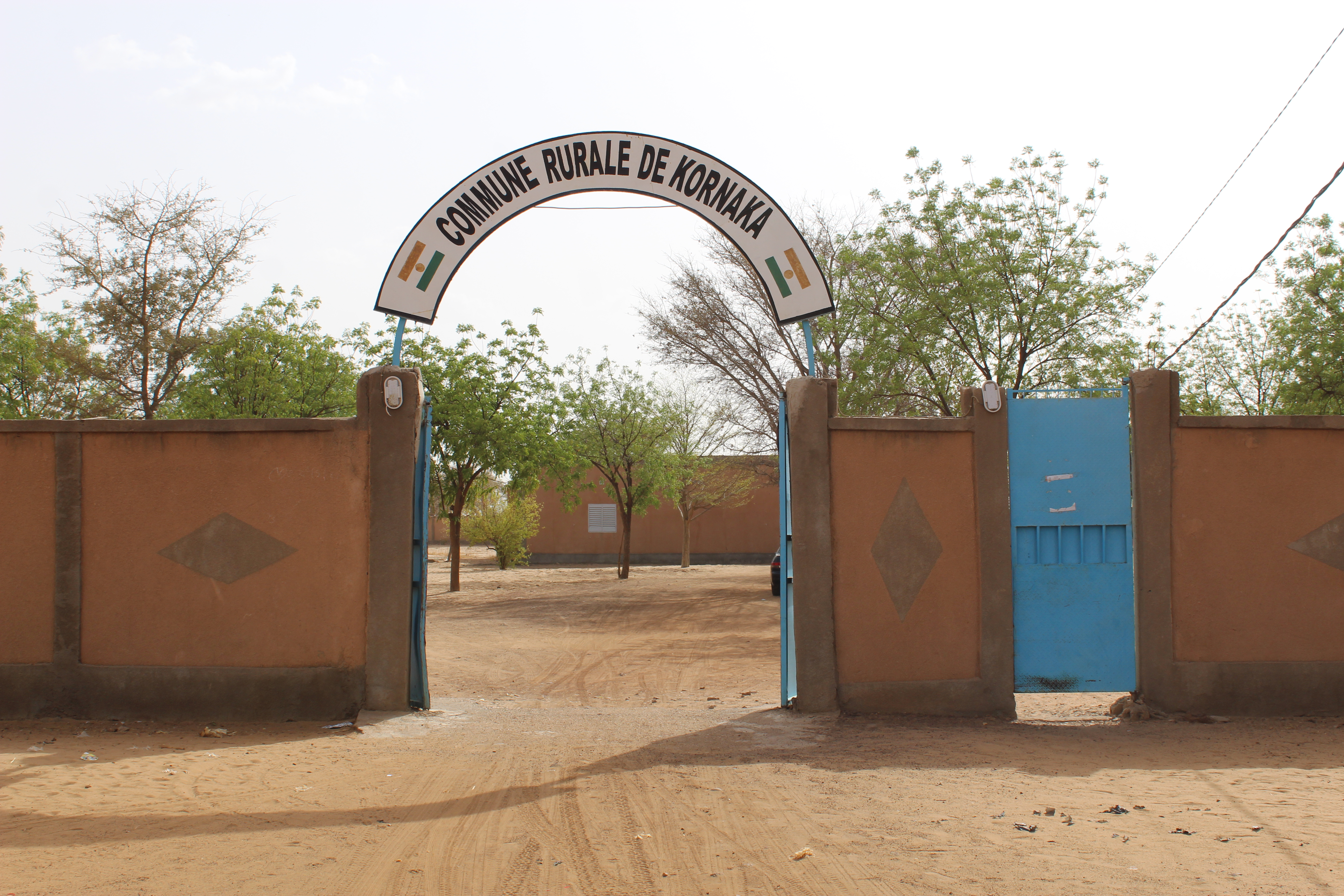

Kornaka is a village and rural commune in Niger. It is the birthplace of politician Sanoussi Jackou.

As of 2012, it had a population of 140,009.
