= Rally of Nigerien Patriots =

The Rally of Nigerien Patriots (French: Rassemblement des patriotes nigériens, RPN-Alkalami) was a political party in Niger.

== History ==
The party was established by former minister Ousmane Issoufou Oubandawaki on 14 May 2009. It received 0.9% of the vote in the October 2009 parliamentary elections, winning a single seat, taken by Oubandawaki. In 2010, Oubandawaki established the Alliance for Democratic Renewal, which the RPN merged into in 2011.
