= Nigerien Rally for Democracy and Peace =

Nigerien Rally for Democracy and Peace Rassemblement nigérien pour la démocratie et la paix
- President: Mounkaila Issa
- Registered: April 16, 2019
- Dissolved: March 26, 2025
- Headquarters: Niamey
- Colors: Orange

The Nigerien Rally for Democracy and Peace (French: Rassemblement nigérien pour la démocratie et la paix, RNDP-Aneima Banizoumbou) is a political party in Niger led by Mounkaila Issa.

== History ==
The Nigerien Rally for Democracy and Peace is registered as a political party on April 16, 2019.

== Election results ==
=== Presidential elections ===
Year	Candidate	1st ^{round}		2nd ^{round}		Result
Year	Candidate	Votes	%	Votes	%	Result
2020-2021	Mounkaila Issa	38,604	0.80	-	-	Not elected

=== Legislative elections ===
Legislative elections
Year	Voice	%	National Assembly	Rank	Government
2020	30.971	0.66	1 / 166	21st	Opposition

== See also ==
- List of political parties in Niger
