= Ali Badjo Gamatié =

Nigerien politician and civil servant

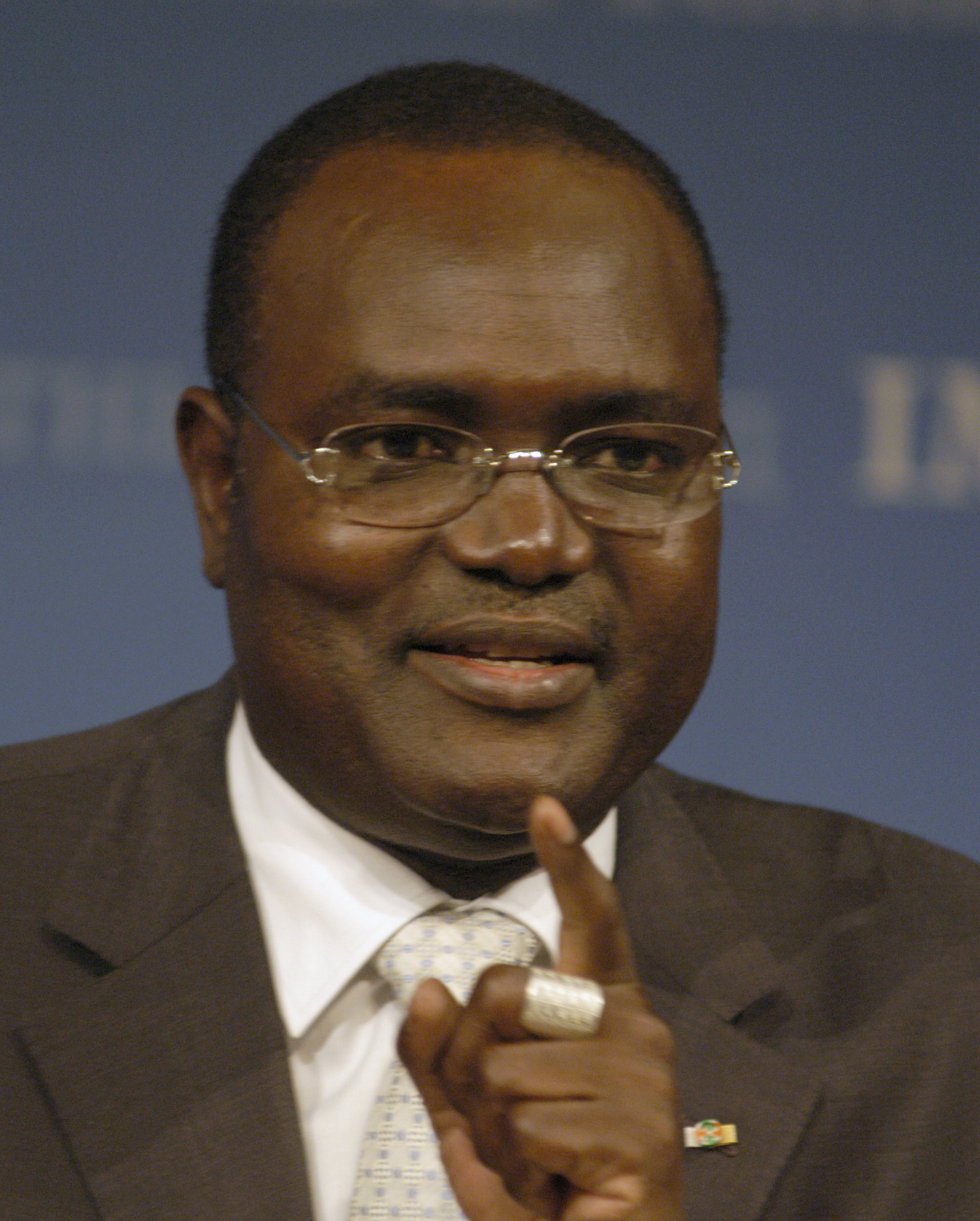

Prime Minister of Niger
- In office 2 October 2009 – 18 February 2010
- President: Mamadou Tandja
- Preceded by: Albadé Abouba (Acting)
- Succeeded by: Mahamadou Danda

Personal details
- Born: 1957 (age 68–69) Niamey, Niger
- Party: National Movement for the Development of Society

Ali Badjo Gamatié (born 1957) is a Nigerien politician and civil servant who served as Prime Minister of Niger from October 2009 to February 2010. He was Minister of Finance from 2000 to 2002 and then served as Vice-Governor of the Central Bank of West African States (BCEAO) before being appointed as prime minister by President Mamadou Tandja. Gamatié was prime minister for only a few months, however, as Tandja was overthrown in a February 2010 military coup.

== Political background ==
In the first government of Prime Minister Hama Amadou, which was named on 5 January 2000, Gamatié was included as Minister of Finance. As Finance Minister, Gamatié was an international advocate for the total cancellation of foreign debts of Niger and other Heavily Indebted Poor Countries (HIPC). He was involved in IMF negotiations on the debt status of these nations. As Finance Minister, he also raised questions about the accountability and representativeness of non-governmental organizations and civil society groups operating in Niger and elsewhere. During his term as Minister, Gamatié oversaw a period of major government cutbacks during a 2002 finance crisis.

In July 2003, journalist Mamane Abou of Le Républicain newspaper in Niamey was arrested for defamation after he wrote an article accusing Gamatié and Hama Amadou of using unauthorized Treasury funds to pay for government contracts. The Finance Minister was also criticized by the opposition for sponsoring 2001 legislation which would dramatically raise taxes on private newspaper publishers, which they feared would bankrupt the opposition press. In October 2003, Gamatié was replaced as Finance Minister by Ali Lamine Zeine. According to the Economist Intelligence Unit, Gamatié was close to Prime Minister Amadou, then seen as a potential rival of President Tandja. Foreign analysis concluded that because of his relationship with the Prime Minister, Gamatié's removal "...may have involved political considerations".

In October 2003, Gamatié was appointed Vice-Governor of the Central Bank of West African States (BCEAO). In 2006 he was on a short list of four candidates to replace Charles Konan Banny as Governor of the central bank.

The Nigerien press reported that opposition leader Mahamadou Issoufou had in 2007 proposed that Gamatié—rather than the eventual Prime Minister Seyni Oumarou—lead a government of national unity when President Tandja sought opposition involvement in the new government following Hama Amadou's removal. During the corruption court cases against Hama Amadou in 2008, Gamatié testified that the 100 million CFA francs Amadou was charged with taking from the treasury were diverted without the Finance Minister's knowledge.

In 2008, Gamatié served as Special Adviser to the President for Mineral Affairs and as chief government negotiator with French uranium mining company Areva, leading to a deal which saw a 1 billion euros investment in Niger's Imouraren mining site.

In August 2009 the Nigerien press reported that Gamatié was a supporter of President Tandja's drive to extend his mandate and create a new constitution. Tandja's constitutional referendum, which established a presidential system and reduced the importance of the office of prime minister by making the president the head of government, was successful; Gamatié was subsequently appointed as prime minister on 2 October 2009.

Tandja was ousted in a military coup on 18 February 2010 and his government was dissolved. Gamatié was one of only three ministers who were not promptly released from house arrest in the days after the coup. According to one of the junta leaders, Colonel Djibrilla Hamidou Hima, the ministers "still under surveillance" had held "very sensitive portfolios" and therefore it was necessary "to ensure their security". The MNSD called for the release of Gamatié, Tandja, and the others.

Suffering from high blood pressure, Gamatié was released from house arrest on 4 March and was promptly hospitalized at the National Hospital of Niamey. After three days there, he was taken to Paris for medical treatment early on 8 March.

Political offices
| Preceded by Albadé Abouba; Acting | Prime Minister of Niger; 2009–2010 | Succeeded by Mahamadou Danda |
