= Adamou Harouna =

Nigerien military figure

Major (or possibly Colonel) Abdoulaye Adamou Harouna (whose name is also reported as Harouna Adamou) is a Nigerien military figure who led the military coup which overthrew President Mamadou Tandja on February 18, 2010.

During the 1999 coup, he served as a close aide to the leader, Daouda Malam Wanké.

In 2010 Harouna led the coup action, in which soldiers drove into Niamey, opened fire on the presidential palace, and captured President Tandja. After the success of the coup, Chef d'escadron Salou Djibo became Niger's de facto leader as head of the Supreme Council for the Restoration of Democracy.

== See also ==
- Supreme Council for the Restoration of Democracy
- 2010 Niger coup d'état
