= Albadé Abouba =

Nigerien politician

Prime Minister of Niger Acting
- In office 23 September 2009 – 2 October 2009
- President: Mamadou Tandja
- Preceded by: Seyni Oumarou
- Succeeded by: Ali Badjo Gamatié

Minister of State of Agriculture and livestock
- In office 11 April 2016 – 8 April 2021
- President: Mahamadou Issoufou
- Preceded by: Oua Saidou
- Succeeded by: Alambedji Abba Issa

Personal details
- Born: Kao, Niger
- Party: Patriotic Movement for the Republic-MPR Jamhuriya (since 2015); National Movement for the Development of Society

Albadé Abouba is a Nigerien politician who has been the Secretary-General of the National Movement for the Development of Society (MNSD-Nassara) since 2009. He served as Niger's Minister of the Interior from 2002 to 2004 and again from 2007 to 2010. Abouba also served as Prime Minister in an acting capacity for a brief period in September–October 2009. In August 2013 he served in the government of President Mahamadou Issoufou as Minister of State. He is now the president of the MPR-Jamhuriya, a political party that he created in October 2015. Since April 2016, he has served as Minister of State, Minister of Agriculture and livestock.

== Political career ==
Abouba is a Bororo (Wodaabe) Fulani from the area of Kao in Tchin-Tabaraden District, which is part of Tahoua Department. He served for a time as sub-prefect of Arlit District, and he was appointed as Minister of the Interior and Decentralization in the government named on 8 November 2002. In order to maintain the balance of party and regional representation in the government, Abouba was dismissed in December 2004 so that the government would not include three MNSD ministers from Tahoua Department. He was instead appointed as Adviser to the Presidency, while holding the rank of Minister.

Abouba was again appointed to the government as Minister of the Interior and Decentralization on 1 March 2007, and in the government of Prime Minister Seyni Oumarou, named on June 9, 2007, he was promoted to the position of Minister of State for the Interior, Public Security, and Decentralization.

When Prime Minister Seyni Oumarou resigned on 23 September 2009 in order to stand as a candidate in the October 2009 parliamentary election, President Mamadou Tandja appointed Abouba to succeed Oumarou in an acting capacity. He was replaced by Ali Badjo Gamatié on 2 October 2009.

Following fighting between the army and an unidentified group near the Malian border, in which seven soldiers and a civilian were said to have been killed, Abouba announced on 7 January 2010 that the group had been "neutralised", with 11 of them killed and a number of them captured.

As Minister of State for the Interior and Secretary-General of the MNSD, Abouba was a key associate of President Tandja. When Tandja was ousted in a military coup on 18 February 2010, Abouba and other members of the government were detained. Abouba was one of several ministers who were not promptly released from house arrest in the days after the coup. According to one of the junta leaders, Colonel Djibrilla Hamidou Hima, the ministers "still under surveillance" had held "very sensitive portfolios" and therefore it was necessary "to ensure their security". The MNSD called for the release of Abouba, Tandja, and the others. The other ministers were eventually released on 4 March, but Abouba and Tandja remained in detention.

After the MNSD issued another demand for the "unconditional and immediate release" of Abouba and Tandja, the head of the junta, Salou Djibo, said on 31 July 2010 that they would not be released. In August 2013 he joined the government of President Mahamadou Issoufou as Minister of State at the President office. That action was an answer for the Government of Union so much wanted by the President. The MNSD then separate into two clans, one supporting the idea of the government and on the other hand some that were against it. For almost a year the MNSD had an internal crisis which created a long process of justice hearing. Then the party had two leaders, Seyni Oumarou and Albadé Abouba. Albadé Abouba and his friends decided to create their own political party called "MPR-Jamhuriya" (Patriotic Movement for the Republic). After the 2016 general elections, Albadé Abouba's party won 13 seats at the parliament. Albadé Abouba is since April 2016 the Minister of State, Minister of Agriculture and Livestock.

== See also ==
- Robert Fowler (diplomat)

Political offices
| Preceded by Seyni Oumarou | Prime Minister of Niger; Acting; 2009 | Succeeded by Ali Badjo Gamatié |
