= Democratic Movement for the Emergence of Niger =

Democratic Movement for the Emergence of Niger Mouvement démocratique pour l'émergence du Niger
- President: Tidjani Abdoulkadri
- Registered: September 28, 2020
- Dissolved: March 26, 2025
- Colors: Blue

The Democratic Movement for the Emergence of Niger (French: Mouvement démocratique pour l'émergence du Niger, MDEN - Falala) was a political party in Niger.

The party was registered on 28 September 2020.

== Election results ==
=== Legislative elections ===
Legislative elections
Year	Votes	%	Seats in the National Assembly	Rank
2020	67,108	1.42	2 / 166	14th

== See also ==
- List of political parties in Niger
