= Frederic Adamou Ngove =

Cameroonian footballer

Frederic Nguidjol
Personal information
- Full name: Frederic Adamou Ngove
- Date of birth: 1 August 1988 (age 38)
- Place of birth: Bertoua, Cameroon
- Height: 1.77 m (5 ft 10 in)
- Position: Midfielder

Team information
- Current team: Union Douala

Senior career*
Years	Team	Apps	(Gls)
–2000	Bebe F.C. Douala		
2000–2007	Cotonsport Garoua		
2008–2010	ES Hammam-Sousse		
2010–	Union Douala		
- * Club domestic league appearances and goals

Frederic Adamou Ngove (born 1 August 1988 in Bertoua) is a professional Cameroonian footballer currently playing for Union Sportive de Douala.

== Career ==
He began his career with Bebe F.C. Douala and moved in 2000 to Cotonsport Garoua. In 2008, he left Garoua and moved to ES Hammam-Sousse.
