= Aichatou Ousmane Issaka =

Nigerien officer

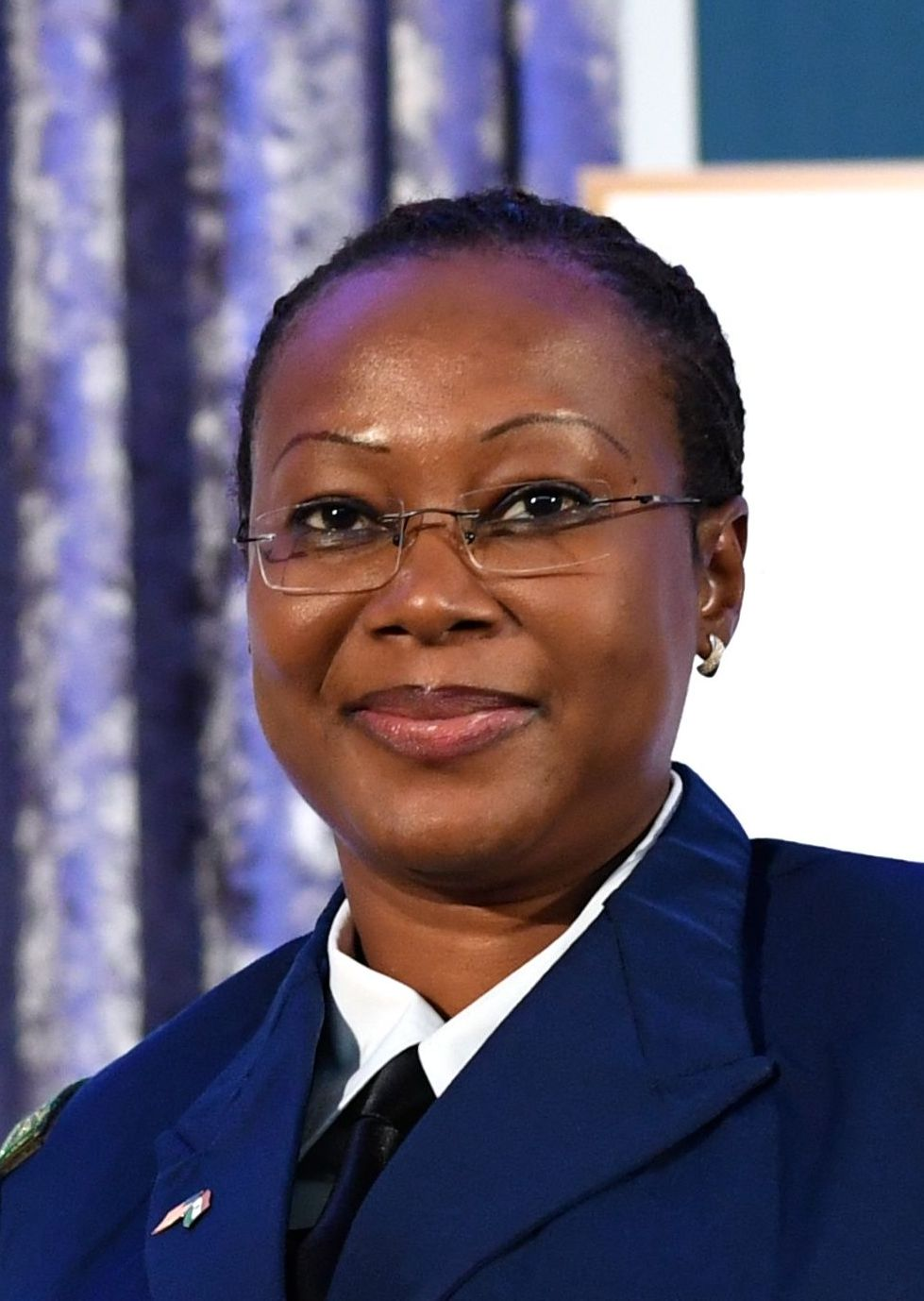
- Occupations: Deputy director of social work, military hospital of Niamey
- Honours: United Nations Military Gender Advocate of the Year Award (2016) International Women of Courage Award (2017)

Major Aichatou Ousmane Issaka, deputy director of social work at the military hospital in Niamey, is one of the first military women in Niger. In 2016, she received the United Nations Military Gender Advocate of the Year Award for her service in Gao, Mali, with the United Nations Peacekeeping Force, MINUSMA, during 2014–2015. She served as a captain in the civilian-military cooperation cell, training fellow officers and reaching out to local women, in accordance with the principles of United Nations Security Council Resolution 1325 (2000) to increase the participation of women and to integrate gender perspectives in peacekeeping efforts. Issaka also accompanied otherwise all-male patrols, making them more accessible to women and children. She was the first recipient of this award.

On March 29, 2017, Issaka received the International Women of Courage Award for her peacekeeping contributions in Niger and Mali from the First Lady of the United States, Melania Trump, and Under-Secretary of State for Political Affairs, Thomas A. Shannon.
