= Tondibia =

Village in Niger

Coordinates: 13°34′N 2°01′E

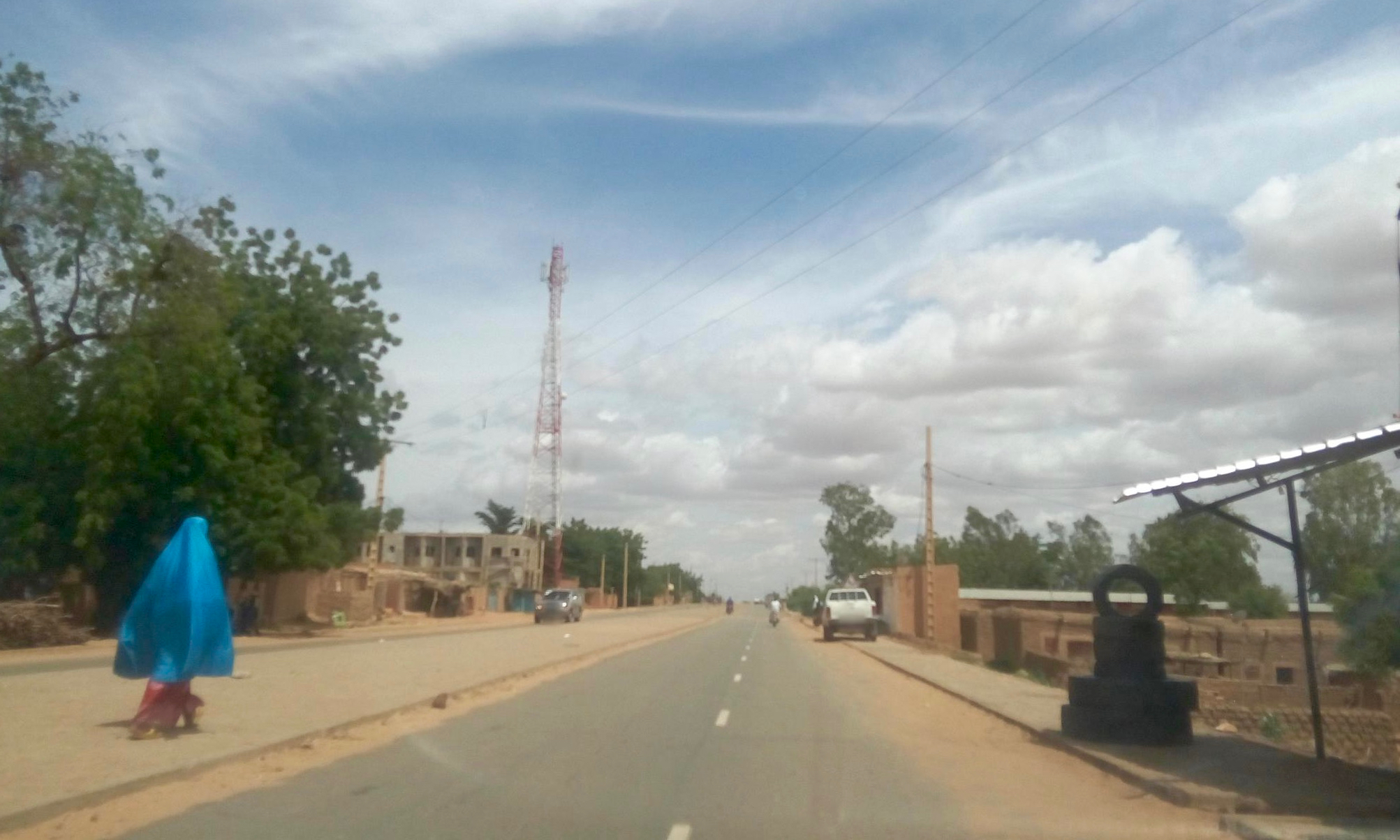
Main road in Tondibia (2018).

Tondibia is a village in Niger, north west of Niamey. At the 2012 census, it had 2,539 inhabitants.
