= Aïchatou Maïnassara =

Nigerien politician (1971–2020)

Member of the National Assembly of Niger
- In office 2016–2020
- Succeeded by: Hadjia Mallam Makka

Personal details
- Born: 16 August 1971 Niamey, Niger
- Died: 5 April 2020 (aged 48) Niamey, Niger
- Party: Nigerien Patriotic Movement
- Children: 7
- Occupation: Politician, civil servant

Aïchatou Maïnassara

Aïchatou Maïnassara (16 August 1971 – 5 April 2020) was a Nigerien politician and member of the Nigerien Patriotic Movement.

== Career ==
Prior to entering politics, Maïnassara worked at the Nigerien Ministry of Finance in Tahoua.

Maïnassara was elected to the Niger National Assembly in the 2016 Nigerien general election in the country's Dosso Region for the Nigerien Patriotic Movement. Her party won five seats of the 171 in Parliament and became part of the government coalition. She was the only female MP in her party and one of twenty-nine female members of the National Assembly.

In 2019 she broke ranks with other members of her party by announcing support for the President Mahamadou Issoufou.

After her death in 2020 she was succeeded in her parliamentary seat by Hadjia Mallam Makka.

== Personal life ==
Maïnassara was born in the Niger capital Niamey in 1971. She had seven children.

She died on 5 April 2020 at the age of 48 and was buried at the Muslim Cemetery in Niamey.
