= 2010 Nigerien constitutional referendum =

- 31 October 2010
- Do you approve of the draft Constitution submitted to your sanction?

Results
Choice	Votes	%
Yes	3,124,152	90.18%
No	340,115	9.82%
Valid votes	3,464,267	97.91%
Invalid or blank votes	74,059	2.09%
Total votes	3,538,326	100.00%
Registered voters/turnout	6,720,335	52.65%

A constitutional referendum was held in Niger on 31 October 2010, after the military coup earlier in the year had ousted elected President Mamadou Tandja. General elections followed on 31 January and 12 March 2011. Approved by 90% of voters, the constitution granted immunity to the coup leaders and stipulated that they had to hand over power by 6 April 2011. They did so as promised following the January–March 2011 general elections. The approval of the referendum also restored the semi-presidential system of government which had been abolished in the disputed referendum in 2009.

== Results ==
Choice	Votes	%
For	3,124,152	90.18
Against	340,115	9.82
Total	3,464,267	100.00
Valid votes	3,464,267	97.91
Invalid/blank votes	74,059	2.09
Total votes	3,538,326	100.00
Registered voters/turnout	6,720,335	52.65
Source: Constitutional Court
