= Garba Lompo =

Nigerien politician

Minister of Justice of Niger
- In office 15 May 2009 – February 2010

Garba Lompo is a Nigerien politician who was Minister of Justice in the government of Niger from May 2009 to February 2010. He was previously the President of the National Commission on Human Rights and Fundamental Liberties (Commission nationale des droits de l'Homme et des libertés fondamentales, CNDHLF).

== President of the CNDHLF ==
At the time of the November–December 2004 presidential and parliamentary election, Lombo congratulated the people on conducting themselves with a sense of civic responsibility during the election.

When Timidria, an anti-slavery group, attempted to organize a ceremony to liberate 7,000 slaves in Inatès in early 2005, the CNDHLF said that the group should instead characterize the ceremony as a "campaign for public awareness and popularisation of the law criminalising slave practices". At the ceremony, held on 4–5 March 2005, CNDHLF President Lompo was present and stated that "any attempt to free slaves in the country [remained] illegal and unacceptable"; he also said that "any person celebrating a slave liberation [would] be punished under the law". In its report released on 28 April 2005, the CNDHLF stated that slavery did not exist in the area and accused those who spread the slavery "rumours" of secretly working to "tarnish the image of the country" and deter donors. In its recommendations, the CNDHLF report called for the arrest of Timidria leaders (two of them were arrested on the day of the report's release), the dissolution of the organization and the freezing of its bank accounts. Lombo urged the Interior Ministry to "ensure a more regular monitoring of NGOs and associations activities in the country".

Later in 2005, Lompo said that "slavery doesn't exist" in Niger. The remaining social relationships that could be classified as slavery were effectively voluntary arrangements, based on tradition and continued because the slaves felt "at ease with the master", according to Lompo.

On 14 September 2006, Lompo addressed the United Nations General Assembly meeting on the High-level Dialogue on International Migration and Development. He announced on 9 November 2007 that the government had initiated a probe to determine whether slavery actually existed or "whether these are just baseless allegations".

After Ali Madou, the Vice-President of the CNDHLF, was kidnapped by Tuareg rebels in mid-May 2008, Lombo called for the rebels to release Madou immediately and without conditions.

Lompo served two three-year terms as President of the CNDHLF. Mamoudou Djibo was elected to succeed him in that post on 4 September 2008.

== Justice Minister ==
Lompo was appointed to the government as Minister of Justice on 15 May 2009. He warned in late December 2009 that the key opposition leaders Mahamadou Issoufou, Mahamane Ousmane, and Hama Amadou would face arrest if they returned to Niger, thereby reactivating arrest warrants that had previously been suspended to facilitate dialogue.
