= Chaibou Adamou =

Cameroonian footballer

Personal information
- Full name: Chaibou Adamou
- Date of birth: December 5, 1985 (age 40)
- Place of birth: Douala, Cameroon
- Height: 1.75 m (5 ft 9 in)
- Position: Forward

Team information
- Current team: Pattani FC
- Number: 32

Senior career*
Years	Team	Apps	(Gls)
2008	Thai Port	12	(1)
2009–present	Pattani	4	(2)
- * Club domestic league appearances and goals

Chaibou Adamou is a player from Cameroon who currently plays in the Thai Division 2 League for Pattani FC.
