= Kao, Niger =

Coordinates: 15°25′N 5°44′E

- Commune and village
- Interactive map of Kao, Niger
- Country: Niger

Area
  - Total: 1,358 sq mi (3,516 km^{2})

Population (2012 census)
  - Total: 65,197
  - Density: 48.03/sq mi (18.54/km^{2})
- Time zone: UTC+1 (WAT)

Kao, Niger is a village and rural commune in Niger. As of 2012, it had a population of 65,197.
