= Peace and Justice Support Network =

The Peace and Justice Support Network (PJSN) is the peace and justice office of Mennonite Church USA. The goal of PJSN is to strengthen Mennonite Church USA's commitment to peace and justice by equipping persons across the church called to this ministry and by encouraging the church to embody and communicate Christ's reconciling way. PJSN produces resources for congregations and individuals, promotes nonviolence and peace, and is involved with several advocacy issues.

== History ==
PJSN formed in the spring of 2002 after the merger of the General Conference Mennonite Church and Mennonite Church. Before the merger, Mennonite Church maintained the Mennonite Church Peace and Justice Committee, while the General Conference maintained a peace wing of its Commission on Home Ministries. Today PJSN is a ministry of Mennonite Church USA and Mennonite Mission Network.

== Advocacy ==
Some of PJSN's areas of advocacy include the Israel/Palestine conflict, human trafficking, healthcare access, immigration matters, military spending and actions, student aid for nonregistrants, anti-racism, and fair trade economics.

== Publications ==
PJSN produces several free publications including PeaceSigns, a monthly ezine featuring commentary on current events and Dove Tales, a biannual newsletter with worship materials, think pieces, and advocacy ideas. PJSN also produces a variety of resources for congregations and individuals, as well as weekly prayers for peace.
