= Adamou Idé =

Nigerien poet and novelist

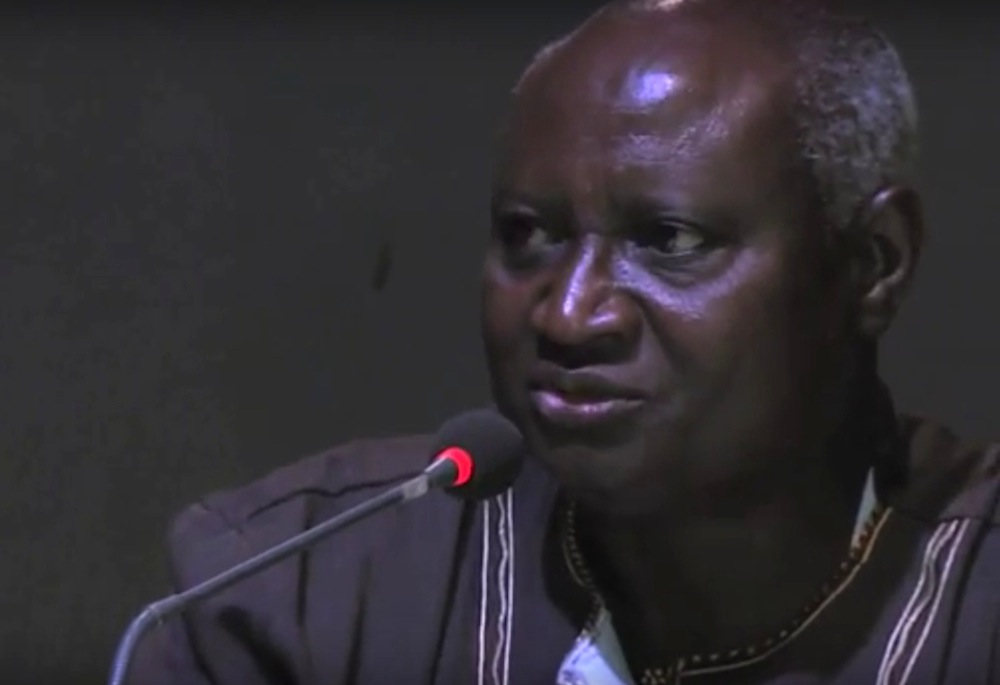
Adamou Idé in 2014

Adamou Idé (born 22 November 1951) is a Nigerien poet and novelist.

== Biography ==
A native speaker of the Zarma language, Idé left his home in Niamey, Niger, to study public administration in France, receiving degrees from The Sorbonne (Université de Paris I) and the Institut international d'administration publique in Paris, serving as an official in the Government of Niger and in international organizations. Idé published his first collection of poems, Cri Inachivé (The Unfinished Cry) in 1984, and his first novel in 1987. He has published both in French and in Zarma. Idé won the first Nigerien National Poetry Prize (Prix national de Poésie) in 1981 and the Grand Prix Littéraire Boubou Hama du Niger in 1996. He has served as a jury member for the Grand prix littéraire d'Afrique noire in 1991 and received the Chevalier de l'Ordre du Mérite ("Knight of the Order of Merit") of Niger. He has served as the president of the "Societé des Gens de Lettres du Niger" and the 3rd African Forum of Documentary Film (Niamey, 2008.)

== Works ==
- Tous les blues ne donnent pas le cafard (Not All Blues Make You Depressed), Novel, Editions La Cheminante, Ciboure, 2009 ISBN 978-2-917598-05-4
- Misères et grandeurs ordinaires (Miseries and Glories of Regular People), Novel, Editions La Cheminante, Hendaye, 2008 ISBN 978-2-917598-00-9
- Chants de mer pour un fils malade, (Sea Shanties for a Sick Child) Poems, Editions Nathan-Adamou, Niamey, 2006
- Ay ne hân J'ai dit que..., (So I Said...) Short fiction, (Edited collection, Zarma language), Editions Albasa, Niamey, 2004
- Wa sappe ay se ! Votez pour moi ! (Vote For Me!) Short fiction, (Zarma language), Editions Albasa, Niamey, 2003 ISBN 978-99919-0-043-8
- Talibo, un enfant du quartier (Talibo, a Neighborhood Child), Novel, Editions L'Harmattan, Paris, 1996 ISBN 978-2-7384-4311-3
- Sur les terres de silence (On the Lands of Silence), Poems, Editions L'Harmattan, Paris, 1994 ISBN 978-2-7384-2571-3
- La Camisole de paille (The Straw Camisole), Novel, Imprimerie Nationale du Niger [INN], Niamey, 1987 OCLC 20932594
- Cri inachevé (The Unfinished Cry, French/Zarma), Poems, Imprimerie Nationale du Niger [INN], Niamey, 1984 OCLC 15300331
