= Congress for the Republic (Niger) =

Political party in Niger

The Congress for the Republic (French: Congrès pour la République, CPR-Inganci) is a political party in Niger.

== History ==
The party was established in September 2014 by former mayor of Maradi Kassoum Moctar.

Moctar was the party's presidential candidate in the 2016 general elections, but failed to advance to the second round. However, the CPR won three seats in the National Assembly.

In the 2020–21 general elections the party did not nominate a presidential candidate, but received 4% of the vote in the parliamentary elections, winning eight seats in the National Assembly.

== Election results ==
=== President ===
Election	Candidate	First round		Second round		Result
Election	Candidate	Votes	%	Votes	%	Result
2016	Kassoum Moctar	135,176	2.9 (#6)	-	-	Lost ✗
2020–21	Did not nominate a candidate					

=== National Assembly ===
Election	Leader	Votes	%	Seats	+/–	Position
2016	Kassoum Moctar	122,573	2.6 (#10)	3 / 171	New	9th
2020	Kassoum Moctar	195,704	4.2 (#6)	8 / 171	▲5	▲5th
