= Democratic and Republican Renewal =

Democratic and Republican Renewal Renouveau démocratique et républicain
- President: Mahamane Ousmane
- Founder: Mahamane Ousmane
- Founded: 16 April 2020
- Banned: 27 July 2023 (work suspended); 26 March 2025
- Headquarters: Niamey
- Colors: Green

Democratic and Republican Renewal (French: Renouveau démocratique et républicain; abbreviated RDR-Tchanji) was a political party in Niger.

== History ==
The party was founded on 16 April 2020 by former President of Niger Mahamane Ousmane, who serves as the party's president.

== Electoral performance ==
- 2020–21 Nigerien general election, second place in the presidential race, 7 seats in the National Assembly.
