= Alliance of Movements for the Emergence of Niger =

Political party in Niger

The Alliance of Movements for the Emergence of Niger (French: Alliance des mouvements pour l'émergence du Niger, AMEN AMIN) was a political party in Niger.

== History ==
The party was launched in 2015 by Minister of Industrial Development Oumarou Hamidou Tchiana, a former secretary general of the Nigerien Democratic Movement for an African Federation.

The party did not nominate a presidential candidate in the 2016 general elections, but did contest the parliamentary elections, winning three seats in the National Assembly.
