= Patriotic Movement for the Republic =

Political party in Niger

Patriotic Movement for the Republic Mouvement patriotique pour la République
- President: Albadé Abouba
- Founded: 11 October 2015
- Banned: 27 July 2023 (work suspensed); 26 March 2025
- Split from: MNSD-Nassara
- Headquarters: Niamey
- Colors: Orange

Party flag

The Patriotic Movement for the Republic (French: Mouvement patriotique pour la République, MPR-Jamhuriya) was a political party in Niger.

== History ==
The party was launched on 11 October 2015 as a breakaway from the National Movement for the Development of Society.

It did not nominate a presidential candidate for the 2016 general elections, but received 7% of the vote in the National Assembly elections, winning thirteen seats and becoming the fourth-largest party in parliament.

== Electoral results ==
=== President of Niger ===
Election	Candidate	Votes	%	Votes	%	Result
Election	Candidate	First round		Second round		Result
2016	Did not take part					
2020-21	Albadé Abouba	338,511	7.1 (#4)	-	-	Lost ✗

=== National Assembly ===
Election	Leader	Votes	%	Seats	+/–	Position
2016	Albadé Abouba	343,150	7.2 (#4)	13 / 171	New	4th
2020	Albadé Abouba	257,563	7.6 (#3)	14 / 171	▲1	▲3rd
