= Oumarou Malam Alma =

Nigerien politician (1951–2025)

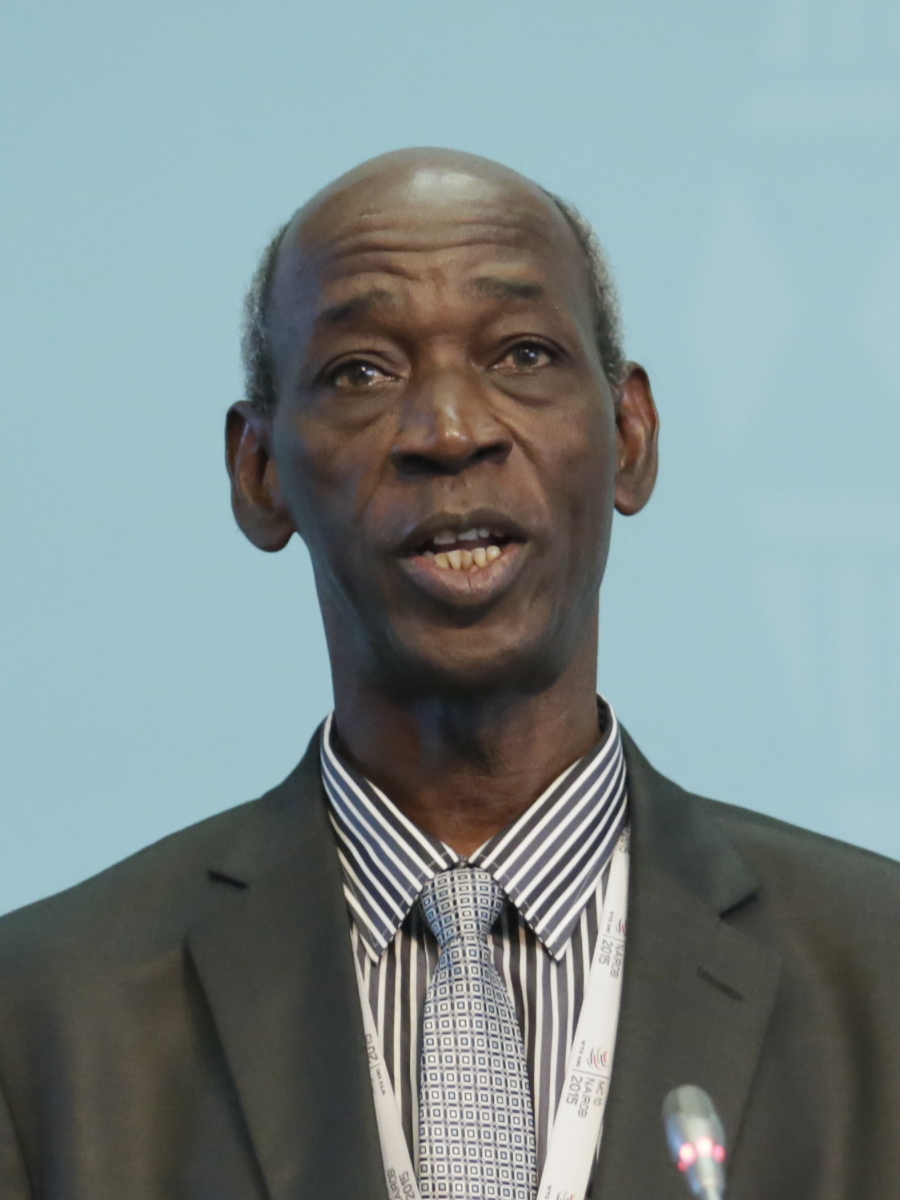
Alma in 2015

Oumarou Malam Alma (7 June 1951 – 7 March 2025) was a Nigerian politician who was an MP from 2021 until his death on 7 March 2025, at the age of 73.

== Early life ==
Oumarou Alma was born on 7 June 1951. He attended primary school in his native village of Kantché, a middle school in Magaria and the Lycée National in the capital Niamey, where he obtained his baccalaureate in 1971. He then studied at the University of Lomé in Togo, then at the University of Abidjan, in Côte d'Ivoire, where he obtained a law degree in 1975. He completed his university education in 1976 at the Université Libre de Bruxelles in Belgium, from where he graduated with a degree in insurance law and a master's degree in public health. Back in Niger, Oumarou Alma worked in public administration from 1976. He was one of the founders of the Société nigérienne d'Assurances et de Réassurances (SNAR-Leyma), where he was deputy general manager from 1977 and general manager from 1988 to 1993. From the late 1980s, Alma was also chairman of the board of directors of several companies, including the banking company SONIBANK, and director of the Hôtel Gawèye de l'État in the capital. He was also honorary president of the Sahel Sporting Club football club.

== Career ==
During the 1991 National Conference, which marked the beginning of Niger's transition to a multi-party democracy, he was part of the preparatory committee and was a delegate. Alma joined the former single party National Movement of Development Society (MNSD-Nassara) and became president of the party's Zinder branch. He was elected deputy for the Kantché constituency in the 1999 legislative elections and sat in the National Assembly until 2009. He held the position of Chairman of the Finance Committee to 2007, he has been a member of the board of directors of the banking group Atlantic Bank Group In the 2020 presidential election, he obtained 2.47% of the vote as a candidate for the RPP-Farilla and came seventh out of thirty candidates. In July 2023, after the coup, Oumarou Alma was arrested and placed under house arrest by the ruling junta.
