= Social Democratic Party (Niger) =

Political party in Niger

Social Democratic Party Parti social-démocrate
- General Secretary: Ibrahim Kasso
- Founded: 5 December 2015
- Dissolved: 27 July 2023 (work suspensed); 26 March 2025
- Headquarters: Zinder

The Social Democratic Party (French: Parti social-démocrate, PSD-Bassira) was a political party in Niger.

== History ==
The party was launched in December 2015 by former minister Mohamed Ben Omar. It did not nominate a presidential candidate in the 2016 general elections, but won two seats in the National Assembly. The party won only a single seat in the 2020-21 Nigerien general election.

== Electoral results ==
=== National Assembly ===
Election	Leader	Votes	%	Seats	+/–	Position
2016	Mohamed Ben Omar	43,285	0.9 (#16)	2 / 171	New	13th
2020	Ibrahim Kasso	45,777	1.0 (#19)	1 / 171	▼1	15th
