= Ibrahim Yacouba =

Nigerien politician

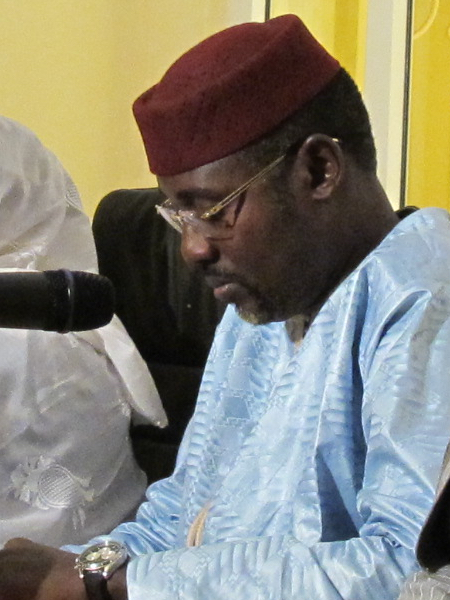
- in 2014
- Born: 8 August 1971 (age 54); Maradi, Niger
- Occupation: Politician
- Political party: Nigerien Patriotic Movement

Ibrahim Yacouba, also known as Ibrahim Yacoubou (born 8 August 1971), is a Nigerien politician who has served in the government of Niger as Minister of Foreign Affairs from 2016 to 2018. He leads the Nigerien Patriotic Movement.

== Life and career ==
Following the ouster of President Mamadou Tandja in February 2010, Yacouba was General Rapporteur of the National Advisory Council, set up by the junta that ousted Tandja, in the 2010–2011 transitional period.

Yacouba, a member of the ruling Nigerien Party for Democracy and Socialism (PNDS), was appointed to the government as Minister of Transport in April 2012 and then moved to the post of Deputy Director of the Cabinet of President Mahamadou Issoufou in September 2013. However, following a dispute with some leading PNDS members, he was expelled from the party on 23 August 2015. He resigned as Deputy Director of the Cabinet shortly thereafter.

Yacouba launched a new party, the Nigerien Patriotic Movement (MPN), on 8 November 2015. He stood as the MPN's candidate in the February 2016 presidential election. Following the first round of voting, he announced his support for President Issoufou in the second round of voting, held in March 2016. Issoufou was re-elected, and he rewarded Yacouba and other minor candidates who backed him with government posts; Yacouba was appointed as Minister of Foreign Affairs on 11 April 2016.

On January 4, 2024, Ibrahim Yacouba was arrested and arrested in Niamey, Niger. He was released on 1 April 2025.

== See also ==
- List of foreign ministers in 2017
- List of current foreign ministers
