= Supreme Council for the Restoration of Democracy =

Nigerien military junta (2010–2011)

The Supreme Council for the Restoration of Democracy (French: Conseil suprême pour la Restauration de la Démocratie, or CSRD), led by Salou Djibo, was a military junta that staged a coup in Niger on 18 February 2010, deposing President Mamadou Tandja in response to Tandja's attempts to remain in office after his term was over. The CSRD stated that its objective is to make Niger an example of "democracy and good governance."

During the two days following the coup, thousands of people demonstrated in the streets to support the military government and its stated intention of installing democracy. The junta scheduled a referendum later that year to ask the public whether the junta should hand over power within the year, which passed successfully. As stipulated by the referendum, the junta scheduled free and fair elections for 2011, in which former opposition leader Mahamadou Issoufou was elected president, and returned control of the government.

== Members ==
- Col. Salou Djibo, Chairman
- Col. Djibrilla Hima Hamidou, had been spokesman in the 1999 coup
- Col. Goukoye Abdul Karimou, junta spokesman
- Col. Adamou Harouna, aide-de-camp of 1999 coup leader Maj. Daouda Mallam Wanke.

== Actions ==
The CSRD suspended Niger's constitution and dissolved all state institutions. It placed President Mamadou Tandja in captivity at a military barracks on 18 February 2010. On 2 March 2010, the CSRD announced the interim government of Niger—which included three generals with ties to Tandja—and reiterated their promise to return to democracy. They have also announced that CSRD members and politicians from the interim government will not stand in elections.

== Referendum and elections in 2010–11 ==
In late 2010 the Supreme Council for the Restoration of Democracy organized a constitutional referendum. In early 2011, a parliamentary election and a presidential election were held in Niger. Former opposition leader Mahamadou Issoufou was elected as president, and the CSRD peacefully transferred power soon after.
