= 2009 Nigerien parliamentary election =

- 20 October 2009
- All 113 seats in the National Assembly; 57 seats needed for a majority
Party	Vote %	Seats	+/–
MNSD	47.34	76	+29
RSD	15.68	15	+8
RDP	10.45	7	+1
PNA	1.56	1	0
PMT	1.33	1	+1
UNI	1.18	1	0
RPN	0.89	1	New
Independents	8.96	11	+11
This lists parties that won seats. See the complete results below.
Results by constituency.
President of the National Assembly before	President of the National Assembly after
Mahamane Ousmane; CDS-Rahama	Seyni Oumarou; MNSD

Parliamentary elections were held in Niger on 20 October 2009, after President Mamadou Tandja dissolved the National Assembly in May 2009 and a constitution referendum was held in August 2009. The elections were boycotted by most opposition parties, and saw Tandja's National Movement for the Society of Development (MNSD) win a landslide victory.

== Background ==
The Independent Electoral Commission announced on 15 May 2009 that the elections would be held on 28 November 2009, between the first and second rounds of the planned presidential elections on 14 November and 6 December 2009. However, the Electoral Commission announced in June that the parliamentary elections would be moved to 20 August, two weeks after the controversial referendum on a new constitution that allowed Tandja to remain in office until 2012.

=== Constitutional crisis ===
This period prior to the elections was dominated by controversy regarding Tandja's efforts to have the constitution changed so that he would be allowed to run for re-election; those efforts were opposed by the opposition, as well as parties within the presidential majority coalition and some elements of the MNSD. In May 2009, after Tandja informed the National Assembly of his plans to call a referendum on the matter, 23 deputies asked the Constitutional Court to rule on whether he could do so. The Court ruled against Tandja on 25 May 2009; it said that although article 49 of the constitution allowed the President to call referendums, it should not be interpreted to mean he could call referendums on the content of the constitution itself, because the presidential oath required him to respect the constitution. Tandja then promptly dissolved the National Assembly on 26 May. It was suggested that he did so because he was concerned that the government would lose its parliamentary majority and face a vote of no confidence.

The election date was originally set by the Supreme Court on 19 June 2009. The Chairman of the 66 member decentralized organization which operates and certifies all elections, Niger National Independent Election Commission (CENI), Moumouni Hamidou stated, following the 18 June Court decision, that they would not hold the 4 August referendum, and were preparing almost 7 million voting cards for the 20 August legislative election.

Despite this, Interior Minister Albade Abouba announced on 28 June, following Tandja's assumption of emergency powers, that both the 4 August referendum and the 20 August parliamentary elections would go ahead.

== Campaign ==
On 19 August 2009, following the success of the referendum, it was announced that the parliamentary elections would be held on 20 October 2009, with a campaign period lasting from 28 September to 18 October. The opposition indicated that it would boycott the election, officially announcing their intention to do so on 26 September. The following day, Tandja called for a massive turnout. The campaign began on 28 September, as planned. About 20 parties participated, although most of them supported Tandja and were allied with his MNSD.

== Conduct ==
Despite the opposition boycott and warnings from the Economic Community of West African States (ECOWAS), the elections were held as planned on 20 October. ECOWAS promptly suspended Niger "until constitutional legality is reinstated", stating that it would "not recognize the outcome" of the elections. Niger's Foreign Minister, Aichatou Mindaoudou, said on 21 October that ECOWAS had made a mistake in its "assessment of the political situation in our country" and that Niger would try to convince ECOWAS to change its position, without "cast[ing] aspersions on ECOWAS".

== Results ==
The turnout for the elections was 51.27% of the six million registered voters. According to official results announced by CENI President Moumouni Hamidou on 24 October the governing MNSD won the elections by taking 76 of 113 seats in the National Assembly. The MNSD had held 47 seats in the previous assembly. Five parties considered allied to the MNSD won 25 seats: 15 for the Social Democratic Rally (RSD), seven for the Rally for Democracy and Progress (RDP), one for the Rally of Nigerien Patriots (a party founded in June 2009 by a former cabinet minister), one for the Party of the Masses for Labour, one for the Union of Independent Nigeriens (Union des Nigériens Indépendants) and one for the Nigerien Self-Management Party. The RSD increased its number of seats by eight from the previous elections in 2004, whilst the RDP gained an extra seat. Eleven independent candidates won the remaining seats, marking first time that independents have won seats in the assembly. The Constitutional Court had 15 days to validate the elections from the date of the announcement of the results.

Party	Votes	%	Seats	+/–
National Movement for the Society of Development	1,422,698	47.33	76	+29
Social Democratic Rally	471,458	15.68	15	+8
Rally for Democracy and Progress	314,193	10.45	7	+1
People's Democratic Party	77,973	2.59	0	New
Party for Socialism and Democracy in Niger	69,418	2.31	0	–1
Movement for Unity and Recovery of the Nation	67,708	2.25	0	0
Union for Democracy and Social Progress	49,152	1.64	0	New
Nigerien Self-Management Party	46,953	1.56	1	0
Party for National Unity and Development	42,397	1.41	0	0
Party of the Masses for Labour	40,059	1.33	1	+1
Union of Independent Nigeriens	35,501	1.18	1	–
Movement for Democracy and Reform	35,389	1.18	0	New
Rally of Nigerien Patriots	26,747	0.89	1	New
Party of Consultation and Peace	11,562	0.38	0	0
Alliance for Democracy and Peace	7,679	0.26	0	New
Movement of Nigerien Patriots	7,343	0.24	0	New
CCID-Liliwal	1,957	0.07	0	New
Party for People's Dignity	1,910	0.06	0	0
Independent Republicans and Democrats	1,787	0.06	0	New
Union of Democratic and Progressive Patriots	1,211	0.04	0	0
Democratic and Socialist Union of Renewal	1,030	0.03	0	New
Nigerien Labour Party	789	0.03	0	New
Democratic and Revolutionary Movement for People Power	618	0.02	0	New
Republican Party for Progress and Freedoms	428	0.01	0	New
Nigerien Party for the Reinforcement of Democracy	357	0.01	0	New
MDN Alkawali	155	0.01	0	New
Movement for Nigerien Democracy and Development	132	0.00	0	New
Independents	269,200	8.96	11	+11
Total	3,005,804	100.00	113	0
Valid votes	3,005,804	96.75		
Invalid/blank votes	100,919	3.25		
Total votes	3,106,723	100.00		
Registered voters/turnout	6,059,961	51.27		
Source: Constitutional Court

== Aftermath ==
At the official certification of the results on 11 November, the government announced that one seat in the Tassarra constituency, which had been won by an independent candidate, had been annulled by the Constitutional Court, and a by-election for that seat would take place at an unspecified date. Until that time, only 112 of the 113 representatives would be seated. A second change made by the court, annulling the vote at a single polling station in Koygolo Commune, Boboye Department, Dosso Region did not change the overall result in that seat. In doing so the Court turned down several other appeals against the results, and declared that the five-year term of the 112 deputies had begun at 0:00 hours on 11 November 2009, and would end at exactly 24:00 hours on 11 November 2014.

MNSD President Seyni Oumarou was elected President of the National Assembly on 25 November 2009; the vote was unanimous, with all of the 109 deputies present voting in favor. Oumarou said on the occasion that he would work to restore the National Assembly's image in the wake of the controversies of the preceding months.
