= 2010 Nigerien coup d'état =

Military overthrow of Mamadou Tandja

Coordinates: 13.5167°N 2.1167°E

Date	18 February 2010
Location	Niger
Result	Coup successful: Government overthrown; Establishment of the CSRD; Free and fair general election held in January 2011

Belligerents
(Niger) Government of Niger; Supported by: France	(Niger) Free Officers

Commanders and leaders
(Niger) Mamadou Tandja	(Niger) Salou Djibo (Niger) Adamou Harouna

Strength
Unknown	Unknown

Casualties and losses
- 10 killed (6 civilians, 4 soldiers)

A coup d'état occurred in Niger on 18 February 2010. Soldiers attacked the presidential palace in Niamey under weapons fire at midday and captured President Mamadou Tandja, who was chairing a government meeting at the time. Later in the day, the rebels announced on television the formation of the Supreme Council for the Restoration of Democracy (CSRD), headed by chef d'escadron Salou Djibo.

== Background ==
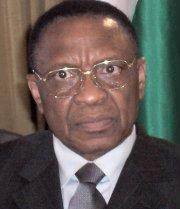
President Mamadou Tandja in 2007

The coup followed a year-long political crisis in Niger related to President Tandja's efforts to extend his mandate beyond December 2009, when his second term was originally scheduled to end. Arguing that the people wanted him to remain in office, Tandja dissolved the National Assembly in May 2009 and subsequently appointed a new Constitutional Court, enabling him to push forward with a constitutional referendum in August 2009 that extended his mandate for an additional three years. The new constitution also enhanced Tandja's power by scrapping the semi-presidential system of government in favor of a presidential system.

The opposition reacted furiously to Tandja's efforts to remain in office and denounced him as a dictator. Tandja also faced strong international and regional criticism as a result of the events of 2009; Niger was suspended from the Economic Community of West African States (ECOWAS), and some aid from western countries was halted. While Tandja said that he needed to remain in office to oversee various projects of tremendous economic value, others felt that Niger, as one of the poorest nations in the world, was in a poor position to cope with any degree of isolation. The former minister Mariama Gamatié pointed to a serious and ongoing hunger problem and argued that "we cannot afford [Tandja's] ego."

Although Tandja negotiated with the opposition in talks that were mediated by ECOWAS, the talks were thought to have reached a stalemate by February 2010. The opposition blamed Tandja for the lack of progress and continued to protest his rule. A large protest, over 10,000-strong, was held in Niamey on 14 February 2010.

Tandja was one of Niger's most enduring politicians, first entering politics through his participation in the 1974 coup d'état that brought Seyni Kountché to power. He held various high-level posts under the Kountché regime and then headed the National Movement for the Society of Development (MNSD) as an opposition leader during the 1990s. A 1999 coup d'état paved the way for a free and fair election in which Tandja was elected president.

== Initial violence ==
A group of soldiers from a barracks at Tondibia, near Niamey, reportedly entered the city with armored vehicles at noon on 18 February 2010 and opened fire on the presidential palace. They did so while a meeting of the government, chaired by Tandja, was beginning. Gunfire and explosions near the presidential palace were heard "non-stop" for about 30 minutes, followed by "sporadic shooting". A "senior French official" told the news agency Agence France-Presse that a coup attempt was underway and that "it would appear that Tandja is not in a good position". As a result of the attack, Tandja was captured by the rebel soldiers.

At least 10 people, including four soldiers, were killed. The French government asked French nationals in Niamey to remain indoors for safety.

After the violence began, streets in the city center were quickly deserted as civilians sought shelter from the events. The national radio station Voix du Sahel continued to broadcast, although it was interrupted for 15 minutes. Subsequently, it failed to mention the violence during a normal news report for the afternoon and played traditional music.

== Subsequent events ==
A few hours after the initial violence, reports emerged indicating that the coup attempt, said to be led by Major Adamou Harouna, had succeeded. Tandja and government ministers were said to be held in detention at a point near the palace. Military music was broadcast on the national radio.

Later in the day, the formation of a ruling junta, the Supreme Council for the Restoration of Democracy (CSRD), was announced on television. Speaking for the CSRD, Colonel Abdul Karim Goukoye, who was surrounded by other soldiers, announced that the constitution was suspended and state institutions, such as the National Assembly, were dissolved. He called for calm and unity among the people and urged "national and international opinions to support us in our patriotic action to save Niger and its population from poverty, deception and corruption". According to Goukoye, the military had acted because it felt the need to resolve Niger's "tense political situation". The announcement did not mention Tandja, and it also failed to clarify how long the CSRD planned to remain in power. It did, however, say that the national borders were closed and an overnight curfew was being imposed. The border closure and curfew were lifted the next day.

Although the coup action was reportedly led by Adamou Harouna, the CSRD was headed by Colonel Salou Djibo. At the time of the coup he was considered an obscure figure, little known by the general public. The presence in the junta of some officers who had previously participated in the 1999 coup, which led to free and fair elections within a relatively short timeframe, raised hopes in some quarters that the CSRD would pursue a similar course.

According to Reuters, life in Niamey had largely returned to normal by 19 February and there was "a sense of relief and hope for change" after an extended political crisis and semi-isolation. The work of government continued, with ministries being managed by their secretaries-general. Speaking on 19 February, Djibo was reticent about the CSRD's intentions, saying only that "we are at a starting point, and we will create a consultative body". Speaking to the BBC, Goukoye gave assurances about Tandja's health and safety: "We are taking care of him—remember he is one of our elder soldiers". He also said that most of Tandja's ministers had been released; although three remained in detention, Goukoye said that they too would be released within days.

In the immediate aftermath of the coup, the opposition Coordination of Democratic Forces for the Republic (CFDR) coalition notified the junta of its willingness "to make its contribution for the creation of a new constitution and the organization of free, honest and transparent elections". The CFDR also held a rally in Niamey on 20 February, in which over 10,000 people participated. On that occasion, the CFDR thanked the junta for ousting Tandja and expressed solidarity with the army, viewing the coup as an opportunity to restore democracy.

At a summit of West African leaders in Bamako on 20 February, Colonel Djibrilla Hima, a member of the junta, said that elections would be held at some point, when the situation was stabilized and the appropriate conditions existed. Mohamed Ibn Chambas, the President of the ECOWAS Commission, met with the junta on 21 February and said afterward that it wanted "a short transition"; the transitional process would include a political dialogue, and the timetable of the transition would be determined through that dialogue. Hima, meanwhile, pointed to the successful transition initiated by the 1999 coup and gave an assurance that "we are going to do the same thing". He also argued that the army had seized power only as a last resort after the politicians had failed to resolve the situation. As for Tandja, Hima said that he was being held under house arrest at a Niamey villa.

According to Hima, the three ministers "still under surveillance"—Prime Minister Ali Badjo Gamatié, Interior Minister Albadé Abouba, and Finance Minister Ali Lamine Zeine—had held "very sensitive portfolios" under Tandja and therefore it was necessary "to ensure their security". Tandja's party, the MNSD, called for the three ministers, as well as Tandja, to be released.

Djibo was officially designated as head of state and head of government by a decree on 22 February. He then appointed Mahamadou Danda, who had been Minister of Communication during the transition that followed the 1999 coup, as Prime Minister on 23 February.

Mohamed Bazoum, one of the leading members of the CFDR, said on 23 February that his coalition wanted Tandja to be put on trial for high treason because he had abrogated the 1999 constitution in his efforts to remain in power. According to Bazoum, such a trial was necessary to deter future leaders from pursuing a similar course. He said that the junta should hold Tandja until "democratic institutions" were in place, and then Tandja should be tried, although he also said that he felt the death penalty would be unnecessary.

General Moumouni Boureima, who was Chief of Staff of the Armed Forces under Tandja, opposed the coup, and it was reported in the aftermath of the coup that his home was surrounded by tanks.

Speaking for the CSRD, Goukoye stated on 24 February that members of the CSRD and "any other transitional body" would not run in the planned election. He remained unwilling to specify a timetable for the election, saying that the dates would be determined through a consultative process. Goukoye also disclosed that six of Tandja's ministers, rather than three, were in detention, and that Morocco had offered asylum to Tandja.

On 1 March 2010, an interim government of 20 ministers was appointed. Five portfolios were assigned to officers, three of whom (including the Minister of Defense) were generals associated with Tandja. Former Prime Minister Gamatié was released along with five other former ministers on 4 March, but Tandja and Albadé Abouba remained in detention.

While Tandja's government consistently sought to downplay the problem of famine and hunger—to the point that it was considered "an almost taboo subject"—the CSRD quickly demonstrated a different approach. On 10 March, Prime Minister Danda issued "an emergency appeal" to the international community for aid. According to Danda, 58% of the population could be affected by lack of food; under Tandja, the number had been placed much lower, at about 20%. Danda discussed the government's plans for emergency relief, and the UN and EU both promised assistance.

Moctar Kassoum, who had served as Minister of Communications and Government Spokesman before the coup, was arrested on 15 March after "he urged people to fast and to organise prayers to call on God" in order to seek the release of Tandja and Abouba. He had also accused the CSRD of hypocrisy in continuing to hold Tandja and Abouba in detention while talking about reconciliation. Kassoum was reportedly arrested for "breaching public order" through his comments, but the junta released him on 18 March.

During its last months in power, Tandja's government had initiated legal charges against the main opposition leaders, forcing them to live in exile. Under the CSRD, the charges were abandoned and the opposition leaders were encouraged to return home. The key opposition leader Mahamane Ousmane—who was President of Niger from 1993 to 1996 and President of the National Assembly from 1999 to 2009—returned to Niger "discreetly" on a flight from Abuja on 24 March 2010.

On 29 March 2010, the CSRD arrested numerous high-ranking associates and loyalists of Tandja. According to Ousmane Cissé, the Minister of the Interior, they were arrested because they were involved in "subversive activities and undermining of the government and the transition process". Those arrested included Seyni Oumarou, the President of the MNSD; under Tandja, he had been Prime Minister from 2007 to 2009 and then briefly served as President of the National Assembly prior to the coup. Others who were arrested included Garba Lompo (Justice Minister), Lamido Moumouni (Equipment Minister), and the previously released Ali Lamine Zeine (Finance Minister). Kassoum, who had been released 11 days beforehand, was arrested again. Several heads of state-run companies were also arrested. Cissé stressed that any activity aimed at undermining the government or stirring unrest would be punished: "The state now cannot tolerate these practices to undermine the CSRD's efforts to reconcile Nigeriens."

On 1 April, 20 Tandja-appointed state company officials—including the heads of the state mining company, SOPAMIN, and the state petroleum import company, SONIDEP—were replaced in their posts. The CSRD released the 14 arrested Tandja loyalists the next day. Cissé, the Interior Minister, said that their "destabilisation operation" had been "neutralised" and that the suspects were being released "to calm things down".

Djibo appointed a committee to draw up a draft constitution on 21 April 2010. It was to complete its work within 45 days. The Consultative Council, another body established by the CSRD, then announced a proposed timetable for the transitional process on 23 April 2010. According to the timetable, a series of votes would begin on 24 October 2010, when the referendum on a new constitution would be held; the constitution, if approved by the referendum, would be promulgated on 11 November. The first round of the presidential and parliamentary elections would be held on 26 December 2010, and the results would be proclaimed on 12 January 2011. The second round of the presidential election, along with local elections, would follow on 26 January 2011; results for the presidential second round would be announced on 12 February 2011, the National Assembly would begin sitting for its parliamentary term on 14 February 2011, and results for the local elections would be announced on 27 February 2011. The process would then conclude with the swearing in of the newly elected president on 1 March 2011.

The CSRD announced on 5 May 2010 that it accepted the Consultative Council's proposal to set the length of the transition as one year, although it said that the electoral processes would be held in a different sequence (referendum, local elections, parliamentary election, presidential election). January 3 and 14 were set for presidential elections, while January 3 would be a legislative election.

== International reaction ==
- United Nations: In New York, U.N. Secretary-General Ban Ki-moon condemned the coup, reiterating "his disapproval of unconstitutional changes of government as well as attempts to remain in power through unconstitutional means", U.N. deputy spokeswoman Marie Okabe said.
- African Union: An AU official, Mull Sebujja Katende, stated that: "As of today, Niger will not participate in our activities. We have condemned the coup and imposed sanctions on Niger: Niger is suspended from all activities of the A.U." African Union chief Jean Ping condemned the coup and expressed concern.
- Senegal: Senegal's Foreign Affairs Minister Madicke Niang told reporters in Niamey that ECOWAS was "hoping for a peaceful transition after the events of the last few days".
- Libya: Libyan leader Muammar Gaddafi sent an envoy asking for guarantees that Tandja and his family would not be harmed.
- United States: State Department spokesman Philip Crowley said "This is a difficult situation [...] President Tandja has been trying to extend his mandate in office. And obviously, that may well have been [...] an act on his behalf that precipitated this act today." Crowley emphasized that the U.S. had little information about the exact nature of the coup, and that Niger needs to hold elections to form a new government. The United States called for a "speedy return to democracy".
- France: Foreign ministry spokesman Bernard Valero stated, "France condemns the taking of power by non-constitutional means". France, of which Niger is a former colony, also demanded fresh elections "in the coming months".

== Referendum and elections in 2010–2011 ==
In late 2010 the Supreme Council for the Restoration of Democracy organized a constitutional referendum. In early 2011 general election was held. Former opposition leader Mahamadou Issoufou was elected as president.

=== 2011 coup attempt ===
In July 2011, ten military officers were arrested for plotting a coup and assassination of President Issoufou. The assassination attempt was alleged to be planned for 16 July at an event marking the first 100 days of Issofou in office. It is often believed that the coup attempt was rooted in dissatisfaction with efforts by Issoufou to root out corruption in the military.

== See also ==
- 1974 Nigerien coup d'état
- 1996 Nigerien coup d'état
- 1999 Nigerien coup d'état
- 2023 Nigerien coup d'état
