= Nigerien Patriotic Movement =

Political party in Niger

The Nigerien Patriotic Movement (French: Mouvement patriotique nigérien, MPN-KIISHIN KASSA) was a political party in Niger.

== History ==
The party was launched on 8 November 2015 by former minister Ibrahim Yacouba after he was expelled from the ruling Nigerien Party for Democracy and Socialism.

Yacouba was the party's presidential candidate in the 2016 general elections. Although he failed to advance to the second round, the MPN won five seats in the National Assembly.
