= Salou Djibo =

Military leader of Niger from 2010 to 2011

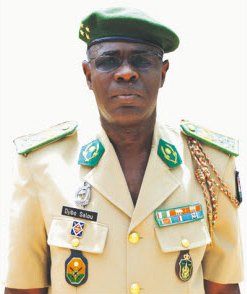
- Djibo in 2010

8th President of Niger Supreme Council for the Restoration of Democracy
- In office 18 February 2010 – 7 April 2011
- Prime Minister: Mahamadou Danda
- Preceded by: Mamadou Tandja (President)
- Succeeded by: Mahamadou Issoufou (President)

Personal details
- Born: 15 April 1965 (age 61) Namaro, Niger
- Party: Peace, Justice, Progress; Supreme Council for the Restoration of Democracy
- Spouse: Fati Alzouma Djobo Salou

Military service
- Allegiance: Niger
- Branch/service: Nigerien Army
- Rank: Army corps general

Salou Djibo (born 15 April 1965) is a Nigerien Army officer. After President Mamadou Tandja's attempts to remain in power beyond his term, Djibo led the military coup of 18 February 2010 that ousted Tandja, after which he became the head of the Supreme Council for the Restoration of Democracy. The Supreme Council returned power to a new civil government after the 2011 elections.

== Early and family life ==
Salou Djibo was born in 1965 in Namaro, a village and rural commune in Niger close to the River Niger. He is of Zarma ancestry. Djibo is married to Fati Alzouma Djobo Salou and has five children.

== Military career ==
In 1995, Djibo underwent military training in Bouaké, Côte d'Ivoire, before commencing officer training in 1996. He was commissioned as a second lieutenant in 1997 and gained further promotions to lieutenant in 1998, captain in 2003 and chef d'escadron (major) in October 2006. Djibo has also received training in Morocco and China.

Amongst Djibo's several posts, he was an instructor at the Agadez military center, platoon commander, commandant, 121 Compagnie de Commandement d'Appui et des Services, and commander of the garrison at Niger's capital Niamey.

Djibo served in United Nations peacekeeping forces in Côte d'Ivoire (2004) and the Democratic Republic of the Congo (2006).

== 2010 coup ==
His military government announced its intentions to make Niger "a model of democracy and good governance."

== Presidential campaign ==
Djibo announced that he would be running as a candidate in the 2020 Nigerien presidential election.

== See also ==
- 1974 Nigerien coup d'état
- 1996 Nigerien coup d'état
- 1999 Nigerien coup d'état
- 2009–10 Nigerien constitutional crisis
- 2010 Nigerien coup d'état
- Mahamadou Danda
- Mamadou Tandja
- Seyni Oumarou

Political offices
Preceded by Mamadou Tandja as President of Niger	Chairman of the Supreme Council for the Restoration of Democracy of Niger; 2010–2011	Succeeded by Mahamadou Issoufou as President of Niger
