= Timeline of Niamey =

The following is a timeline of the history of the city of Niamey, Niger.

== 20th century ==
- 1902
  - Village designated seat of administrative cercle of Djerma.
  - French school opens.
- 1922 - Administrative cercle of Niamey created.
- 1926 - Seat of French colonial Colonie du Niger relocated to Niamey from Zinder "in order to facilitate trade with other French colonies along the Niger River."
- 1931 - Jules Brevie Hospital established.
- 1932 - Catholic church built.
- 1937 - "Urban Development Plan" created.
- 1942 - Roman Catholic diocese of Niamey established.
- 1953
  - Le Niger newspaper begins publication.
  - Archives Nationales du Niger headquartered in Niamey.
- 1956 - Djibo Bakary becomes mayor.
- 1958 - Radio Niger begins broadcasting.
- 1959
  - December: Musée National du Niger (museum) opens.
- 1960 - City becomes part of newly independent Republic of Niger.
- 1961 - Le Temps du Niger newspaper begins publication.
- 1962
  - Lycée La Fontaine (school) established.
  - Population: 40,000 (estimate).
- 1964 - Télé Sahel (television) begins broadcasting.
- 1965
  - 13 April: President Diori attacked.
  - Centre Culturel Franco-Nigérien inaugurated.
- 1967 - Office of Radio and Television of Niger headquartered in Niamey.
- 1968 - Société des Mines de l'Air headquartered in city.
- 1970s - Grand Mosque of Niamey built.
- 1970
  - Kennedy Bridge opens.
  - Agence de Cooperation Culturelle et Technique headquartered in city.
- 1971 - Centre d'Enseignement Superieur (college) founded.
- 1972 - Airport opens.
- 1973
  - University of Niamey active.
  - Tillabéri-Niamey road constructed.
- 1974
  - Le Sahel and Sahel Dimanche newspapers in publication.
  - Olympic FC de Niamey (football club) formed.
  - Telephone ministry headquarters built.
- 1977 - Population: 225,314.
- 1982
  - 30 March: Central Market burns down.
  - Niamey Literacy Center built.
  - American International School of Niamey built.
- 1984 - Urban development plan created.
- 1985 - Court of Appeals building constructed.
- 1986 - Niamey Grand Market built.
- 1988 - Population: 397,437.
- 1989
  - City becomes the "Niamey Urban Community," containing administrative Commune I, Commune II, and Commune III.
  - Stade Général-Seyni-Kountché (stadium) opens.
- 1990 - February: Student economic protest; crackdown.
- 1991 - Le Républicain newspaper begins publication.
- 1996
  - 27 January: 1996 Nigerien coup d'état occurs.
  - Sociéte Nigerienne de Transports de Voyageurs headquartered in city.
- 1997 - United Nations Economic Commission for Africa Subregional Development Centre for West Africa headquartered in Niamey.
- 1998 - Nigerien hip hop musical style develops in Niamey.
- 1999 - 9 April: President Maïnassara assassinated.

== 21st century ==
- 2001 - Population: 707,951.
- 2002
  - August: Military mutiny; crackdown.
  - Administration of Niamey Urban Community reorganized into Commune I, Commune II, Commune III, Commune IV, and Commune V.
- 2005 - 2005 Jeux de la Francophonie sport/cultural event held in Niamey.
- 2006
  - June: 2006 Abdou Moumouni University protests.
  - Areva NC Niger headquartered in city.
- 2007 - Dounia TV begins broadcasting.
- 2009 - Population: 943,055 (estimate).
- 2010
  - 18 February: 2010 Nigerien coup d'état occurs.
  - August: 2010 West African floods.
- 2011
  - Oumarou Dogari Moumouni becomes mayor of the Niamey Urban Community.
  - Kandadji Dam construction begins 180 km from Niamey; when completed will increase city power supply.
- 2012
  - August: Flood.
  - Population: 1,026,848.
- 2013
  - United States military drone base begins operating at airport.
  - December: Economic protest.
  - Assane Seydou becomes mayor of the Niamey Urban Community.
- 2014 - Niamey railway station opens.
- 2015 - 17–18 January: Protest against Parisian satirical publication Charlie Hebdo issue No. 1178.
- 2017 - August: Flood.
- 2021 - Coup attempt.
- 2023 - Coup.

== Images ==
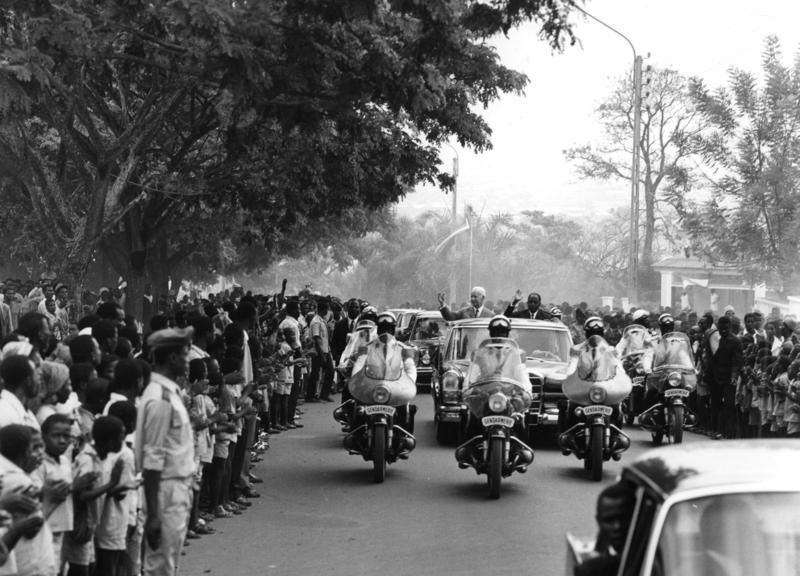
Heinrich Lübke, president of West Germany, visits Niamey, 1969

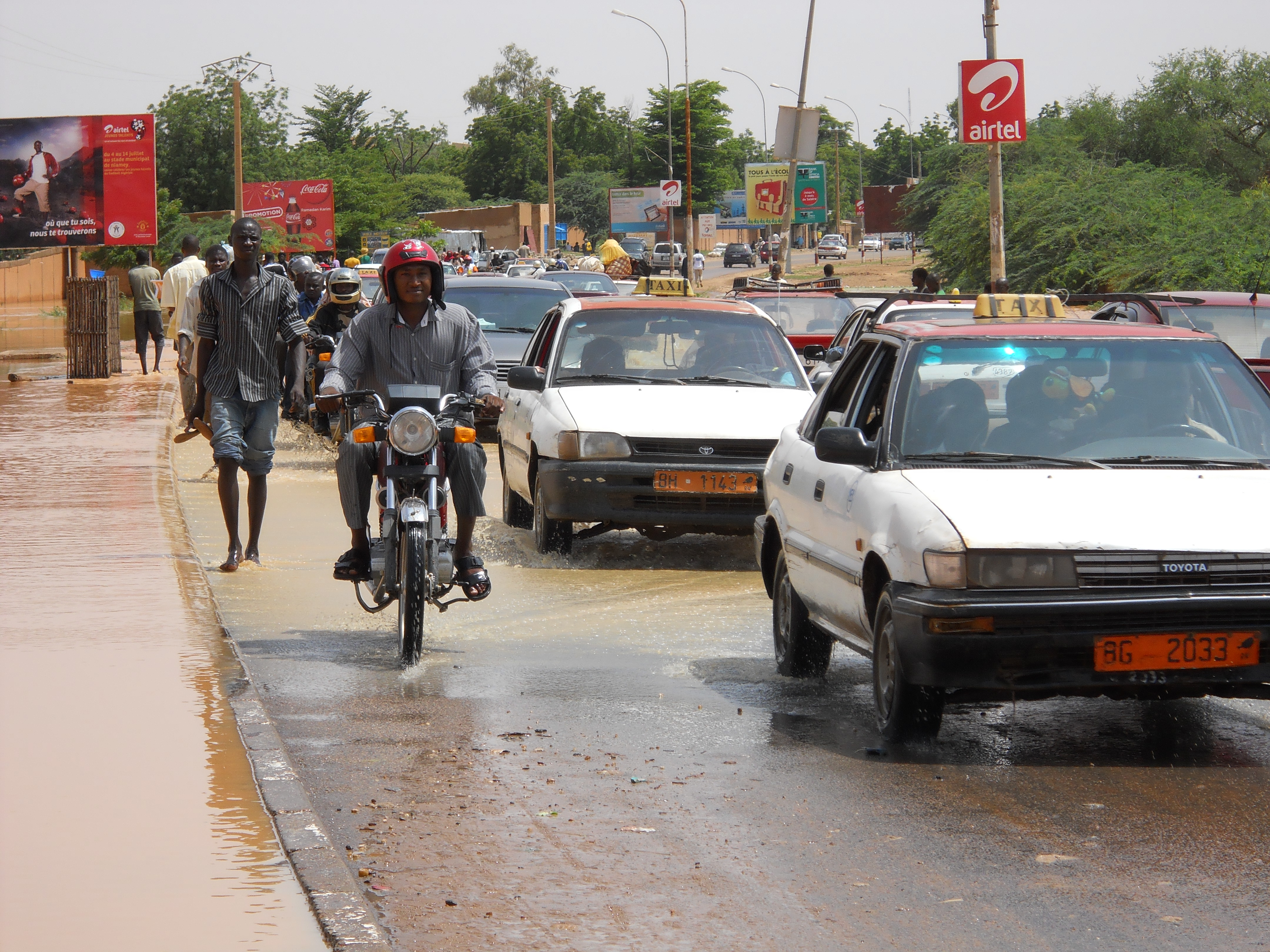
Flooded street in Niamey, August 2013

== See also ==
- Niamey history (de)
- Urbanization in Niger

== Bibliography ==
=== in English ===
- Paul Tiyambe Zeleza; Dickson Eyoh, eds. (2003). "Niamey, Niger". Encyclopedia of Twentieth-Century African History. Routledge. ISBN 978-0415234795.
- Elizabeth Heath (2010). "Niamey, Niger". In Kwame Anthony Appiah; Henry Louis Gates (eds.). Encyclopedia of Africa. Oxford University Press. ISBN 9780195337709.
- Roman A. Cybriwsky (2013). "Niamey". Capital Cities around the World: An Encyclopedia of Geography, History, and Culture. ABC-CLIO. p. 211. ISBN 978-1-61069-248-9.
- Claire Casse; et al. (2016). "Model-based study of the role of rainfall and land use–land cover in the changes in the occurrence and intensity of Niger red floods in Niamey between 1953 and 2012". Hydrology and Earth System Sciences. 20 (20): 2841–2859. Bibcode:2016HESS...20.2841C. doi:10.5194/hess-20-2841-2016.

=== in French ===
- Emmanuel Gegroire (1993). "Réseaux de pouvoir et contrôle urbain: l'exemple d'une ville moyenne au Niger, Maradi". In Sylvy Jaglin; Alain Dubresson (eds.). Pouvoirs et cités d'Afrique noire: Décentralisations en questions (in French). Paris: Éditions Karthala. ISBN 978-2-86537-455-7.
- Jean-Pierre Jambes (1996). "Typologie de l'espace urbain sahélien, le cas de la ville de Niamey". Cahiers d'Outre-Mer (in French). 49 – via Persee.fr.
- Kokou Henri Motcho (2004). "La réforme communale de la communauté urbaine de Niamey (Niger)" [Community restructuring within the Niamey urban area]. Revue de géographie alpine (in French). 92 – via Persee.
- A. Bontianti; et al. (2008). Gestion des déchets à Niamey. Études africaines (in French). Paris: L’Harmattan. ISBN 978-2-296-06483-6.
- Hamadou Issaka; Dominique Badariotti (2013). "Les inondations à Niamey, enjeux autour d'un phénomène complexe" [Floods in Niamey]. Cahiers d'Outre-Mer (in French). 66 (263): 295–310. doi:10.4000/com.6900 – via Revues.org.
