= Human rights in Niger =

According to the Republic of Niger's Constitution of 1999, most human rights, as defined by the Universal Declaration of Human Rights, are upheld and protected. Despite these protections, concerns of both domestic and international human rights organizations have been raised over the behavior of the government, military, police forces, and over the continuation of traditional practices which contravene the 1999 constitution. Under French colonial rule (1900–1960) and from independence until 1992, citizens of Niger had few political rights, and lived under arbitrary government power. Although the situation has improved since the return to civilian rule, criticisms remain over the state of human rights in the country.

== Constitution of 18 July 1999 ==
The Constitution of 18 July 1999, the founding document of the Nigerien Fifth Republic and the basis of its legal system, guarantees certain rights for every citizen of Niger. These include rights to equality before the law, due process, universal suffrage, freedom of speech, and freedom of religion.

- Title I, Article 9 states:

The same prerogatives shall be accorded every citizen of Niger enjoying full civil and political rights and fulfilling the conditions of eligibility as provided for by the law.

- Title II: Rights And Duties Of The Individual includes:

Article 23:Each person shall have the right to freedom of thought, opinion, expression, conscience, religion, and worship. The state shall guarantee the free exercise of worship and expression of beliefs. These rights shall be applicable in regard to public order, social tranquility, and national unity.

=== Human Rights offices ===
The constitution also created an official Nigerien National Commission on Human Rights and Fundamental Liberties to investigate and report upon human rights abuses. Its members are elected from several human rights associations, legal bodies, and government offices. It has no power to arrest, but it may investigate abuses either on its own volition or when charged by a victim. It reports to the President of Niger.

In August 2008, the government established a Mediator of the Republic. The mediator's role is to solve difficulties in the implementation and interpretation of laws and regulations. The president appoints the mediator, who is an independent administrative authority charged with investigating citizens' complaints and trying to find amicable solutions. The mediator has no decision-making powers, however, and instead submits results of investigations to the president and the prime minister.

== International conventions ==
Niger is a signatory of a number of international human rights conventions, including the African Charter on Human and Peoples' Rights of 1986, for which it submits regular reports to the African Union's African Commission on Human and Peoples' Rights. Niger is one of the States Parties to the Rome Statute of the International Criminal Court.

== History since independence ==
Niger has had four republican constitutions since independence in 1960, but four of its seven presidents have been military leaders, taking power in three coups. The first presidential elections took place in 1993 (33 years after independence), and the first municipal elections only took place in 2007. The 1999 constitution followed the coup against and murder of President Ibrahim Baré Maïnassara by fellow military leaders. Prior to the 1992 uprising that led to free elections, Nigeriens have had little say in their nation's governance. In 2004 Mamadou Tandja was elected to his second five-year presidential term in an election that international observers deemed generally free and fair.

While the 1999 constitution guarantees a right to free assembly, in practice the government places restrictions on political gatherings, especially at time of popular unrest. There have been three blanket states of emergency declared since 1999, the longest beginning in August 2007 for the entire Agadez Department, and renewed in November 2007. These states of emergency essentially remove all rights to protest, gathering and free movement. They also allow detention without charge or trial.

=== Security forces ===
The involvement of the military in politics has historically led to regular, if infrequent, arbitrary arrest and detention, use of excessive force, torture, and extra-judicial killing by security forces and police. The judiciary has historically suffered from poor jail and prison conditions, prolonged pretrial detention, and executive interference in the judiciary. While all these have improved dramatically since the return to civilian rule, international human rights organizations continue to report sporadic incidents of all these abuses. Post-1999 there has been a marked improvement of civilian control of security forces, with the United States State Department contending every year since 2001 that the military was under civilian control.

== Current concerns ==
The United States, in line with the United Nations and Amnesty International, has consistently found the post-1999 government's human rights record "generally poor; although there are improvements in several areas, some serious problems remain". With the 1999 election of President Tandja and members of the National Assembly in generally free and fair elections, citizens exercised their right to change their government. Since 2001, every year has seen less than a dozen prisoners die or go missing after having last been seen in the custody of military officers. Police and members of the security forces beat and otherwise abuse persons. Prior to the beginning of the Tuareg insurgency of 2007 the government has generally respected the right to association; however, several Islamist organizations that engaged in or threatened violence have been and remain banned. The government frequently restricts freedom of movement.

Domestic violence and societal discrimination against women continue to be serious problems. Female genital mutilation (FGM) persists, despite government efforts to combat it. There is societal discrimination against persons with disabilities and ethnic and religious minorities. Worker rights generally are respected; however, there are reports that a traditional form of servitude still is practiced. Child labor occurs, including child prostitution. There are reports of trafficking in persons.

=== Freedom of the press ===
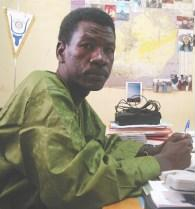
Journalist Moussa Kaka in Niger, prior to his 2007 arrest.

Niger has had a tradition of lively press opposition, punctuated by bouts of government repression. From 1999 to 2007, the independent press, especially radio has flourished. With the advent of the Second Tuareg Rebellion in 2007, the government has begun to prosecute under emergency powers, those foreign and domestic press who are accused of contact with rebel leaders, and have expelled members of the foreign press from the country. The north, under a state of emergency, has become a no-go zone for foreign press, and the independent Radio Agadez in the north has been closed by the government.

=== Media ===
Since literacy and personal incomes are both very low, radio is the most important medium of public communication. The government-owned Radio Voix du Sahel transmits 14 hours per day, providing news and other programs in French and several local languages. There are several private radio stations, including Radio France International, Africa Number One, Radio et Musique, Radio Souda, Radio Tenere, Radio Anfani, and Radio Tambara; the last five are owned locally and feature popular news programs in local languages, including Djerma and Hausa. These private radio stations generally are less critical of government actions than are the private newspapers. Radio Anfani and Radio et Musique presented news coverage that has included a variety of points of view. The other private domestic radio stations are smaller and offer little domestic news programming. The government-operated multilingual national radio service provides equitable broadcasting time for all legal political parties during the year.

The government publishes a French-language daily newspaper, Le Sahel, and its weekend edition. There are approximately 12 private French-language weekly or monthly newspapers, some of which are affiliated loosely with political parties. The private press remains relatively assertive in criticizing government actions, though since mid-2007, there have been a number of arrests of foreign and local journalist.

=== 2007–2008 crackdown ===
Two local journalists were imprisoned in 2007 under charge of aiding the Tuareg insurgency in the north, and several radio stations have been closed. The journalist Moussa Kaka was held over a year on charges stemming from a radio interview of Rebel leaders, before being provisionally released. Foreign journalist circulated and reported freely prior to mid-2007, but since have been restricted from reporting on or traveling to the north of the country (Agadez Region). Since this time radio re-broadcasts of foreign news services have been restricted, having previously been a staple of Nigerien news coverage.

While Moussa Kaka has received the longest imprisonment for a journalist since the beginning of the Tuareg based insurgency in February 2007, several other cases have come to the attention of the international media. French journalists Thomas Dandois and Pierre Creisson were detained in Agadez for a month in 2007 by Nigerien military forces before being released. The editor of the Niamey's L'Evénement weekly was arrested on 30 July 2008 and charged with "divulging a defence secret" after reporting that an army officer had been linked to an arms cache that was discovered in the capitol. The Government press regulation body, the High Council for Communication (CSC) closed Niamey based TV and radio station Dounia TV for one month in August 2008, and closed for an indefinite period Sahara FM, the main radio station in Agadez on 22 April 2008 for broadcasting interviews with people who had claimed they were the victims of abuses by government troops. In June 2007, Agadez weekly Aïr-Info was closed by the government for three months, while at the same time sending formal warnings to three other newspapers (Libération, L'Opinion and L'Evènement) for reporting on the conflict in the north, which the government said were "trying to justify criminal activity and violence." Aïr-Info editor Ibrahim Manzo Diallo, after attempting to open a new weekly paper, was arrested and released. One of his reporters was also arrested in Ingal in October, and in October Diallo was arrested trying to board a flight to Europe and charged with "membership of a criminal gang" Diallo was released pending trial in February 2008.

=== 2009 press arrests ===
In 2009, Reporters Without Borders and the International Federation of Journalists accused the government of Niger of carrying out repeated harassment of Nigerien journalists, following three high-profile arrests and libel cases brought against newspapers by members of the government and the arrest of two officials of Dounia TV for comments made by others on their station. Dounia, the only non-governmental Nigerien Television News station, has been accused of giving air time to supporters Hama Amadou, an imprisoned ruling party rival of the President of Niger. RSF claimed that "The Dounia group is the victim of repeated harassment by the judicial authorities".

=== Prison and detention center conditions ===
As of 2024, Niger's 41 prisons held 15,831 inmates living in poor and potentially life-threatening conditions. Sixty-two percent of detainees were held in pretrial detention and were mixed with convicted prisoners in the same cell blocks. The prison system is largely underfunded, understaffed, and chronically overcrowded; for example, Niamey's civil prison had an overcrowding rate of 400% in 2024. Family visits were permitted, and prisoners could receive supplemental food, medicine, and other necessities from relatives. However, nutrition, sanitation, and healthcare conditions remained poor, and deaths occurred from AIDS, tuberculosis, and malaria.

Corruption among prison staff is rampant. Some prisoners, known as the Sarki (meaning “chief” in Hausa) and his associates, exercise control within the prisons, collecting payments, enforcing disciplinary measures, and participating in the internal surveillance system under the supervision of the prison administration.

Human rights observers, including the International Committee of the Red Cross (ICRC), the Nigerien Commission on Human Rights and Fundamental Liberties, and various NGOs, used to be granted unrestricted access to prisons and detention centers and conducted visits during the year. However, since the 2024 military coup, access to prisons has been severely restricted.

=== Role of the Police and Security Apparatus ===
The armed forces, under the Defense Ministry, are responsible for internal and external security. The gendarmerie, also under the Defense Ministry, had primary responsibility for rural security. The national forces for intervention and security, under the Interior Ministry, are responsible for domestic security and the protection of high-level officials and government buildings, and the national police, also under the Interior Ministry, are charged with urban law enforcement.

The police are ineffective, primarily because of inadequate resources. Basic supplies such as vehicle fuel, radios, uniforms, handcuffs, batons, and badges are scarce. Patrols are sporadic, and emergency response time in Niamey can take 45 minutes. Police training is minimal, and only specialized police units had basic weapons-handling skills. Corruption remains pervasive. Citizens complain that security forces do not adequately police border regions. The gendarmerie is responsible for investigation of police abuse; however, impunity is often a problem.

=== Freedom of religion ===
The constitution provides for freedom of religion, and the government generally respects this right in practice. Nigerien society, although predominately Muslim, is respectful and tolerant of religious difference.

Islam is the dominant religion and the Niger Islamic Council, which acts as an official advisory committee to the government on religious matters, broadcasts biweekly on the government controlled television station. On government controlled media, Christian programs generally are broadcast only on special occasions, such as Christmas and Easter, although the independent media regularly broadcast such programs.

Foreign Christian missionaries, while generally viewed with suspicion, operate openly and unmolested. Most large cities, due to the legacy of French colonialism, contain Christian churches and small Christian communities. There is also a small community of the Baháʼí Faith in Niamey. Sharia law, though observed by more pious Nigeriens, is not enforced by government or community. Alcohol is sold openly and women, while generally dressing modestly, need not wear headscarves.

Religious organizations must register with the Interior Ministry. Registration is a formality, and there are no reports that the government refused to register a religious organization.

On February 10, 2006, the government established the Niger Islamic Council composed of 10 leaders drawn from Islamic associations including the Islamic Association of Niger and other NGOs, and 10 members from various government agencies. The Islamic Council advises the government on Islamic issues including preaching, mosque construction, payment of zakat, etc. The council's avowed goals are to "work toward promoting a culture of tolerance and social peace and encourage Nigeriens to participate in the country's economic, social, and cultural development." During the installation of the council, the prime minister said that the purpose of the council was in part "to address behaviors and practices inspired by foreign countries", a remark widely interpreted to mean Nigerian and Middle-Eastern-inspired theological change and mosque construction projects.

== Diffa Arabs expulsions, 2006 ==
In October 2006, Niger announced that it would deport the Arabs living in the Diffa Region of eastern Niger to Chad. This population numbered about 150,000. While the government was rounding up Arabs in preparation for the deportation, two girls died, reportedly after fleeing government forces, and three women suffered miscarriages. Niger's government had eventually suspended a controversial decision to deport Arabs.

== Slavery ==
In Niger, where the practice of slavery was outlawed in 2003, a study has found that more than 800,000 people are still slaves, almost 8% of the population. Slavery dates back for centuries in Niger and was finally criminalised in 2003, after five years of lobbying by Anti-Slavery International and Nigerien human-rights group, Timidria.

Descent-based slavery, where generations of the same family are born into bondage, is traditionally practiced by at least four of Niger's eight ethnic groups. The slave holders are mostly from the lighter-skinned nomadic ethnic groups — Tuareg, Fula, Toubou and Arabs. In the region of Say on the right bank of the river Niger, it is estimated that three-quarters of the population around 1904–1905 was composed of slaves.

Prior to the 20th century, the Tuareg captured slaves during raids into other communities and in war. War was then the main source of supply of slaves, although many were bought at slave markets, run mostly by indigenous peoples.

== Historical situation ==
The following chart shows Niger's ratings since 1972 in the Freedom in the World reports, published annually by Freedom House. A rating of 1 is "free"; 7, "not free".^{1}

Historical ratings

Year	Political Rights	Civil Liberties	Status	President^{2}
1972	6	6	Not Free	Hamani Diori
1973	6	6	Not Free	Hamani Diori
1974	7	6	Not Free	Seyni Kountché
1975	7	6	Not Free	Seyni Kountché
1976	7	6	Not Free	Seyni Kountché
1977	7	6	Not Free	Seyni Kountché
1978	7	6	Not Free	Seyni Kountché
1979	7	6	Not Free	Seyni Kountché
1980	7	6	Not Free	Seyni Kountché
1981	7	6	Not Free	Seyni Kountché
1982^{3}	7	6	Not Free	Seyni Kountché
1983	7	6	Not Free	Seyni Kountché
1984	7	6	Not Free	Seyni Kountché
1985	7	6	Not Free	Seyni Kountché
1986	7	6	Not Free	Seyni Kountché
1987	7	6	Not Free	Seyni Kountché
1988	6	6	Not Free	Ali Saibou
1989	7	6	Not Free	Ali Saibou
1990	6	5	Not Free	Ali Saibou
1991	6	5	Partly Free	Ali Saibou
1992	5	4	Partly Free	Ali Saibou
1993	3	4	Partly Free	Mahamane Ousmane
1994	3	5	Partly Free	Mahamane Ousmane
1995	3	5	Partly Free	Mahamane Ousmane
1996	7	5	Not Free	Ibrahim Baré Maïnassara
1997	7	5	Not Free	Ibrahim Baré Maïnassara
1998	7	5	Not Free	Ibrahim Baré Maïnassara
1999	5	5	Partly Free	Mamadou Tandja
2000	4	4	Partly Free	Mamadou Tandja
2001	4	4	Partly Free	Mamadou Tandja
2002	4	4	Partly Free	Mamadou Tandja
2003	4	4	Partly Free	Mamadou Tandja
2004	3	3	Partly Free	Mamadou Tandja
2005	3	3	Partly Free	Mamadou Tandja
2006	3	3	Partly Free	Mamadou Tandja
2007	3	4	Partly Free	Mamadou Tandja
2008	3	4	Partly Free	Mamadou Tandja
2009	5	4	Partly Free	Mamadou Tandja
2010	5	4	Partly Free	Salou Djibo
2011	3	4	Partly Free	Mahamadou Issoufou
2012	3	4	Partly Free	Mahamadou Issoufou
2013	3	4	Partly Free	Mahamadou Issoufou
2014	3	4	Partly Free	Mahamadou Issoufou
2015	3	4	Partly Free	Mahamadou Issoufou
2016	4	4	Partly Free	Mahamadou Issoufou
2017	4	4	Partly Free	Mahamadou Issoufou
2018	4	4	Partly Free	Mahamadou Issoufou
2019	4	4	Partly Free	Mahamadou Issoufou
2020	4	4	Partly Free	Mahamadou Issoufou
2021^{4}	4	4	Partly Free	Mohamed Bazoum
2022	4	4	Partly Free	Mohamed Bazoum
2023	6	4	Partly Free	Mohamed Bazoum

== International treaties ==
Niger's stances on international human rights treaties are as follows:

International treaties

Treaty	Organization	Introduced	Signed	Ratified
Convention on the Prevention and Punishment of the Crime of Genocide	United Nations	1948	-	-
International Convention on the Elimination of All Forms of Racial Discrimination	United Nations	1966	1966	1967
International Covenant on Economic, Social and Cultural Rights	United Nations	1966	-	1986
International Covenant on Civil and Political Rights	United Nations	1966	-	1986
First Optional Protocol to the International Covenant on Civil and Political Rights	United Nations	1966	-	1986
Convention on the Non-Applicability of Statutory Limitations to War Crimes and Crimes Against Humanity	United Nations	1968	-	-
International Convention on the Suppression and Punishment of the Crime of Apartheid	United Nations	1973	-	1978
Convention on the Elimination of All Forms of Discrimination against Women	United Nations	1979	-	1999
Convention against Torture and Other Cruel, Inhuman or Degrading Treatment or Punishment	United Nations	1984	-	1998
Convention on the Rights of the Child	United Nations	1989	1990	1990
Second Optional Protocol to the International Covenant on Civil and Political Rights, aiming at the abolition of the death penalty	United Nations	1989	-	-
International Convention on the Protection of the Rights of All Migrant Workers and Members of Their Families	United Nations	1990	-	2009
Optional Protocol to the Convention on the Elimination of All Forms of Discrimination against Women	United Nations	1999	-	2004
Optional Protocol to the Convention on the Rights of the Child on the Involvement of Children in Armed Conflict	United Nations	2000	-	2012
Optional Protocol to the Convention on the Rights of the Child on the Sale of Children, Child Prostitution and Child Pornography	United Nations	2000	2002	2004
Convention on the Rights of Persons with Disabilities	United Nations	2006	2007	2008
Optional Protocol to the Convention on the Rights of Persons with Disabilities	United Nations	2006	2007	2008
International Convention for the Protection of All Persons from Enforced Disappearance	United Nations	2006	2007	-
Optional Protocol to the International Covenant on Economic, Social and Cultural Rights	United Nations	2008	-	-
Optional Protocol to the Convention on the Rights of the Child on a Communications Procedure	United Nations	2011	-	-

== See also ==
- Indigénat, legal regime under French colonial rule.
- Internet censorship and surveillance in Niger
- Listings of Human rights indicators:
  - Abortion law: legal in cases of danger to mother only.
  - Timeline of women's suffrage: Female suffrage enacted in 1948
  - LGBT rights in Niger: laws are rather liberal, but homosexuality is completely taboo.
  - Use of capital punishment by nation: while not outlawed, Niger is rated as"Abolished in practice", with the last state execution taking place in 1976.
  - School leaving age: Children may leave compulsory education at 16, but may be employed legally at 14.
  - Legal drinking age: 18 years old. Though overwhelmingly Muslim, alcohol sales are not prohibited.
  - Freedom in the World (report) 2007 by the US based Freedom House rates Niger as "Partly Free"
  - The Democracy Index of the UK based Economist Magazine rates Niger as 122 of 167 and an "Authoritarian regime".
  - List of countries by Failed States Index 2007 by the US based Fund for Peace rates Niger as the 32nd from worst state in government ineffectiveness.
  - Corruption Perceptions Index rates Niger 132 of 179, with a 2.6 rating, improving since 2004.
- Migrants' African routes: Niger lies on a major route of undocumented migration from Sub-Saharan Africa to Europe.
- Slavery in modern Africa
- Timidria: Nigerien anti-slavery NGO

== Notes ==
1.Note that the "Year" signifies the "Year covered". Therefore the information for the year marked 2008 is from the report published in 2009, and so on.
2.As of January 1.
3.The 1982 report covers the year 1981 and the first half of 1982, and the following 1984 report covers the second half of 1982 and the whole of 1983. In the interest of simplicity, these two aberrant "year and a half" reports have been split into three year-long reports through interpolation.
4.On the Freedom House spreadsheet, the ratings for every country from North Macedonia through North Korea are applied to the country that precedes it alphabetically, with North Macedonia’s ratings (3 for both civil and political rights) being applied to North Korea. North Macedonia is listed as beginning with the letter “M” (as in “Macedonia, North”), whereas North Korea is listed as beginning with the letter “N”; hence, every country beginning with the letters "M" and "N" (excluding Norway) are affected.
