= LGBTQ rights in Niger =

- Niger
- Legal status: Illegal since 2025, codified in 2026.
- Penalty: 5 to 10 years imprisonment with a fine up to 100,000,000 CFA francs.
- Gender identity: No
- Military: No
- Discrimination protections: Limited protections based on sexual orientation

Family rights
- Recognition of relationships: No
- Adoption: No

Lesbian, gay, bisexual, transgender, queer, intersex and asexual (LGBTQIA) people in Niger face severe challenges not experienced by non-LGBTQIA residents. Same-sex sexual activity was explicitly outlawed in 2025 and penalized in 2026, and the Nigerien LGBTQIA community faces stigmatization among the broader population.

== Legal status ==
All "lesbian, gay, bisexual, transgender, queer, intersex, asexual (LGBTQIA+)" acts or practices ("pratiques") are currently criminalized based on Article 25 of Niger's "Charte de la Refondation" ("Refoundation Charter"), adopted in March 2025 by the country's ruling military junta. Even before this change, the age of consent was not equal for same-sex and opposite-sex sexual activity, being set at 13 for heterosexual acts and 21 for homosexual acts.

In February 2026, (Note: Niger's new criminal code was signed into law in February 2026 and came into effect on June 11, 2026.) Niger's new penal code proceeded to sanction "same-sex sexual relations" and "lesbian, gay, bisexual, transgender, queer, intersex, asexual (LGBTQIA+)" (Note: Niger's New Penal Code Enacted on February 16, 2026. Article 390 (in French): "Toute personne qui commet ou tente de commettre un acte impudique ou contre nature ou pratiques Lesbiennes, Gays, Bisexuelles, Transgenres, Queers, Intersexes, Asexuelles (LGBTQIA+), entretient ou tente d’entretenir des relations sexuelles avec une personne de même sexe, est punie d’un emprisonnement de cinq (05) ans à moins de dix (10) ans et d’une amende de dix millions (10.000.000) à cent millions (100.000.000) de francs CFA".) acts or practices ("pratiques") with penalties ranging from 5 to 10 years in prison with a fine up to 100 million CFA francs (€152 448,94; US$176,604.56). This includes same-sex sexual activity, the public announcement of one's romantic relationship with a person of the same sex, (Note: Niger's New Penal Code Enacted on February 16, 2026. Article 390 (in French): "Encourt la peine prévue au 1er alinéa du présent article, toute personne qui affiche publiquement sa relation amoureuse avec une personne de même sexe ou qui change ou tente de changer artificiellement son sexe de naissance".) and changing or attempting to change one's birth sex. What constitutes an asexual "practice" is unclear. Creating, managing, financing, participating in LGBTQIA+ organizations, clubs and social venues, directly or indirectly, is sanctioned with penalties ranging from 10 to 20 years in prison with a fine up to 500 million CFA francs (€762 244,71; US$882,829). (Note: Niger's New Penal Code Enacted on February 16, 2026. Article 392 (in French): "Toute personne qui gère, dirige, fait fonctionner, finance ou qui participe à des clubs, des sociétés, des organisations ou associations pour homosexuels ou LGBTQIA+, directement ou indirectement, est punie d’une peine d’emprisonnement de dix (10) à vingt (20) et d’une amende de cinquante millions (50.000.000) à cinq cent millions (500.000.000) de francs CFA".) Provisions regarding mitigating circumstances and suspended sentences cannot be applied.

Regarding the new criminal code and these measures in particular, Alio Daouda, Niger's Minister of Justice and Human Rights, stated that "all LGBTQ practices, whatever they may be (...) are not in line with our social and cultural values".

== Recognition of same-sex relationships ==
Niger does not legally recognize same-sex unions. Since March 2025, Niger defines marriage as a "union between a man and a woman" (Article 24 of Niger's "Charte de la Refondation"). Since June 2026, getting married with a person of the same sex, as well as officiating, organizing or bearing official witness to same-sex wedding(s), is sanctioned with penalites ranging from 10 to 20 years in prison. (Note: Niger's New Penal Code Enacted on February 16, 2026. Article 391 (in French): "Quiconque contracte un mariage avec une personne de même sexe, est puni d’un emprisonnement de dix (10) ans à vingt (20) ans. La même peine est applicable aux personnes ayant officié le mariage, aux témoins des prétendus époux ainsi qu’aux personnes ayant donné leur accord pour la célébration du mariage et aux organisateurs".)

== Discrimination protections ==
There are no broad legal protections against discrimination based on sexual orientation or gender identity. However, some limited protections based on sexual orientation are in place:

- Article 95 of Law 2022-59 on the Protection of Personal Data, states: "The act, except (Note: Article 42 of Law 2022-59 states that the processing of data "revealing (...) racial, ethnic, or regional origin; family relationships; political opinions; religious or philosophical beliefs; trade union membership; sexual life; health; and morals" (...) is prohibited, "except in the following cases: (...) ⁃ when the processing is necessary for the establishment, exercise, or defense of a legal claim in the context of legal proceedings or a criminal investigation. In such cases, the processing of personal data is carried out solely for the purpose of establishing the facts or determining the truth". "This law pertains to any use of personal data by legal entities governed by public or private law, as well as by private individuals" (Article 3). (translated from French)) in the cases provided for in Article 42 of this law, of collecting and processing data that reveals racial, ethnic, or regional origin, parentage, political opinions, religious or philosophical beliefs, trade union membership, sexual life or sexual orientation, genetic data, or, more generally, data relating to the health of the person concerned shall be punishable by imprisonment of three months to five years and a fine of 5,000,000 to 50,000,000 CFA francs". In June 2025 the provision was published by the Ministry of Communication and New Information Technologies (MCNTI) of Niger.

Law 2015-36 on the Illicit Trafficking of Migrants prohibited discrimination (Art. 4) based on a number of personal conditions including sexual orientation, but said law was repealed in 2023 with a decree by President Abdourahamane Tiani; the Government stated all convictions handed down under that law, as well as their effects, are expunged, and that it "criminalized certain activities that are, by their nature, lawful".

== Living conditions ==
The U.S. Department of State's 2013 Human Rights Report found that gay men and lesbians experienced societal discrimination, with a strong pressure to conform to societal norms weighting on LGBT people, so that many lead socially acceptable lives in public while seeking "LGBT relationships" privately. According to said Report, two men caught naked in a parked car were arrested for "public indecency" and fined a small fee. There were no reports of violence based on sexual orientation or gender identity, and no documented cases of discrimination in employment, housing, education, health care or statelessness based on sexual orientation; stigma or intimidation probably prevented incidents from being reported. Two gay rights organizations reportedly operated in secret, partly because they were not formally registered.

Niger saw its first LGBTQ public demonstrations in 2022 in Niamey, as a small group of asylum seekers from Cameroon, Liberia and Côte d’Ivoire issued a protest in front of the Office of the High Commissioner for Refugees and spoke of their own sexual orientation, their living conditions, and of how homophobia was still affecting them. According to a local correspondent, this challenged Niger's usually "discreet" attitude towards LGBTQ issues, even though male prostitution was prevalent in Niamey, and "effeminate" men were known for having always been part of Niger's culture by organizing traditional wedding ceremonies, supporting themselves that way. Niger's authorities would not recognise the protesters' refugee status, thus hindering their relocation, and they faced societal discrimination such as shops refusing to serve them, and verbal or physical violence from strangers.

In Maradi two young women were prosecuted in relation to lesbianism in 2022, but were acquitted due to a lack of legislation against same-sex relationships at the time; however they were sent to prison for two years for posting their nude videos on social media allegedly portraying a lesbian act. Shortly after, Nana Djibou Harouna, a lawmaker from the region of Maradi, presented to the Parliament a proposal to outlaw same-sex relationships.

President Mohamed Bazoum in 2023 proposed some drastic anti-LGBTQ measures that would adapt the French-derived Penal Code to the "economic and social realities" of Niger, with public discourse focusing on "social contagion".

Two young women, referred to as "lesbians" by the media, were reported by a third person in 2025 in Niamey. They were prosecuted for "public indecency", but were acquitted because the facts did not pertain to "the public sphere" (at the time, the 2025 Refoundation Charter was in place, but no penalties for homosexuality had been codified yet). This caused a widespread debate, ranging from approval to outrage. The judge was allegedly sanctioned for being too lenient.

With the 2026 Penal Code sanctioning homosexuality and all "LGBTQIA+ practices", local media reported that dozens of people were arrested across the country, some imprisoned, including some military officials. LGBTQ people went into hiding and organizations providing HIV prevention services to MSM stopped working, with a representative warning about the harm of people no longer having access to condoms, HIV testing or PrEP.

== Summary table ==
| Same-sex sexual activity legal | No Illegal since 2025, codified since 2026. (Penalty: 5 to 10 years imprisonment with a fine up to 100,000,000 CFA francs) |
| Equal age of consent | No |
| Anti-discrimination laws in hate speech and violence | No |
| Anti-discrimination laws in employment | No |
| Anti-discrimination laws in the provision of goods and services | No |
| Same-sex marriage | No Constitutional ban since 2025, sanctioned since 2026. (Penalty: 10 to 20 years imprisonment) |
| Recognition of same-sex couples | No |
| Step-child adoption by same-sex couples | No |
| Joint adoption by same-sex couples | No |
| Gays and lesbians allowed to serve openly in the military | No |
| Right to change legal gender | No Illegal since 2025, attempt to change one's birth sex sanctioned since 2026. (Penalty: 5 to 10 years imprisonment with a fine up to 100,000,000 CFA francs) |
| Access to IVF for lesbians | No |
| Commercial surrogacy for gay male couples | No |
| MSMs allowed to donate blood | No |

== See also ==
- Human rights in Niger
- LGBTQ rights in Africa
