= Moussa Kaka =

Nigerien journalist

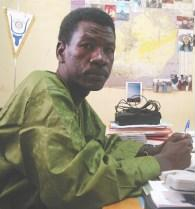
- Kaka prior to his 2007 arrest
- Occupation: Broadcast journalist
- Years active: 1993–present
- Known for: Political imprisonment

Moussa Kaka is a Nigerien radio journalist and director of Maradi based station Saraounia FM, as well as a correspondent for France's Radio France International. He has twice been arrested by the government of President Mamadou Tandja over his reporting. He was at the center of a 2008 court case by the Nigerien government over his 2007 interviews of Movement of Nigeriens for Justice (MNJ) rebels.

== Journalistic career ==
In 1993, Moussa became Niger correspondent for France's Radio France International. At that time he was a print journalist for the Niamey based independent newspaper Le Républicain-Niger. In 2002, Kaka was named news director Saraounia FM, a radio station in the regional capitol of Maradi, where he had been employed since 2000. Niger has a strong radio press, as high illiteracy rates and low television broadcast coverage make it the dominant news medium for much of the nation. Despite instances of arrest and detention of journalists, West African observers generally judge Nigerien press to be independent and lively in attacking the government.

== 2002 arrest ==
In 2002, Kaka was arrested for his reporting of a Nigerien Armed Forces mutiny in the regional capital of Diffa at the beginning of August 2002. On 23 August, Kaka was arrested and questioned at Niamey's Gendarmarie central headquarters In this instance he was released, along with several other journalists, within days. The Nigerien government said that journalists were being investigated for breach of laws covering "the dissemination, by any communications means, of reports or allegations liable to cast doubt on national defence operations." Kaka was also singled out in a national statement by the government. A public television broadcast during the coup attempt called Kaka and managing editor of Le Républicain Mamane Abou "stateless persons [...] working for the opposition".

== 2007-2008 arrest ==
In early 2007, a Tuareg based insurgency began in the north of the country. Tensions with foreign press ensued, and journalists were banned from reporting from the northern Agadez Region in June 2007. Kaka, as Radio France International's correspondent, was especially affected. RFI was banned from reporting from or broadcasting in Niger in June, as the government claimed they were biased towards the rebels. Kaka publicly claimed that his life was threatened on 14 July by the head of the Niger Armed Forces General Moumouni Boureima at a reception at the home of the French Ambassador to Niger.

On 20 September 2007, Kaka was arrested after conducting three telephone interviews one of the leaders of the Niger Movement for Justice (MNJ), one of the rebel groups, during his work as Niger correspondent of Radio France International. The Government of Niger recorded these telephone conversations and arrested Kaka for "complicity in endangering the security of the state". These charges correspond to treason, and carry a maximum penalty of life imprisonment. The initial charges were accepted, but the State Prosecuting Magistrate for the Niamey Region on 16 November 2007 refused to accept taped conversations as evidence, on the grounds that they were obtained illegally. The Nigerien Supreme Court conversely ruled in February 2008 that these tapes could be used as evidence. The Court further ruled that Kaka's rights were not breached by either the surveillance, the detention without trial, or the nature of the charges. On 23 June 2008, the prosecuting Magistrate ruled the Kaka could be provisionally released pending trial, a ruling that was immediately appealed by the government, meaning that the defendant remained imprisoned. One month later, the Magistrate ordered that his office drop all charges against Kaka, a ruling which the government also immediately appealed. On 19 August, the Niamey Appeals Court overturned the Magistrate's decisions. In September 2008, the State Prosecuting Magistrate for the Niamey Region proposed that Kaka's charges again be dropped and instead he be charged with "a breach of national territorial integrity through an entente with MNJ rebels", a lesser charge, but one which carries a maximum penalty of 10 years imprisonment.

On 7 October 2008 he was freed by the Niamey Magistrate's court provisionally, while awaiting trial.

=== International campaign ===
Kaka has been at the center of a campaign in France and elsewhere demanding his freedom, spearheaded by Radio France International and its CEO Alain de Pouzilhac, Reporters Without Borders (both organisations for which Kaka is Niger Correspondent) and Amnesty International, as well as Nigerien press groups including The Nigerien National Union of Press Workers (SYNATIC) and Le Republicain newspaper.

=== Other government actions ===
While Kaka has received the longest imprisonment for a journalist since the beginning of the Tuareg rebellion in February 2007, several other cases have come to the attention of the international media. French journalists Thomas Dandois and Pierre Creisson were detained in Agadez for a month in 2007 by Nigerien military forces before being released. The editor of the Niamey's L'Evénement weekly was arrested on 30 July 2008, charged with “divulging a defence secret" after reporting that an army officer had been linked to an arms cache that was discovered in the capital. The Government press regulation body, the High Council for Communication (CSC) closed Niamey based TV and radio station Dounia TV for one month in August 2008, and closed for an indefinite period Sahara FM, the main radio station in Agadez on 22 April 2008 for broadcasting interviews with people who had claimed they were the victims of abuses by government troops. In June 2007, Agadez weekly Aïr-Info was closed by the government for three months, while at the same time sending formal warnings to three other newspapers (Libération, L’Opinion and L'Evènement) for reporting on the conflict in the north, which the government said were “trying to justify criminal activity and violence.” Aïr-Info editor Ibrahim Manzo Diallo, after attempting to open a new weekly paper, was arrested and released. One of his reporters was also arrested in Ingal in October, and in October Diallo was arrested trying to board a flight to Europe and charged with "membership of a criminal gang" Diallo was released pending trial in February 2008.

== Since imprisonment ==
In 2011, Kaka spoke positively of the Mahamadou Issoufou government, which had been elected in February of that year The Supreme Council for the Restoration of Democracy, a military junta which preceded Issoufou and aimed to restore democracy to the nation, made bad journalism and regulatory issues into civil matters (rather than political or judicial).

== 2025 arrest ==
In October 2025, Kaka was arrested in Niamey alongside five other journalists, including Abdoul Aziz Idé, Ibro Chaibou, Souleymane Brah, Youssouf Seriba and Oumarou Kané after they reported on a news briefing in which the Nigerien government announced plans to establish a solidarity fund to raise money to support state security operations. Kaka was charged with "complicity in distributing documents likely to disturb public order". In November 2025, Kaka was released on bail.

== 2026 disappearance ==
At around 19:00 on 31 August 2026, Kaka left his office at Radio Télévision Saraounia in Niamey to return home. This was the last time he was seen, with his family and colleagues unable to get hold of him.

On 25 September, the Minister of Justice, Alio Daouda announced during Niger's Universal Periodic Review at the United Nations in Geneva, Switzerland that Kaka had been detained for "an offence" and that he would be presented before a court.

== See also ==
- Tuareg rebellion (2007–2009)
- Media of Niger
