= Télé Sahel =

National television channel in Niger

- Country: Niger
- Broadcast area: Nationwide
- Headquarters: Niamey

Programming
- Languages: French, Hausa, Zarma, Berber language
- Picture format: 16:9 576i SDTV

Ownership
- Owner: Office of Radio and Television of Niger

History
- Launched: 1964
- Former names: Télévision Scolaire du Niger (1964-1979)

Links
- Website: www.ortn.ne

Availability

Terrestrial
- Analogue (SECAM): Channel 1

Télé Sahel is the national broadcaster of the West African state of Niger. Founded in 1964 as an educational channel under the name Télé-Niger, it became a national general channel, broadcasting in color, on April 6, 1979. Owned and operated by the government Office of Radio and Television of Niger, which also operates Radio Voix du Sahel and the Tal TV satellite station, Télé Sahel provides news and other programs in French and several local languages. Its stations transmit to all urban centres. Its current Director General is Moussa Saley since 2005.

The state ORTN network depends financially on the government, partly through an addition to electricity bills and partly through direct subsidy. The High Council for Communication also maintains a fund which supports private broadcasters, although its payments are criticised as political and irregular.

Télé Sahel was also used to broadcast the announcement of the 2023 Nigerien coup d'état.

== History ==
Niger launched its first (experimental) black-and-white television service in 1964, initially mainly as an educational and instructional tool for schools, called Télévision Scolaire du Niger, with technical assistance from ORTF and some of its programming imported from France.

Following the end of French subsidies to Télévision Scolaire du Niger in 1977, the Government of Niger decided to gradually convert the existing network into the country's first nationwide, generalist television channel, and at the same time introduce color television. Following a broadcasting trial during the 1978 FIFA World Cup, Télé Sahel was launched in its current form on 6 April 1979, initially broadcasting four days a week. Television broadcasts were then extended to the entire week in November 1988, originally for only four hours in the evening.

As of the early 2000s, Tele Sahel broadcast programs for 4 hours on weekday, up to 7 hours on weekends.

== Programming ==
ORTN Télé Sahel offers a diverse range of programming. News is a significant component, providing coverage of local, national, and international events. Télé Sahel's news broadcasts, delivered in French and local languages such as Hausa and Zarma, contribute to the dissemination of information across the country.

The station also prioritizes cultural and educational content and cultural programs. Cultural programs showcase traditional music, dance, and art forms. Educational programs encompass subjects such as health, agriculture, and social issues.

Télé Sahel presents a variety of entertainment shows, including dramas, sitcoms, and game shows.

Télé Sahel is available to viewers across Niger via terrestrial broadcast and satellite. It is the most popular and oldest TV station in the country. The first privately owned TV station, Dounia TV, wasn't launched until 2008.

== See also ==
- Media of Niger
