= Harouna Dabougui =

Nigerien artist and art educator

- Occupation: Artisan
- Known for: Development and teaching of figurative Batik in Niger

Harouna Dabougui is a Nigerien artist, artisan and art educator known for his work in the development and teaching of figurative batik in Niger. After receiving training in the technique at the educational centre of the Boubou Hama National Museum in the late 1970s, he became the first Nigerien artisan to teach figurative batik. His work contributed to the introduction of the technique into art education at the museum.

== Biography ==
=== Career ===
Dabougui received training in the technique at the educational centre of the Boubou Hama National Museum in the late 1970s, after which he became the first artisan in Niger known to have taught figurative batik, a dyeing technique using wax resist. He began working as a painting instructor at the educational centre of the National Museum of Niger in Niamey in 1976. In 1979, figurative batik was introduced at the museum's educational centre through a two-week training course given by American Peace Corps volunteers. The volunteers had themselves been trained by batik artists at the National Arts Centre in Ouagadougou, Burkina Faso. Dabougui participated in the course and subsequently continued practising the technique. Audrey Boucksom later described Dabougui as the first artisan in Niger to teach batik.

In the early 1980s, Harouna Dabougui won first prize at an exhibition held at the Centre Culturel Oumarou Ganda in Niamey. Furthermore, in 1999, through Dabougui's work, batik was incorporated into the educational programme of the museum's educational centre. Dabougui was also involved in introducing figurative batik to art education in Niger. Figurative batik was among several techniques introduced into Nigerien craft production through international training programmes, alongside developments in leatherworking and other forms of artisanal production.

He has also remained involved in arts education. In February 2024, he led a training session for Nigerien teachers on the educational use of drawing and conducted drawing workshops as part of the Projet Éducatif Niger.

== See also ==
=== Related articles ===
- Batik
- Arts and crafts
- Culture of Niger
