= High Council for Communication (Niger) =

Government body that regulates press and media in Niger

- Conseil Superieur de la Communication

Agency overview
- Formed: 1994
- Jurisdiction: Niger
- Agency executive: Government Agency, President
- Parent agency: Ministry of Communication

Footnotes
- A body that regulates press and media.

The High Council for Communication (Le Conseil Supérieur de la Communication, CSC) of the West African state of Niger is a government body which regulates press and media.

== 1960-1993 ==
Under the First Republic, the Military government of 1974-1989, and the transitional military led Second Republic, there was no press in Niger outside government sources. Consequently, there were no regulatory bodies prior to the press liberalisation which began in 1991-1993.

== Third Republic ==
The CSC was established under the Third Republic, and first began operations in 1994. Its first remit was to provide broadcast licenses for private electronic media, granting its first radio broadcast license to a local affiliate of Radio France International in February of that year. Under the Third Republic, the CSC oversaw the first legalisation of a free press in Niger's history and the creation of dozens of independent newspapers and radio stations. Legalisation of these was established by the a 30 March Ordnance by the new government (Ordonnance 93-29 du 30 mars 1993, JORN spécial n° 12 du 25 juin 1993). On 30 November 1993, authority to regulate and promote low power local radio was hived off to the authority of another committee, the Comité paritaire de pilotage des radios de proximité (CPRP) According to the 1993 laws, all radio frequencies are owned by the government. In 2007 regulations were updated in the same vein. This differentiates commercial from low power community radio, and places the CSC in charge of both. CSC regulations from 2007 includes licensing which bans all purely political or confessional broadcasters.

== Military rule and Fourth Republic ==
Following the Coup d'état of 1996, free press was again suspended. With the brief creation of the Fourth Republic, the CSC was formally abolished by Law N° 97-26 of 18 July 1997 and direct oversight of limited media was confirmed in Law N° 98-23 of 11 August 1998.

== Fifth Republic ==
Under the Constitution of the Fifth Republic (1999), the CSC is tasked as an authority "independent of political power" which is to guarantee equal access to the media by all political forces as well as liberty of the press. Its composition structure and powers, though, are constitutionally dependent upon current law. In 2006, the government adopted its most recent law on the CSC's power and structure (loi n° 2006-24 du 24 juillet 2006). This law mandates that the functioning of the CSC is dependent upon the decrees of the Council of Ministers, which in turn is at the approval of the President of Niger. As such its internal operations now falls under the Ministry of Communication. Between the Coup d'état of 1999 and the creation of the constitution, the CSC was replaced with another agency, the Observatoire nationale de la communication. This organisation was criticised by journalists as being to close to political leaders.

Following the 26 June declaring of emergency rule by President Tandja Mamadou, the CSC closed indefinitely Dounia TV, an independent TV and radio network close to the opposition. On 1 July, a press NGO statement claimed that six of the eleven CSC board members had signed a protest letter over both the closing, and the way in which the decision was taken. They claimed the board members were not consulted, but the sanction was simply taken by the chair without knowledge of the board.

== Membership ==
The constitutional makeup of the body is limited to a mandate that it be "independent". Under the Third Republic, the President of the Republic, the Speaker of the National Assembly and the President of the Supreme Court each appointed one of the CSC’s seven members. The four remaining members, all accredited journalists, were appointed by the private sector (1) and "the most representative organizations" in the public sector (3). In 2006 there were 12 appointed members, all but one government appointees. Its current president, appointed in 2007, is Daouda Diallo. From 2003 to 2007, the CSC president was former state radio broadcaster Mariama Keita, the first woman to hold the post.

== Independence ==
Both the independence and scope of powers of the CSC has been questioned by domestic and foreign observers. The Committee to Protect Journalists has flatly stated that in 2006 "Authorities also used the state-controlled High Council on Communications, known by its French acronym, CSC, to censor the press." As long ago as 1992, journalist groups have called for the press to be governed by press bodies. In 1997, the CSC helped found the "Council of the Press" (Conseil de presse) as a professional accrediting body. In 2007, the Council created a statue of professional journalism, which the CSC is to use to govern press conduct, and which supeceds a code created by journalist organisations in 1997. Press organisations, such as the Union des journalistes privés nigériens (Ujpn), the Syndicat des agents de l’information (Sainfo) and the Association nigérienne des éditeurs de la presse indépendante (Anepi) criticise the Council as too dependent upon the CSC and the government.

== Powers ==
The CSC is the only body legally allowed to close media outlets, establish bans on reporting, and license television, radio, and newspaper reporting. It also oversees and disburses government funding for private media, through its "press assistance fund". It distributes press passes and accredits journalists. It functioning under the Third Republic was questioned, due to a perceived lack of resources. Journalists observing the CSC contrasted the vast, if vague scope of the CSC's powers, with its lack of personnel and funding, rendering it "unable to exercise its numerous powers", and charging that this served the interest of political control of the media.

Under the Fifth Republic it further is responsible for creating a professional committee of journalism in Niger, which in turn creates the "Charter of Professional Journalists of Niger" (Charte des Journalistes professionnels du Niger). This is the code which the CSC then uses to oversee and sanction the professional behaviour of journalists.

The CSC is the only government agency with the legal power to close radio stations, and it may do so only after receiving a complaint. Despite this, as recently as 2005 the government have closed radio outlets without recourse to the CSC. In this case, a private radio station publicised protests to tax increases, and although initial police closures were overturned, the CSC ordered the station to refrain from broadcasting political news, sports coverage, or commercials. Since the beginning of the Tuareg insurgency in the north, the CSC has closed a number of outlets, and pronounced blanket bans on coverage of certain topics in the media, and of reporting from the northern part of the nation. Specific stations have been suspended for the content of their coverage, the topics discussed in on air debates, or simply for reporting on the conflict in the north. Amnesty International has complained that these measures are in violation of Niger's commitments to International Law. In 2008, the CSC closed broadcaster Radio and Television Dounia for "not respecting the terms of reference": according to the Committee to Protect Journalists, this was a reference to the broadcaster's coverage of the ongoing split in the ruling MNSD-Nassara, where supporters of former chair Hama Amadou are in a power struggle with President Mamadou Tandja. The International Federation of Journalists has declared that in this case "The High Council of Communication should play its role of regulating the media in the country but it should follow proper procedures... The CSC has not justified its ban on this network and its action is confused, unclear and dangerous for media freedom." The IFJ also reported that the CSC has been threatening to ban all the private newspapers whose directors don’t have a CSC issued press card.

Amidst the 2009 constitutional crisis, President Tandja decreed on 8 July 2009 that the President of the Council could "take any restraining measures without warning" against a media outlet that "publishes an article or broadcasts information that endangers state security or public order"; he would no longer need the approval of other members of the Council to take such actions.

== See also ==
- Media of Niger
- Human Rights in Niger
