= Niger Islamic Council =

Government body in Niger

The Niger Islamic Council (Conseil islamique du Niger, CIN) is a government mandated consultative and regulatory body of Muslim religious leaders and government representatives in the West African state of Niger. The 20 member body advises the government, secular under its 1999 constitution, of the regulation of Islamic festivals, organization of the hadj, protection of religious sites, Mosque construction, oversight of Muslim charities and schools, and the zakat.

== History ==
The CIN was proposed in 1999 at the founding of the Fifth Republic of Niger, formulated on 14 November 2003 (décret n2003-313/PRN/MID), and enacted on 10 February 2006. From 2007 it reports directly to the Minister of Religious Affairs. Its membership is made up of ten representatives of the largest Muslim associations in the nation, and ten political and administrative leaders proposed by the government.

The CIN is a successor organization of the 1974 Islamic Association of Niger (AIN), which itself succeeded the Islamic Cultural Association of Niger (f. 1960). Each of these organizations were created under single party governments to accredit and manage religious teaching and institutions, and each contained only representatives of the Sufi Muslim brotherhoods which form the majority of Niger's Islamic community. The dominant Sufi order in Niger is the Tijaniyya. With the coming of democracy in 1990, Muslim associations multiplied, including those representing religious minorities, and those funded by foreign groups, including Wahhabi groups funded by Saudi Arabia. The 1990s saw several sensational incidents of conflict between minority Muslim groups and both the government, more secular members of society, and the mainstream Sufi leaders.

== Mandate and actions ==
The council's mandate is to meet and advise the Government on issues of concern to Muslims, including preaching, mosque construction, and zakat. The council was also charged with promoting a culture of tolerance and social peace. During the installation of the council, Prime Minister of Niger Hama Amadou noted that the organization was also intended "to address behaviors and practices inspired by foreign countries." This remark was broadly interpreted to mean that the council would promote the practice of the moderate, tolerant Islam that the country has known for centuries, while countering extremist interpretations imported from, or influenced by, other Islamic countries. The minister of the interior also announced that a Christian council would be established in the near future.

The CIN sets the dates for religious observances, licenses religious education and training, and asserts the right to oversee sermons and the building of Mosques—although foreign governments have questioned their ability to do the last two in practice. The CIN oversees two religious broadcasts a week on state media, and pronounces on current events. It has notably helped organize relief and called for national prayer during the 2005 Niger food crisis, organized protests of Israel's military operation in the Gaza Strip in 2009, and released a joint statement with Nigerien Christian leaders opposing President of Niger Tandja Mamadou's plan to create a new constitution which would allow him to extend his term in office after 2009.

== See also ==
- Islam in Niger
