= 2009–2010 Nigerien constitutional crisis =

Political conflict leading to a coup d'état

The 2009–2010 Nigerien constitutional crisis occurred in Niger due to a political conflict between President Mamadou Tandja and judicial and legislative bodies regarding the Constitutional referendum that opponents claimed was an attempt to extend his mandate beyond the constitutional maximum. It was held on 4 August 2009 before a parliamentary election which was mandated to take place by 26 August 2009. The crisis eventually led to a coup d'état by military leaders who overthrew President Tandja and formed a ruling junta.

President Tandja dissolved the National Assembly of Niger on 26 May 2009 due to strong opposition from the National Assembly, civil society groups, and the courts regarding his referendum proposal. The Constitutional Court of Niger ruled on 12 June 2009 on a case brought by opposition deputies from the National Assembly that the proposed referendum was unconstitutional, and on 21 June 2009 the President announced he would not seek the 20 August vote. He left open the possibility he would propose future constitutional changes before the end of his mandate. On 26 June 2009 the President then dissolved the courts and announced he was assuming emergency powers.

His ministers then announced the 4 August referendum would go forward, despite previous refusals of courts, political parties, and the independent electoral commission to carry out the election.

== Campaign for presidential term extension ==
The proposal for a referendum was first floated in May 2009. Beginning in late 2008, several supporters of President Tandja began a campaign to extend his term of office. Opposition from political opponents was swift, with dueling marches in Niamey in December 2008. Supporters of Tandja to the slogan of his 2004 re-election campaign, "Tazarché", which means "Continuation" or "Continuity" in Hausa: supporters were quickly dubbed "Tazarchistes" and opponents "Anti-Tazarchistes". Demonstrations were held throughout Niger, while political committees were created, headed by supporters of Tandja outside government. The Tazarche committee was headed by Niamey politicians Boubacar Mazou and Anassara Dogari, and Tahoua based businessman Aboubacar Dan Dubaï In January the Prime Minister asserted that all elections would go on as scheduled, including the presidential election, which by law must take place before 22 December 2009, the five-year anniversary of Tandja's second five-year election as president. The 1999 constitution made the serving of more than two terms impossible (article 36), and the revision of that article illegal by any means (article 136). Prime Minister Seyni Oumarou reiterated on 22 January that all scheduled elections would go ahead before the end of 2009.

In March, during his meetings with French President Sarkozy, Tandja explicitly stated that he would not seek a third term.

Then, in early May 2009, when questioned by the press on his visit to Agadez to begin peace talks with Tuareg rebels, Tandja announced that "the people have demanded I remain." Thereafter it was announced he would seek a referendum to scrap the current constitution and create the Sixth Republic of Niger.

A series of protests followed, led by opposition party PNDS-Tarayya, but crucially containing a number of parties which had previously supported the government. These included the CDS, a party which enabled the ruling MNDS to form a majority in the National Assembly. The CDS announcement of opposition—-the last of the major parties to weigh in on the plan—on also left the President open to National Assembly votes to sanction him, or bring down the current government. In May 2009, in response to their parties opposition to a proposed referendum to allow the President to seek a third term, the three members of RDP-Jama'a and ANDP-Zaman Lahiya were replaced with ministers drawn from the MNSD-Nassara. The CDS continued to support the government while opposing the referendum plan

According to the 1999 Constitution of Niger, the President may call a referendum on any matter (except for a revision of those elements of the Constitution outlined in Article 136—including the presidential term limits). The Constitutional Court of Niger and the National Assembly of Niger must advise the president, but there is no provision that the president must heed their advice. On 25 May 2009, the Constitutional Court, made up of appointed judges, released a ruling that any referendum to create a new constitution would be unconstitutional, and further would be a violation of the oath the president had taken on the Koran (a serious matter in Niger, which is overwhelmingly Muslim). The week prior, two major parties had come out in their opposition to the referendum proposal as well. On 13 May, the ANDP-Zaman Lahiya, led by Moumouni Adamou Djermakoye, declared its opposition to any change in the constitution. On 15 May the CDS-Rahama, the party without which the MNSD could not have formed governments in 1999, 2004, and 2007, came out opposing the referendum, and calling the constitution unalterable. Neither party moved into the opposition, and both Ousmane and Djermokoye said they were willing to negotiate with the president.

On 26 May, within hours of the Constitutional Court's statement, official media read out a statement that President Tandja had dissolved the National Assembly. Under the 1999 Constitution he is allowed to do this once every two years, but he must call parliamentary elections within three months.

== Referendum plan ==
The full details of the referendum proposal were not finalized, but elements of the proposed constitution were outlined by government spokesmen and by a commission set up by the president to draft a proposed document. Tandja would extend his term for a transitional mandate of three years, during which a new constitution would be written and approved. The system of government would be changed from a semi-presidential system to a full presidential system, which Tandja claims is more stable. There would be no limit to presidential terms, and a bi-cameral legislature would be created with an upper house, the Senate.

On 5 June, the President and the Council of Ministers of Niger approved plans for the referendum, titled Referendum on the Project of the VIth Republic. Campaigning would take place from 13 July 2009 to 2 August 2009. The President established a commission to create a draft constitutional law upon which the population would vote. The Independent National Electoral Commission (CENI) was ordered to oversee preparations for voting. Electors would be able to choose "yes" or "no" to the text "Do you approve of the Constitutional project submitted for your assent?"

== Protests ==
Large opposition rallies were held in May and June, attended by a broad coalition of political parties, civil society groups and trades unions. These included Former Prime Ministers Hama Amadou and Mahamadou Issoufou, former president and current President of the Assembly Mahamane Ousmane, and former President of the Assembly and party leader, Moumouni Adamou Djermakoye. Moumouni Djermakoye died of a heart attack during the second of these rallies, on 14 June. These were followed by a threatened general strike of all seven of the main Nigerien trades union bodies, the first time these groups had announced a joint strike action. On 31 May a pro-referendum rally at the Governor's residence in the southern town of Dosso was attacked by a mob, and rioting lasted for several hours in the city center. Opposition was also voiced by the governments of the United States, Canada, the Economic Community of West African States (ECOWAS), and the President of Niger's neighbour and regional power Nigeria. ECOWAS threatened economic sanctions should Niger change the constitution within six months of a national election, sent a commission led by the Nigerian President to consult with Niamey, and placed Niger on its upcoming meeting agenda, beside the coups in Guinea-Bissau, Guinea, and Mauritania.

A 22 June announcement by the ECOWAS summit that member states would impose sanctions on Niger should the President attempt to revise the constitution before the next presidential election. Mahamane Toure, ECOWAS commissioner for political affairs, peace and security, was quoted by AFP saying that Tandja "has tried to keep himself in power by non-democratic means. For us, there is no legal alternative left for him."

== Legal block ==
On 12 June 2009, the Constitutional Court ruled against Tandja's referendum proposal, following a non-binding advisement to the President the month before. This time the ruling was in response to a case brought by a coalition of opposition groups, which included the CDS, a governing partner in the previous government, without which the MNSD could not gain a majority in the Assembly. In such cases, the Constitution specifies that rulings of the Constitutional Court are binding and may not be appealed. Thereafter, the Independent National Electoral Commission announced that National Assembly elections would take place on 20 August, and no referendum would be voted upon.

On 19 June President Tandja called Council of the Republic, a consultative body of all major government leaders. This was the first time this body was called. On 21 June President Tandja released a statement saying he would honor the Court and Electoral Commission rulings, and would suspend any effort to change the constitution until after the National Assembly elections on 20 August.

Despite the 21 June statement by the President, on the evening of 24 June, Minister of Communications Ben Omar released a statement by the President, demanding the Constitutional Court to rescind its decision, citing a 2002 statement by the same body that the President was able to call referendums. In apparent response, the Democratic and Social Convention (CDS) of former President Mahamane Ousmane announced its final break with the MNSD government, withdrawing from the government coalition and pulling its eight members from the Nigerien Council of Ministers. In a statement, the CDS demanded the President definitively submit to the Court's decision. The party also announced the creation of its own opposition coalition, the MDD (Mouvement pour le défense de le démocratie) along with around five smaller parties such as the UDR and the PDP. This group appears in direct competition with the larger opposition front, the FDD (Front de défense de la démocratie), which is led by the PNDS and staged the two recent anti-referendum marches in Niamey.

On the same day, the Democratic Confederation of Workers of Niger (CDTN) trade union confederation led a 24-hour general strike across the nation to protest the President's referendum plans, after a previous strike had been indefinitely postponed on 18 June. All seven trade union confederations took part, in the first general strike since the creation of the Fifth Republic in 1999. The organizers provided skeleton staffs of union workers for hospitals, water and electric utilities, and airports.

== Presidential emergency powers ==
In a televised and radio speech to the nation on the following evening (26 June, after Friday prayers), President Tandja announced he was dissolving the government and would rule by decree. On 27 June, the leader of the main opposition party, Mahamadou Issoufou, denounced what he called a coup, and called on Nigeriens to resist by all legal means, citing Article 13 of the 1999 Constitution which mandates officials to ignore "manifestly illegal orders". The military, which had previously declared itself neutral, began patrolling the streets of the capital after 18:00 hours beginning on 23 June, prior to the President's declaration of emergency powers.

The Chairman of the 66 member decentralized organization which operates and certifies all elections, the National Independent Election Commission (CENI), Moumouni Hamidou, stated following the 18 June Court decision that they would not hold the 4 August referendum and were preparing almost 7 million voting cards for the 20 August legislative election.

Despite this, Minister of the Interior Albade Abouba announced on 28 June, following President Tandja's assumption of emergency powers, that both the 4 August referendum and the 20 August election would go ahead.

On 29 June, Tandja again appeared on state media defending the state of emergency. Six of the seven CDS-Rahama members of the Council of Ministers officially stepped down, following their party's 25 June 2009 break with the President. Those leaving held relatively minor posts. CDS Minister of Defense Djida Hamadou chose to remain in government.

Later the same day the government announced it had dissolved the Constitutional Court, "nullifing" the naming of its members and "suspending" articles 103, 104, and 105 of the Constitution which deal with the court. Shortly thereafter the High Council for Communication announced that opposition broadcaster Dounia Radio Television was suspended for "the broadcast of calls for insurrection against security forces", presumably for airing Mahamadou Issoufou's statements the day prior.

On 3 July 2009, Tandja appointed a new constitutional court – a decision which was strongly criticised by civil society groups, unions, political parties and others. Lawyers declared a strike on 13 July 2009.

== 4 August 2009 referendum ==
The contested referendum was held on 4 August despite major criticism from international groups, and was overwhelmingly approved in part because of opposition boycotts. A regional director at the International Foundation for Electoral Systems said that this might put a halt in democratic development in the country and possibly force the opposition to encourage protests.

== Post referendum ==
=== Crisis talks ===
The political crisis in Niger appeared deadlocked since the disputed referendum and election. General Abdulsalami Abubakar of Nigeria, a mediator appointed by the Economic Community of West African States (ECOWAS), had been negotiating a power-sharing arrangement.

=== Coup d'état ===
On 18 February 2010 President Mamadou Tandja was captured by soldiers while chairing a cabinet meeting. The Junta established a cabinet and promised to run the government during a short transition period before new elections.

== See also ==
- Mamadou Tandja
- Constitution of Niger
- Government of Niger
- 2021 Nigerien general election protests
