= Mass media in Niger =

Mass media in Niger is a diverse collection of public and private entities, both print and broadcast, centered in the capital of Niamey, but with regional centers. The media has historically been state funded, and focused on radio broadcast media, as the nation's population is spread over great distances. Niamey has many newspapers and magazines, many of which are fiercely critical of the government. These papers though have very small circulations, and almost none outside the cities.

The majority of Niger's population live in rural communities, are relatively poor and are illiterate. Consequently, radio, in contrast to print or more expensive television is the primary source of information and entertainment amongst most Nigeriens. More than a dozen public and private radio networks broadcast across the more populated south of the nation. Many are highly critical of the government. Despite this, there is a strong government regulatory regime, and this combined with strong libel laws, have seen many journalists arrested and private media shut down during the 2000s.

== History ==
While the first newspapers were founded in the 1950s, until the end of military rule in the early 1990s, print and broadcast media were limited to government controlled outlets. With the coming of democracy in the 1991-1993 period, many print news sources were founded, mostly in the capital of Niamey and most weekly publications. From 1994, private radio stations began to appear. As illiteracy rates are high and distances around the nation are great, radio has become the primary medium for entertainment and information. State, private, and international satellite television has also begun to appear in the 2000s. Free media was suspended following the 1996 and 1999 coups, with the short Fourth Republic of 1997-1999 imposing severe restrictions on media. Since the re-installation of democracy in 1999, Nigerien media has been judged independent of central government control by international observers, although since the advent of the Tuareg rebellion of 2007-2009 Niger has seen harsh local and national restrictions on journalists.

== Print ==
The government publishes a French-language daily newspaper, Le Sahel, and its weekend edition. There are approximately 12 private French-language weekly or monthly newspapers, some of which are affiliated loosely with political parties, and most of which appeared with the formation of the Third Republic in the early 1990s. Most prominent are the daily La Nouvelle Tribune du Peuple, the weeklies Le Républicain, La Canard Dechaine, Infos de l'Air, the fortnightly l'Evenement, L'Observateur and Haské.

== Radio ==
Radio is the most important medium, as television sets are beyond the buying power of many of the rural poor, and illiteracy prevents print media from becoming a mass medium. In addition to the national and regional radio services of the state broadcaster ORTN, there are several privately owned radio networks which total more than 100 stations. Anfani FM, Radio Sarounia, Radio et Musique, Radio Bouclier, Radio Malibero, Radio Tambara, and Radio Tenere are urban-based commercial format FM networks in the major towns. These private radio stations generally are less critical of government actions than are the private newspapers. These stations broadcast programs in French as well as local or regional languages, including Djerma and Hausa. Radio Anfani and Radio et Musique presented news coverage that has included a variety of points of view. Radio Sarounia has presented regular news coverage. Its news director, Moussa Kaka, was arrested by the government in 2007 for interviewing Tuareg rebel leaders and held awaiting trial for more than a year. The other private domestic radio stations are smaller and offer little domestic news programming.

There is also a network of over 80 community radio stations spread across all seven regions of the country, governed by the Comité de Pilotage de Radios de Proximité (CPRP), a civil society organisation. The independent sector radio networks are collectively estimated by CPRP officials to cover some 7.6 million people, or about 73% of the population (2005).

Aside from Nigerien radio stations, the BBC Hausa service is listened to on FM repeaters across wide parts of the country, particularly in the south, close to the border with Nigeria. Radio France Internationale also rebroadcasts in French through some of the commercial stations, via satellite.

Tenere also runs a national independent television station of the same name.

== Television ==
- Dounia TV
- Tenere TV
- Télé Sahel

== Regulation ==
Regulation of Media in Niger is carried out by the High Council for Communication, a body appointed by the government and overseen by the Ministry of Communication. The CSC issues all licenses and press credentials, and forms the Council of the Press, a journalism accrediting body. The CSC is the only body legally allowed to close media outlets, establish bans on reporting, and license television, radio, and newspaper reporting. It also oversees and disburses government funding for private media, through its "press assistance fund". It distributes press passes and accredits journalists. Its functioning under the Third Republic was questioned, due to a perceived lack of resources. Journalists observing the CSC contrasted the vast, if vague scope of the CSC's powers with its lack of personnel and funding, rendering it "unable to exercise its numerous powers", and charging that this served the interest of political control of the media.

Under the Fifth Republic it further is responsible for creating a professional committee of journalism in Niger, which in turn creates the "Charter of Professional Journalists of Niger" (Charte des Journalistes professionnels du Niger). This is the code which the CSC then uses to oversee and sanction the professional behaviour of journalists.

== Freedom of the press ==
Despite instances of arrest and detention of journalists, West African observers generally judge Nigerien press to be independent and lively in attacking the government. Nigerien journalists say they are often pressured by local authorities. The north, under a state of emergency, has become a no-go zone for foreign press, and the independent Radio Agadez in the north has been closed by the government.

Since mid-2007, there have been a number of arrests of foreign and local journalists. Two local journalists were imprisoned in 2007 under charge of aiding the Tuareg insurgency in the north, and several radio stations have been closed. The journalist Moussa Kaka was held over a year on charges stemming from a radio interview of Rebel leaders, before being provisionally released. Foreign journalist circulated and reported freely prior to mid-2007, but since have been restricted from reporting on or traveling to the north of the country (Agadez Region). Since this time radio re-broadcasts of foreign news services have been restricted, having previously been a staple of Nigerien news coverage.

Legally, there are two instruments used regulate press behavior. Libel laws may be used against writers and publishers of material, either by the injured party or the government. The CSC is the only government agency with the legal power to close radio stations, and it may do so only after receiving a complaint. Despite this, as recently as 2005 the government have closed radio outlets without recourse to the CSC. In this case, a private radio station publicised protests to tax increases, and although initial police closures were overturned, the CSC ordered the station to refrain from broadcasting political news, sports coverage, or commercials. Since the beginning of the 2007 Tuareg insurgency in the north, the CSC has closed a number of outlets, and pronounced blanket bans on coverage of certain topics in the media, and of reporting from the northern part of the nation. Specific stations have been suspended for the content of their coverage, the topics discussed in on air debates, or simply for reporting on the conflict in the north. Amnesty International has complained that these measures are in violation of Niger's commitments to International Law. In 2009, Reporters Without Borders and the International Federation of Journalists accused the government on Niger of carrying out harassment of Nigerien journalists, following three high-profile arrests and libel cases brought against newspapers by members of the government and the arrest of two officials of Dounia TV for comments made by others on their station. Dounia, the only non-governmental Nigerien Television News station, has been accused of giving air time to supporters Hama Amadou, an imprisoned ruling party rival of the President of Niger. RSF claimed that "The Dounia group is the victim of repeated harassment by the judicial authorities".

== Religious broadcasting ==
The Islamic Association of Niger, which acts as an official advisory committee to the government on religious matters, broadcasts biweekly on the government controlled television station. On government-controlled media, Christian programs generally are broadcast only on special occasions, such as Christmas and Easter, although the independent media regularly broadcast such programs. Regulations from 2007 of the High Council for Communication, the body which licenses all broadcasts, includes a ban on all "purely political or confessional broadcasters".

== State media ==
The government-owned Radio Voix du Sahel radio transmits 14 hours per day, providing news and other programs in French and several local languages. Tele-Sahel, ORTN's television station transmits to all urban centers.

The state ORTN network depends financially on the government, partly through an addition to electricity bills and partly through direct subsidy. The High Council for Communication also maintains a fund which supports private broadcasters, although its payments are criticised as political and irregular.

== See also ==
- Internet in Niger
- Internet censorship and surveillance in Niger
- Telecommunications in Niger
- Cinema of Niger

== Bibliography ==
- Abdourahmane Idrissa; Samuel Decalo (2012). "Media". Historical Dictionary of Niger (4th ed.). Scarecrow Press. pp. 320+. ISBN 978-0-8108-7090-1.
- "Niger", Freedom of the Press, USA: Freedom House, 2016, OCLC 57509361, archived from the original on 2017-06-29
