= Anfani FM =

Nigerien radio network

Niamey; Niger
- Broadcast area: Niger
- Frequency: 100.0

Programming
- Language: French, Hausa, Zarma, other local languages

Ownership
- Owner: Agence Anfani (founded by Grémah Boucar)

Anfani FM is a privately operated radio network in Niger. Based in the capital of Niamey, Anfani also has stations in the regional centers of Maradi, Zinder, Birni Nkonni, and Diffa.

== History and content ==
Founded by newspaper journalist Grémah Boucar as an offshoot of his Anfani print news weekly, Radio Anfani (FM 100 MHz) in Niamey was one of Niger's first non-governmental broadcasters. Anfani was shut several times in the 1990s by the government of Col. Ibrahim Baré Maïnassara. Since the return of civilian rule in 1999, Anfani FM journalists have faced arrest and government sanctions related to their reporting on a number of occasions.

Anfani provided access to the airways for opposition politicians during the military regime, and continues to broadcast domestic news in French, Hausa, Djerma, and other regional languages. The station also rebroadcasts the Voice of America and Deutsche Welle news. While private, Anfani has previously received grants from the United States government, through the National Endowment for Democracy.

== Stations ==
Anfani broadcasts with transmitters of 1.5 kW based in Niamey, Maradi, Birni Nkonni, Zinder and Diffa, all on FM 100MHZ.

== Notable Incidents ==
In November 2003, three journalists from Anfani FM in Zinder were arrested following the broadcast of a report about violent clashes between farmers and cattle herders. The journalists, Amadou Mamoudou, Harouna Mato, and station director Ismaël Moutari, were detained by local authorities who accused the station of spreading sensitive information. While Mamoudou and Mato were released after a short detention, Moutari was held longer and pressured to reveal his sources. The arrests drew widespread criticism from media freedom advocates and highlighted the challenges faced by independent broadcasters in Niger. The incident became a notable example of the pressures faced by private radio stations in the country, where covering sensitive issues could result in direct confrontation with political and security authorities.

== See also ==
- Media of Niger
