= Office of Radio and Television of Niger =

State broadcasting company of Niger

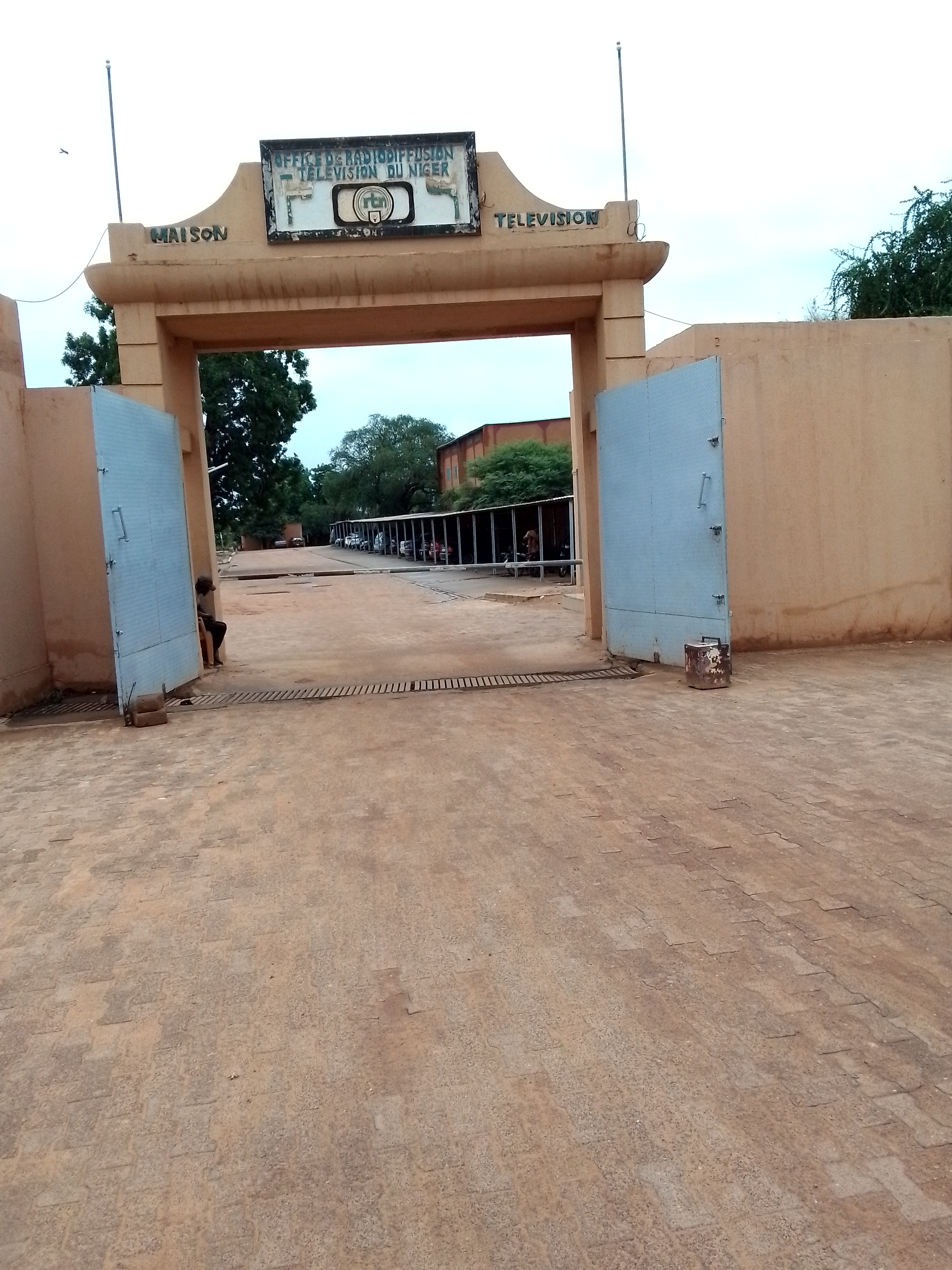
ORTN headquarters in Niamey

The Radio Television of Niger (RTN), formerly known as Office of Radio and Television of Niger (French: Office de radiodiffusion et Télévision du Niger), or ORTN for short, is the state broadcaster of the West African nation of Niger. RTN operates the Télé Sahel terrestrial television station, Radio Voix du Sahel radio network, and the Tal TV satellite station (2001). RTN is overseen and funded by the Ministry of Culture, Arts & Communication.

== History ==
On 11 February 1967, Radio & TV operations merged in ORTN.

In April 2000, the broadcasting sector was completely liberalized and as a result several private television stations were established in Niger. The ORTN reacted to this development by creating a second television program: Tal TV has been broadcasting since 2001.

The ORTN has delegated two of the seven members to the Conseil de Presse (Press Council) since it was founded in March 2007. This self-regulatory institution of the Nigerien media has set itself the task of monitoring media ethical standards and is responsible for issuing press cards.

In April 2022, it became Radio Télévision du Niger to split the editorial activities from infrastructure broadcasting operations done at the newly created Télédiffusion du Niger (TDN).

The official statement of the 2023 military coup by General Abdourahamane Tiani was declared at RTN Télé Sahel.

RTN is member of African Union of Broadcasting (AUB).
