= Le Républicain (Niger) =

French-language Nigerien newspaper

- Founder(s): Maman Abou
- Founded: 1991
- Language: French
- City: Niamey
- Country: Niger

Le Républicain is a French-language weekly newspaper in the Nigerien capital of Niamey. The newspaper is published every Thursday, and run from offices at the Place du Petit Marché, Niamey. Le Républicain was founded in 1991, with the relaxing of media laws, by Maman Abou, a computer technician and political organiser. The newspaper is independent of the government, and was often highly critical of President of Niger Tandja Mamadou. The newspaper continues to be owned and operated by Maman Abou, who also owns Niger's largest independent publishing house. An online version launched in 1999.

== See also ==
- Media of Niger
