= Dounia TV =

Nigerien broadcaster

Dounia TV (Radio Télévision Dounia) is a private press organisation based in the Nigerien capital of Niamey. It broadcasts news and entertainment programing in the Niamey area with repeaters in several provinces. One of the few private broadcasters in Niger, it is the only Nigerien produced television news source outside of the government operated Tele-Sahel. Dounia first broadcast on 26 February 2007 on 89 MHz (radio) and 527.25 MHz (television). Its director and founder is Abibou Garba.

== Government actions ==
The Government press regulation body, the High Council for Communication (CSC) closed Niamey based TV and radio stations of Dounia TV for one month in August 2008, and closed for an indefinite period Sahara FM, the main radio station in Agadez on 22 April 2008 for broadcasting interviews with people who had claimed they were the victims of abuses by government troops.

Following an on-air round-table discussion of French President Nicolas Sarkozy's visit to Niger, Dounia TV's director Habibou Garba, Editor-in-Chief Seyni Amadou, and civil society activist, Elhadj Idi Abdou were arrested by the government of Niger, charged with "broadcasting false information". The 31 March 2009 arrests came after a 30 March broadcast of "Circle of Colleagues" ("le Cercle des confrères"), a round table discussion show. During the show, Abdou stated that Sarkozy's visit was "a technical stopover" to facilitate "the looting of Niger's resources". The charges carry a punishment of one to two years imprisonment and fines of from FCFA 100,000 to FCFA 1,000,000. Dounia Media also faced a separate court case: a defamation lawsuit by MNSD-Nassara members of the National Assembly of Niger, following comments in one of its programmes by an opposition member. Earlier in 2009, the CSC warned that Dounia TV could be closed for showing film of Nigerien Police forcefully dispersing supporters of jailed former Prime Minister of Niger Hama Amadou during a Niamey protest. Dounia TV has been described as "giving considerable air-time" to supporters of Hama Amadou's faction in the ruling MNSD-Nassara. Reporters Without Borders claimed in a statement following the March 31 arrests that "The Dounia group is the victim of repeated harassment by the judicial authorities".

== Suppression ==
After President Tandja declared emergency rule on 27 June, during the 2009 Nigerien constitutional crisis, Dounia was the first media outlet closed by the government. On 29 June, the CSC announced that all Dounaia broadcasting was suspended for "the broadcast of calls for insurrection against security forces", presumably for airing opposition leader Mahamadou Issoufou's statements the day prior. On 1 July, a press NGO statement claimed that six of the eleven CSC board members had signed a protest letter over both the closing, and the way in which the decision was taken. They claimed the board members were not consulted, but the sanction was simply taken by the chair without knowledge of the board.

== See also ==
- Media of Niger
- Human Rights in Niger
