= Voix du Sahel =

Radio statoon in Niger

Programming
- Languages: French, Arabic, National languages

History
- Founded: July 31, 1958

La Voix du Sahel (English: "Voice of the Sahel") is the national radio station of Niger, owned by the Nigerien government, operating on 91.3 MHz. Based in Niamey, the radio station was established and went on air on 31 July, 1958 as Radio Niger but adopted its current name in 1974. It is the only national radio station in the country and is the only radio station to offer programs in eight different languages including French.

== See also ==
- Media of Niger
