= Chief of the Defence Staff (Niger) =

Highest-ranking military officer of Niger

The Chief of Staff of the Armed Forces (French: Chef d'État-Major des Armées, abbreviated CEMA) is the highest-ranking military officer and professional head of the Niger Armed Forces. The officeholder exercises operational command over the military and reports to the Minister of National Defence and the President of Niger. The current Chief of Staff of the Armed Forces is Brigadier General Mamane Sani Kiaou, who was appointed on 11 September 2026 by presidential decree. Prior to December 2003, the Niger Armed Forces operated under a unified command structure in which the Chief of Staff oversaw both army and the air force.

== List of officeholders ==
Portrait	Name	Took office	Left office	Notes
	Colonel Demba Maïnassara	3 September 1961	1 January 1969	
	Colonel Balla-Arabé Chaweye	1 January 1969	5 July 1973	
	Lieutenant Colonel Seyni Kountché	5 July 1973	15 April 1974	
	Colonel Ali Saibou	November 1974	10 November 1987	
	Colonel Ibrahim Baré Maïnassara	March 1995	27 January 1996	
	Colonel Moussa Moumouni Djermakoye	April 1997	1999	
	Army Corps General Moumouni Boureima	1999	February 2010	
	Army Corps General Salou Souleymane	2 March 2010	2011	
	Army Corps General Seyni Garba	2011	5 January 2018	
	Divisional General Ahmed Mohamed	5 January 2018	13 January 2020	
	Major General Salifou Modi	13 January 2020	31 March 2023	
	Divisional General Abdou Sidikou Issa	31 March 2023	5 August 2023	
	Major General Moussa Salaou Barmou	5 August 2023	11 September 2026	
	Brigadier General Mamane Sani Kiaou	11 September 2026	Present	

== See also ==
- Niger Armed Forces
- Ministry of National Defence (Niger)
- Chief of the Defence Staff (France)
