= List of equipment of the Nigerien Armed Forces =

This is a list of equipment used by the Nigerien Armed Forces.

== Army ==
=== Armoured fighting vehicles ===
Model	Image	Origin	Quantity	Details
RECCE
AML-90		France	90	
AML-60		France	35	
AML-20		France	35	
BRDM-2		Soviet Union	30	
APC (W)
WZ-551		China	20	
Bastion		France	11	
Panhard M3		France	22	
PPV
IAG Guardian Xtreme		United Arab Emirates	15	
Mamba Mk7		South Africa	57	
Puma M36		South Africa	5+	
Puma M26		South Africa	21	
AUV
Tiger 4×4		China	3+	
VBL		France	7	
Bastion Patsas		France	n/a	
