= National Police of Niger =

National civilian police force of Niger

National Police of Niger Yan sandan kasar Nijar Police nationale du Niger
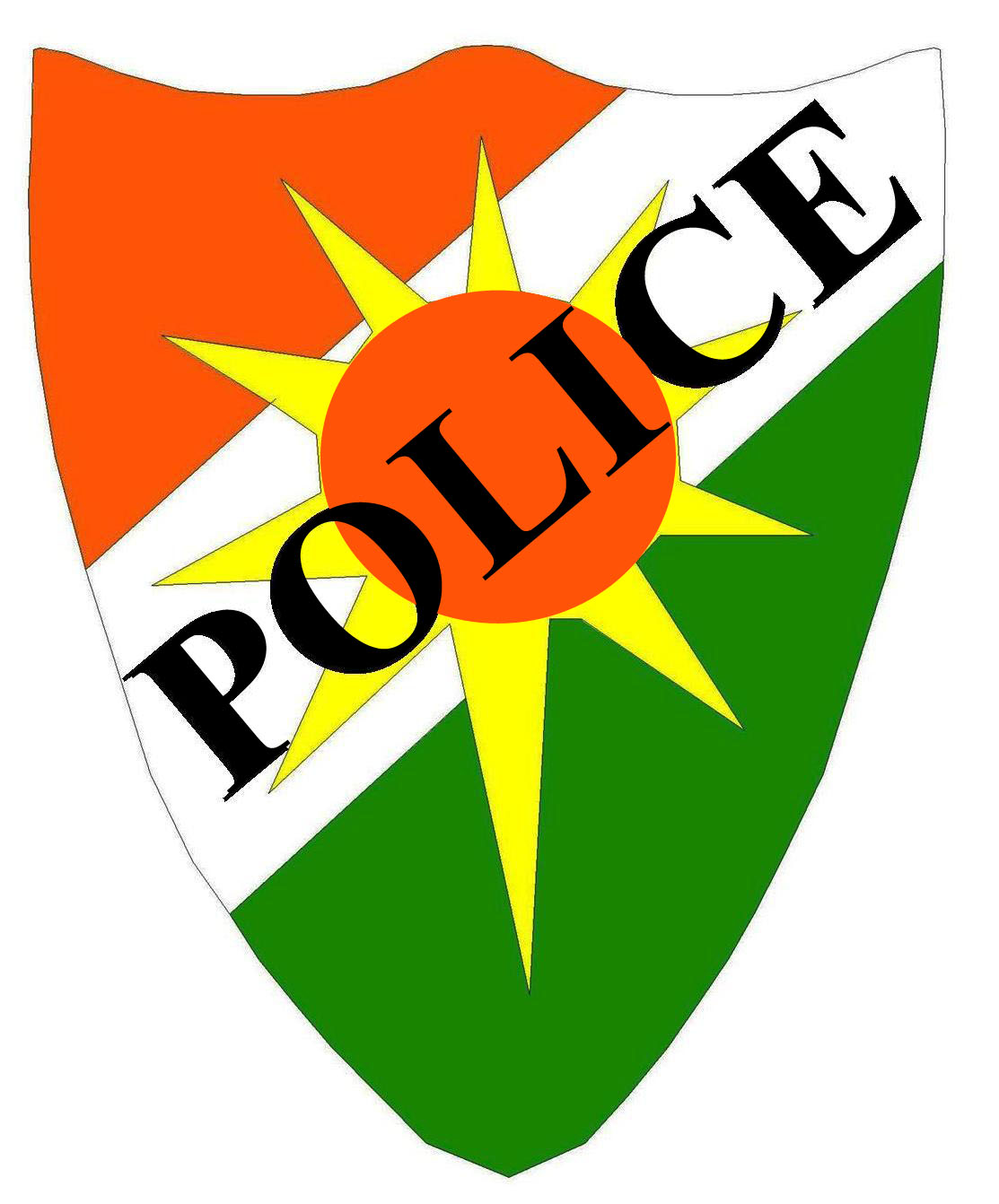
- Seal of the National Police

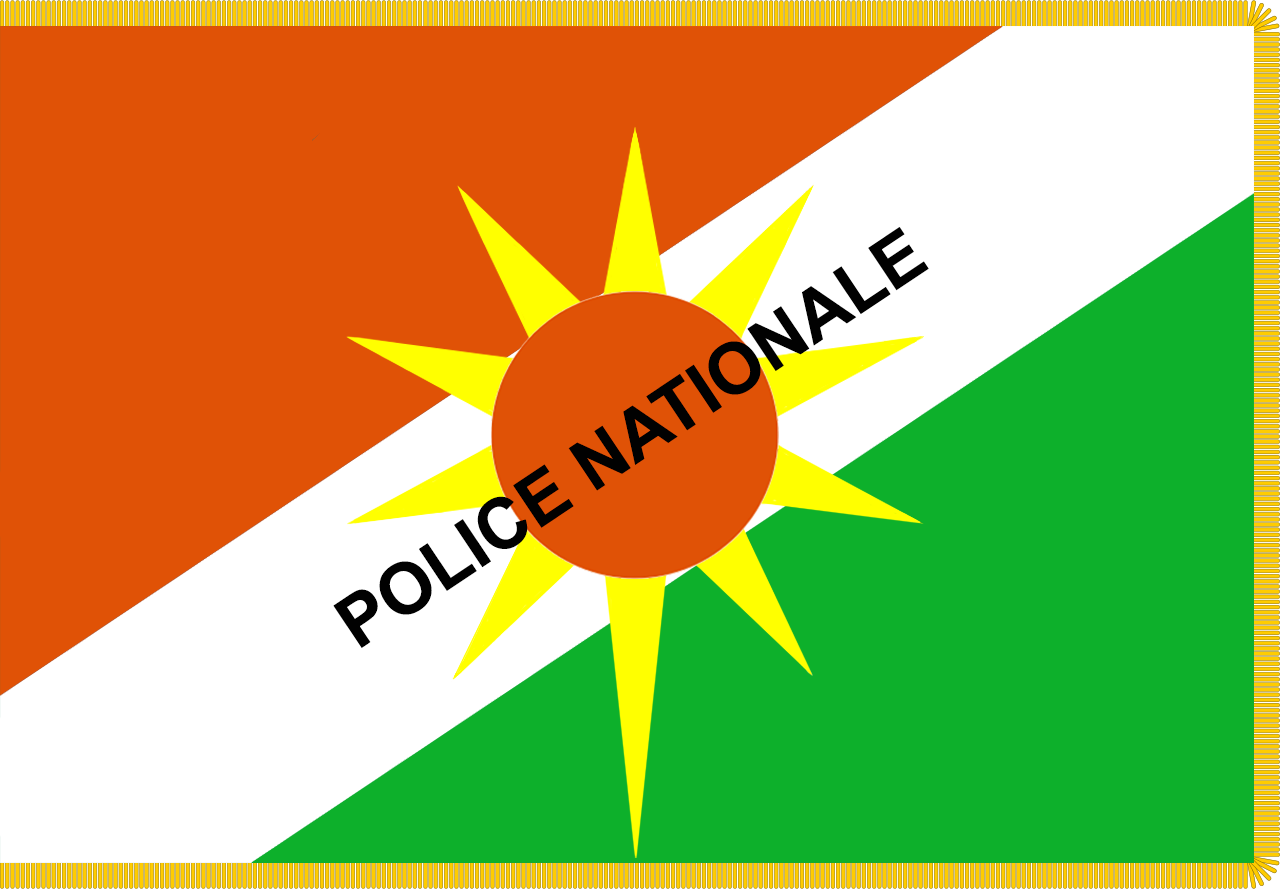
- Flag of the National Police
- Abbreviation: PNN
- Motto: Écouter, Protéger, Servir; Listen, Protect, Serve

Agency overview
- Formed: 1999
- Employees: 5000 (2014)

Jurisdictional structure
- National agency (Operations jurisdiction): Niger
- Operations jurisdiction: Niger
- Legal jurisdiction: Urban areas
- Governing body: Government of Niger
- General nature: Local civilian police

Operational structure
- Overseen by: Direction générale de la police nationale
- Headquarters: Niamey, Niger
- Minister responsible: General Mohamed TOUMBA, Ministry of the Interior
- Agency executive: Assahaba Ebankawel, Director-General
- Parent agency: Ministry of Interior, Public Safety and Decentralization
- Directorates: 11: Direction Ecole Nationale de la Police; Direction Ressources Financières; Direction Ressources Humaines; Direction Logistique/Infrastructures; Direction Sécurité Publique; Direction Police Judiciaire; Direction Renseignement Intérieur; Direction Protection Hautes Personnalités; Direction Etudes/Rég. Coopération Technique

Website
- Official website (in French)

The National Police (Hausa: Yan sandan kasar Nijar; French: Police Nationale) is the national civilian police force of Niger. The National Police are under the Ministry of Interior, Public Safety and Decentralization and report to the General Directorate of National Police. They are responsible for law enforcement in urban areas, the protection of government buildings and institutions, and the security of government leaders. Niger's gendarmerie, the Gendarmerie Nationale, is a separate agency under the Niger Armed Forces, and are responsible for policing in rural areas.

The National Police numbered approximately 5,000 in 2014. The Niger police emergency number is 17.

The National Police sponsor a semi-professional football club, AS Police, which plays in the Super Ligue.

== Organization ==
The General Directorate of the National Police (Direction Générale de la Police nationale - DGPN) is the highest structure of the National Police of Niger and is headed by Director-General (Directeur Général de la Police Nationale) Souley Boubacar. The General Directorate of the National Police is subdivided in 9 directorates. The directorates are:

- Directorate of the National School of the Police -- (Direction Ecole Nationale de la Police)
- Directorate of Financial Resources -- (Direction Ressources Financières)
- Directorate of Human Resources -- (Direction Ressources Humaines)
- Directorate of Logistics and Infrastructures -- (Direction Logistique et Infrastructures)
- Directorate of Public Security -- (Direction Sécurité Publique)
- Directorate of Judiciary Police -- (Direction Police Judiciaire)
  - Division of Criminal Investigations -- (Division des Investigations Criminelles)
  - Division of Financial and Economic Investigations -- (Division Des Enquêtes Financières et Economiques)
  - Division of Vice and the Protection of Minors -- (Division des Mœurs et Protection des Mineurs)
  - Division of Cybercriminality, Statistics and Analysis -- (Division lutte contre la cybercriminalité Statistique and Analyse)
  - National Central Bureau - Interpol -- (Bureau Central National - Interpol)
  - Anti-Drug Center -- (Centre Anti‐Drogue)
  - Judiciary Identity Central Service -- (Service Central Identité Judiciaire)
  - Inter-regional Judiciary Service -- (Service Inter‐Régional de la Police Judiciaire)
- Directorate of Homeland Intelligence -- (Direction Renseignement Intérieur)
- Directorate of Protection of High Personality -- (Direction Protection Hautes Personnalités)
- Directorate of Studies and Technical Cooperation -- (Direction Etudes/Rég. Coopération Technique)

== Criticism ==
Foreign governments have accused the National Police of being poorly trained, equipped, and corrupt. The United States Department of State has alleged that Nigerien police officers commonly ask victims of crimes to pay them for assistance when called, that police may not actually respond to calls for service, and that police take a very long time to respond. The National Police's vehicles have also been criticized for lacking basic necessities such as fuel.

== See also ==
- Law enforcement in Niger
