= Dayak =

Dayak may refer to:

- Dayak people, an ethnic group native to the interior of Borneo island in Indonesia and Malaysia
- Dayak language
- Land Dayak languages
- A creature in the science fiction film Immortal (2004 film)
- Troy Dayak (born 1971), American soccer player
- Mano Dayak (1949-1995), Tuareg freedom fighter, leader, and negotiator

== See also ==
- Dyak (disambiguation)
