= Marie Lebihan =

Nigerien politician

Member of the National Assembly
- In office 1989–1991
- Constituency: Maradi

Marie Lebihan was a Nigerien politician. She was one of the first group of women elected to the National Assembly in 1989.

== Biography ==
A member of the National Movement for the Development of Society (MNSD), Lebihan was nominated as a candidate for the National Assembly in Maradi in the 1989 elections. With the MNSD being the sole legal party, she was elected unopposed, becoming one of the first group of five women elected to the National Assembly. The National Assembly was dissolved in 1991 and she was not re-elected in the 1993 elections.
