= 1989 Nigerien general election =

- 10 December 1989
- Turnout: 95.06% (▼3.29pp)
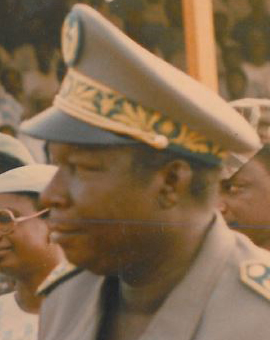
Nominee	Ali Saibou
Party	MNSD
Popular vote	3,316,182
Percentage	99.60%
President before election
Ali Saibou
MNSD
Elected President
Ali Saibou
MNSD

General elections were held in Niger on 10 December 1989 to elect a President and National Assembly. They were the first elections since 1970, and followed the approval of a new constitution in a referendum in September, which had made the country a one-party state with the National Movement for the Society of Development as the sole legal party. As a result, its leader, the incumbent president Ali Saibou, was elected unopposed, and the party won all 93 seats in the Assembly. Voter turnout was 95%.

== Results ==
For the first time, women won seats in the National Assembly, with Roukayatou Abdou Issaka, Bibata Adamou Dakaou, Souna Hadizatou Diallo, Aïssata Karidjo Mounkaïla and Marie Lebihan becoming the country's first female members of parliament.

Party	Presidential candidate	Votes	%	Seats
National Movement for the Society of Development	Ali Saibou	3,316,182	99.60	93
Against		13,472	0.40	–
Total		3,329,654	100.00	93
Valid votes		3,329,654	99.84	
Invalid/blank votes		5,259	0.16	
Total votes		3,334,913	100.00	
Registered voters/turnout		3,508,204	95.06	
Source: Nohlen et al.
