= List of equipment of the Guinean Army =

This is a list of equipment of the Guinean Army in service.

Many of Guineas's weapons are of Warsaw Pact origin.

== Small arms ==
Name	Image	Caliber	Type	Origin	Notes
Pistols
TT-33		7.62×25mm Tokarev	Semi-automatic pistol	Soviet Union	
Submachine guns
Sa 23		9×19mm	Submachine gun	Czechoslovak Socialist Republic	
MAT-49		9×19mm	Submachine gun	France	
Sterling		9×19mm	Submachine gun	United Kingdom	
Rifles
SKS		7.62×39mm	Semi-automatic rifle	Soviet Union	
AKM		7.62×39mm	Assault rifle	Soviet Union	
Vz. 58		7.62×39mm	Assault rifle	Czechoslovak Socialist Republic	
Type 81		7.62×39mm	Assault rifle	China	
Heckler & Koch G3		7.62×51mm	Battle rifle	West Germany	
MAS-36		7.5×54mm	Bolt-action rifle	France	
Machine guns
RPD		7.62×39mm	Squad automatic weapon	Soviet Union	
PKM		7.62×54mmR	General-purpose machine gun	Soviet Union	
KPV		14.5×114mm	Heavy machine gun	Soviet Union	
DShK		12.7×108mm	Heavy machine gun	Soviet Union	
Rocket propelled grenade launchers
RPG-2		40mm	Rocket-propelled grenade	Soviet Union	
RPG-7		40mm	Rocket-propelled grenade	Soviet Union	

== Anti-tank weapons ==
Name	Image	Type	Origin	Caliber	Quantity	Notes
9M14 Malyutka		Anti-tank weapon	Soviet Union			

== Vehicles ==
Tanks
Name	Image	Type	Origin	Quantity	Status	Notes
PT-76		Amphibious Light tank	Soviet Union	15		
T-34-85		Medium tank	Soviet Union	30		
T-54		Medium tank	Soviet Union	8		
Armoured fighting vehicles
BRDM-1		Amphibious armored scout car	Soviet Union	25		
BRDM-2		Amphibious armored scout car	Soviet Union	25		
BMP-1		Infantry fighting vehicle	Soviet Union	2		
Armoured fighting vehicles
BTR-152		Armored personnel carrier	Soviet Union	6		
BTR-40		Armored personnel carrier	Soviet Union	16		
BTR-50		Amphibious Armored personnel carrier	Soviet Union	10		
BTR-60		Armored personnel carrier	Soviet Union	8		
Mamba		Armored personnel carrier	South Africa	10		
GAZ Tigr		Infantry mobility vehicle	Russia	100		
Reconnaissance vehicles
Panhard AML-90		Armored car	France	2		
Mine-Resistant Ambush Protected vehicles
PUMA M26-15		MRAP	South Africa	32		
PUMA M36		MRAP	South Africa	9		

== Artillery ==
Name	Image	Type	Origin	Quantity	Status	Notes
Rocket artillery
BM-27 Uragan		Multiple rocket launcher	Soviet Union	3		
Mortars
PM-38		Mortar	Soviet Union	20		
MT-13		Mortar	Soviet Union	20		
Field artillery
ZiS-2		Anti-tank gun	Soviet Union	2		
A-19		Field gun	Soviet Union	12		
D-44		Field gun	Soviet Union	6		
M-46		Field gun	Soviet Union	12		

== Air defence systems ==
Name	Image	Type	Origin	Quantity	Status	Notes
61-K		Autocannon	Soviet Union	8		
Type 59		Autocannon	Soviet Union China	12		
KS-19		Anti-aircraft gun	Soviet Union	4		
