= Ministry of Youth and Sports (Niger) =

Government ministry in Niger responsible for youth affairs and sports policy

- Ministère de la Jeunesse et du Sport
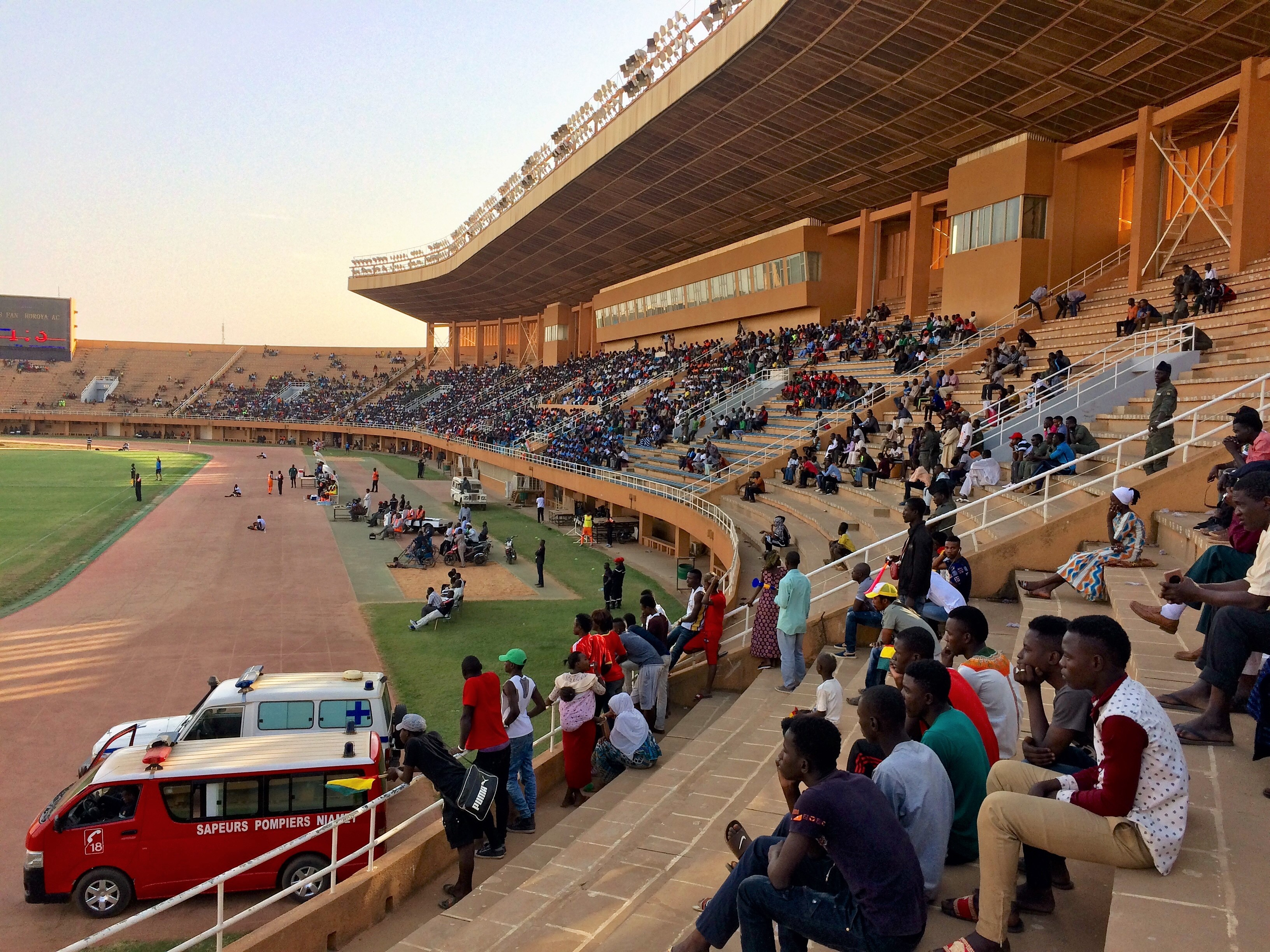

Government ministry overview
- Jurisdiction: Government of Niger
- Headquarters: Niamey, Niger
- Minister responsible: Sidi Mohamed Al Mahmoud, Minister of Youth and Sports
- Parent department: Government of Niger

The Ministry of Youth and Sports is a government ministry in Niger responsible for youth affairs and sports policy. The Ministry designs, implements, and monitors state policies relating to youth development and sports. It also works to involve young people in human capital development and in peace-building activities.

== Responsibilities ==
The Ministry of Youth and Sports has the following responsibilities:

- Formulate and execute national policy for youth and sports.
- Mobilize youth into activities that build human capital and promote peace and social cohesion.
- Oversee the development, maintenance, and supervision of youth and sports facilities and infrastructure across the country.
- Promote women’s participation in sports as part of efforts to ensure equality and inclusion.

== Headquarters ==
The Ministry’s headquarters are located in Niamey, the capital of Niger.

== Recent developments ==
In April 2025, General Sidi Mohamed Al Mahmoud was appointed as Minister of Youth and Sports, replacing Colonel Major Abdrahamane Amadou during a government reshuffle under the transitional regime. The change in leadership is part of a broader refondation policy being pursued by Niger’s government since the coup of July 2023.

Under the new minister’s tenure, there has been a focus on inspecting and reviving youth and sports infrastructure. On 9 May 2025, he visited several sports centers in Niamey, including the State Olympic pool, the Village of the Francophonie complex (under construction), a Maracanã soccer field, a women’s association center’s sporting facilities, and the traditional wrestling arena.

The minister has emphasized unity, cohesion, and greater responsibility from ministry staff, stressing the strategic importance of the Ministry in a country with a very young population, more than half of whom are under the age of 15.

== See also ==
- Government of Niger
- Sport in Niger
