= Souna Hadizatou Diallo =

Member of the National Assembly
- In office 1989–1991
- Constituency: Niamey

Personal details
- Born: Say, Niger

Souna Hadizatou Diallo is a Nigerien former politician and lawyer. She was one of the first group of women elected to the National Assembly and later became the first woman to lead a political party in the country.

== Biography ==
Diallo was born in Say. She joined the Ministry of Education in 1964 and trained at the National School of Administration. From 1988 to 1989 she worked for Sanofi.

A member of the National Movement for the Development of Society (MNSD), Diallo was nominated as a candidate for the National Assembly in Niamey in the 1989 elections. With the MNSD being the sole legal party, she was elected unopposed, becoming one of the first group of five women elected to the National Assembly. The National Assembly was dissolved in 1991 and she was not re-elected in the 1993 elections. In 2006 she established the Nigerien Party for the Reinforcement of Democracy, becoming the first woman to head a political party in the country.
