= Military ranks of Niger =

The military ranks of Niger are the military insignia used by the Niger Armed Forces. Niger is a landlocked country, and does therefore not possess a navy. Being a former colony of France, Niger shares a rank structure similar to that of France.

== Commissioned officer ranks ==
The rank insignia of commissioned officers.

Rank group	General / flag officers				Senior officers			Junior officers
Niger Army
Niger Army	Général d'armée	Général de corps d'armée	Général de division	Général de brigade	Colonel	Lieutenant-colonel	Commandant	Capitaine	Lieutenant	Sous-lieutenant
Niger Air Force
Niger Air Force					Colonel	Lieutenant-colonel	Commandant	Capitaine	Lieutenant	Sous-lieutenant
National Gendarmerie of Niger
National Gendarmerie of Niger	Général d'armée	Général de corps d'armée	Général de division	Général de brigade	Colonel	Lieutenant-colonel	Commandant	Capitaine	Lieutenant	Sous-lieutenant
Rank group	General / flag officers				Senior officers			Junior officers

== Other ranks ==
The rank insignia of non-commissioned officers and enlisted personnel.

Rank group	Senior NCOs					Junior NCOs		Enlisted
Niger Army
Niger Army	Major	Adjudant-chef	Adjudant	Sergent-chef	Sergent	Caporal-chef	Caporal	Soldat de 1^{re} classe	Soldat de 2^{e} classe
Niger Air Force
Niger Air Force	Adjudant-chef		Adjudant	Sergent-chef	Sergent	Caporal-chef	Caporal	Soldat de première classe	Soldat
National Gendarmerie of Niger
National Gendarmerie of Niger	Major	Adjudant-chef	Adjudant	Maréchal des logis chef	Maréchal des logis	Gendarme de 1^{re} classe	Gendarme de 2^{e} classe	Gendarme de 3^{e} classe	Gendarme de 4^{e} classe	Gendarme auxiliaire
Rank group	Senior NCOs					Junior NCOs		Enlisted
