= Bibata Adamou Dakaou =

Member of the National Assembly
- In office 1989–1991
- Constituency: Kollo

Personal details
- Born: 1941 (age 83–84)

Bibata Adamou Dakaou (born 1941) is a Nigerien former educator and politician. She was one of the first group of women elected to the National Assembly in 1989.

== Biography ==
Born in 1941, Dakaou was educated in Fada N'Gourma and Ouagadougou in Upper Volta before studying pedagogy and teaching in Niamey and Paris. She worked as a teacher and primary school inspector from 1960 to 1986. Having become one of the leaders of the Association of Women of Niger, in 1986 she was appointed National Director for Women's Empowerment.

A member of the National Movement for the Development of Society (MNSD), Dakaou was nominated as a candidate for the National Assembly in Kollo in the 1989 elections. With the MNSD being the sole legal party, she was elected unopposed, becoming one of the first group of five women elected to the National Assembly. When the National Assembly was dissolved in 1991, she was appointed to the transitional High Council of the Republic. After multi-party politics was introduced she joined the Democratic and Social Convention, but was not re-elected in the 1993 elections. She subsequently returned to the civil service, becoming Technical Director for Population and Family Life, before retiring in 1996.
