= Mohamed Akotey =

Nigerien politician and former rebel leader

- Born: ~1967; Tidene, Niger
- Education: University of Niamey; Sorbonne University
- Occupations: Leader of Temoust Liberation Front (1995); Minister of Environment of Niger (2007); Chairman of board of directors of Imouraren SA (2008-?)
- Relatives: Mano Dayak (uncle)

Mohamed Akotey is a Nigerien politician of Ifoghas Tuareg heritage and former rebel leader.

== Biography ==
Akotey was born around 1967 in the village of Tidene, just north of Agadez. He studied geography in Niamey, and later left to study archaeology at Sorbonne University.

On December 15, 1995, his uncle Mano Dayak, the head of Temoust Liberation Front, died in a plane accident during the Tuareg rebellion. Akotey was urged by his family to lead the Coordination of Armed Resistance, a coalition of anti-government Tuareg groups led by Dayak that included the TLF. Unlike Dayak, however, Akotey joined government negotiations and made amends with Rhissa Ag Boula, another Tuareg leader who had a rivalry with Dayak.

Akotey was appointed Nigerien Minister of the Environment and Fight Against Desertification in 2007 by Mamadou Tandja.

In 2008, Akotey resigned from his post to become chairman of the board of directors of Imouraren SA, which controlled the Imouraren mine. In 2010, Salou Djibo entrusted Akotey with securing the release of the Arlit hostages kidnapped on September 16, 2010. This role continued under the Issoufou administration. Akotey helped release the hostages on October 27, 2013, after mediating with jihadist leader Ibrahim Ag Inawalen. After the release of the Arlit hostages, Akotey negotiated the release of Serge Lazarevic, who was kidnapped in Mali in 2012.
