= 1989 Nigerien constitutional referendum =

Constitutional referendum held in Niger

24 September 1989

Results
Choice	Votes	%
Yes	3,275,737	99.28%
No	23,713	0.72%
Valid votes	3,299,450	99.78%
Invalid or blank votes	7,425	0.22%
Total votes	3,306,875	100.00%
Registered voters/turnout	3,477,874	95.08%

A constitutional referendum was held in Niger on 24 September 1989. The new constitution would make the country a one-party state with the National Movement for the Society of Development as the sole legal party. The government would have a presidential system, as well as the continued involvement of the Armed Forces, which had ruled the country since the military coup in 1974.

It was approved by 99.3% of voters with a 94.9% turnout. The first elections under the new constitution were held later in the year on 12 December.

== Results ==
Choice	Votes	%
For	3,275,737	99.28
Against	23,713	0.72
Total	3,299,450	100.00
Valid votes	3,299,450	99.78
Invalid/blank votes	7,425	0.22
Total votes	3,306,875	100.00
Registered voters/turnout	3,477,874	95.08
Source: Nohlen et al.
