= Aïssata Karidjo Mounkaïla =

Member of the National Assembly
- In office 1989–1991; 1993–1996; 1999–2009
- Constituency: Niamey

Personal details
- Born: 1942

Aïssata Karidjo Mounkaïla (born 1942) is a Nigerien former politician. She was one of the first group of women elected to the National Assembly in 1989 and remained a member until 1996. She served in the National Assembly again from 1999 to 2009.

== Biography ==
Mounkaïla was born in 1942, the daughter of a civil servant. She attended the École Nationale d’Administration in Niamey, training to be a secretary. She entered the civil service in 1967. In 1977 she joined the Association of Nigerien Women and became its deputy secretary-general. She soon became secretary-general, a role she held for many years.

A member of the National Movement for the Development of Society (MNSD), Mounkaïla was nominated as a candidate for the National Assembly in Niamey in the 1989 elections. With the MNSD being the sole legal party, she was elected unopposed, becoming one of the first group of five women elected to the National Assembly. The National Assembly was subsequently dissolved in 1991. She was re-elected in multi-party elections in 1993 and 1995, but lost her seat in the 1996 elections, which the MNSD boycotted. She returned to the National Assembly following the 1999 elections, when she was the only woman elected. She was re-elected in 2004, serving until 2009.
