= 1992 Nigerien constitutional referendum =

- 26 December 1992

Results
Choice	Votes	%
Yes	1,945,653	89.79%
No	221,267	10.21%
Valid votes	2,166,920	98.17%
Invalid or blank votes	40,300	1.83%
Total votes	2,207,220	100.00%
Registered voters/turnout	3,900,881	56.58%

A constitutional referendum was held in Niger on 26 December 1992. The new constitution would restore multi-party democracy for the first time since 1960, whilst also allowing unlimited number of five-year terms for the President. It was approved by 89.79% of voters, with a turnout of 56.6%. Upon its promulgation on 22 January 1993, the Third Republic came into being, which lasted until the 1996 coup.

== Background ==
The constitution of December 1992 was created over more than a year, following the formation of the civilian National Conference to supersede semi-Military rule.

The National Conference organised a referendum on 26 December 1992, where voters were given the option to vote for or against a Constitution creating a dual executive system with strong guarantees of Human rights, and no political role for the military, the Third Republic.

== Results ==
Choice	Votes	%
For	1,945,653	89.79
Against	221,267	10.21
Invalid/blank votes	40,300	–
Total	2,207,220	100
Registered voters/turnout	3,900,881	56.58
Source: Direct Democracy

== Aftermath ==
The National Council enacted the Constitution on 22 January 1993, and elections for the National Assembly were held on 14 February 1993. The first round of the presidential elections were held on 27 February and the second round held on 27 March 1993. Mahamane Ousmane was elected as the country's fourth President.
