= Ministry of National Defence (Niger) =

Defence ministry of Niger

The Ministry of National Defence of Niger (French: Ministère de la Défense nationale) is a government ministry in Niger with the statutory responsibility of overseeing and supervising the Niger Armed Forces and the National Gendarmerie. The Ministry of Defence is headed by the Minister of Defence, who reports directly to the President of Niger.

== List of ministers ==
| Name | Term start | Term end | Head of State |
|---|---|---|---|
| Zodi Ikhia | 1960 | 1963 | Hamani Diori |
| Yacouba Djibo | 1963 | 1963 | Hamani Diori |
| Noma Kaka | 1963 | 1972 | Hamani Diori |
| Léopold Kaziendé | 1972 | 15 April 1974 | Hamani Diori |
| Idrissa Harouna | 15 April 1974 | 1974 | Seyni Kountché |
| Seyni Kountché | 1974 | 10 November 1987 | Seyni Kountché |
| Ali Saïbou | 10 November 1987 | 1988 | Ali Saïbou |
| Bagnou Beidou | 1988 | 1989 | Ali Saïbou |
| Amadou Cheiffou | 1991 | 1993 | Ali Saïbou |
| Maman Moussa | 1993 | 1993 | Mahamane Ousmane |
| Tahirou Amadou | 1993 | 1994 | Mahamane Ousmane |
| Abdou Labo | 1994 | 1995 | Mahamane Ousmane |
| Mahamane Doby | 1995 | 27 January 1996 | Mahamane Ousmane |
| Ousmane Issoufou Oubandawaki | 27 January 1996 | 1997 | Ibrahim Baré Maïnassara |
| Yahaya Tounkara | 1997 | 9 April 1999 | Ibrahim Baré Maïnassara |
| Moussa Moumouni Djermakoye | 9 April 1999 | 2000 | Daouda Malam Wanké |
| Mahaman Sabiou Daddy Gaoh | 2000 | 2002 | Mamadou Tandja |
| Hassane Souley | 2002 | 2007 | Mamadou Tandja |
| Djida Hamadou | 2007 | 18 February 2010 | Mamadou Tandja |
| Mamadou Ousseini | 18 February 2010 | 21 April 2011 | Salou Djibo |
| Karidjo Mahamadou | 21 April 2011 | 2016 | Mahamadou Issoufou |
| Hassoumi Massaoudou | 2016 | 2016 | Mahamadou Issoufou |
| Kalla Moutari | 2016 | 2019 | Mahamadou Issoufou |
| Issoufou Katambé | 2019 | 7 April 2021 | Mahamadou Issoufou |
| Alkassoum Indattou | 7 April 2021 | 26 July 2023 | Mohamed Bazoum |
| Salifou Modi | 10 August 2023 | Present | Abdourahamane Tiani |

== See also ==
- Government of Niger

== External link ==
- defense.gouv.ne
