= Haissa Mariko =

Nigerien parachutist

Haissa Hima, better known as Haissa Mariko (born 26 July 1951) was the first woman parachutist in Niger.

== Life ==
Haissa Mariko entered the Nigerien Army in 1966 and received her diploma in parachuting on 20 February 1967.
