= Government of Niger =

Authoritative body of Niger

The government of Niger is the apparatus through which authority functions and is exercised: the governing apparatus of Nigerien state. The current system of governance, since the Constitution of 25 November 2010, is termed the Seventh Republic of Niger. It is a semi-presidential republic, whereby the President of Niger is head of state and the Prime Minister of Niger head of government. The officials holding these posts are chosen through a representative democratic process of national and local elections, in the context of a competing multi-party system. Executive power is exercised by the government. Legislative power is vested in both the government and the National Assembly. The judiciary is independent of the executive and the legislature: its Constitutional Court has jurisdiction over constitutional and electoral matters.

National government, has, since 1999, been supplemented by locally elected officials, who in turn choose representatives at the Departmental and Regional levels. Prior to 1999, these levels of government had always been appointed by the central government.

Central governance is carried out by professional administrative agencies, directed by the Office of the President and/or the Ministries headed by members of the National Assembly appointed to the post by the President. The remainder of Ministry offices are filled by non-political professional administrators. Local governance is carried out by local, departmental, and regional councils, the Ministry of Territorial Collectivities, officials chosen by these elected bodies, and professional government employees.

== Constitution ==
The constitution of December 2009 was revised by national referendum on 25 November 2010. It restored the semi-presidential system of government of the 1999 constitution (Fifth Republic) in which the president of the republic, elected by universal suffrage for a five-year term, and a prime minister named by the president share executive power. As a reflection of Niger's increasing population, the unicameral National Assembly was expanded in 2004 to 113 deputies elected for a 5-year term under a majority system of representation. The National Assembly was then expanded again to 171 seats. Political parties must attain at least 5% of the vote in order to gain a seat in the legislature.

== Executive branch ==
The Head of State is the President of Niger. Under the 2010 Constitution, the President has many of the powers found under a Presidential System as head of executive, although the titular Head of Government is the Prime Minister of Niger.

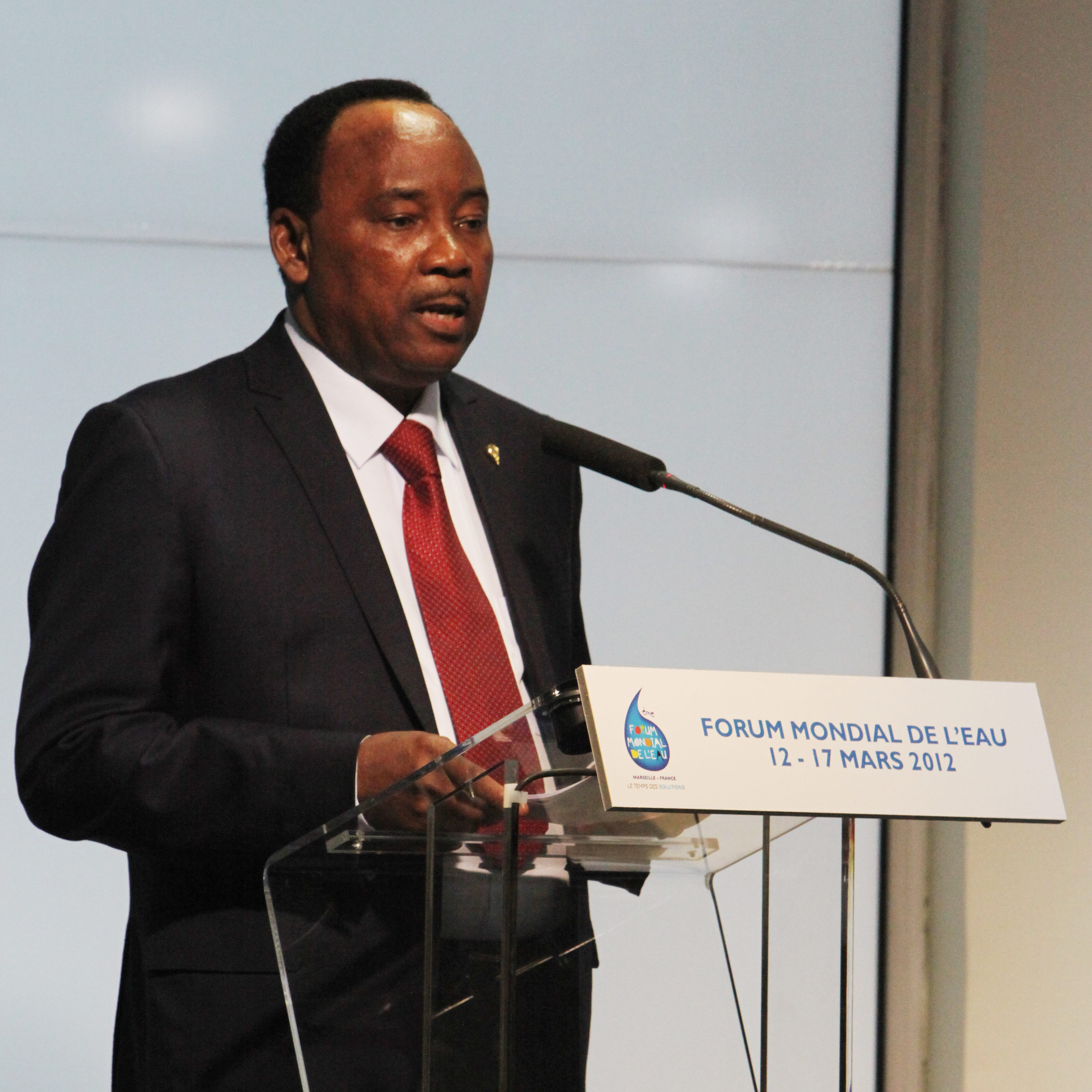
Mahamadou Issoufou, former President of Niger

Main office-holders
Office	Name	Party	Since
President of the National Council for the Safeguard of the Homeland	Abdourahamane Tiani	Niger Armed Forces	26 July 2023 – Present
Prime Minister	Ali Lamine Zeine		8 August 2023 – Present

Niger's 2010 constitution restores the semi-presidential system of government of the December 1992 constitution (Third Republic) in which the President of the Republic is elected by universal suffrage for a five-year term, and a prime minister, named by the president, share executive power. The Prime Minister is subject to recall by the National Assembly through a no confidence vote. The President may not remove the Prime Minister, but may dissolve the National Assembly (although this is limited to once every two years). The President, Prime Minister, or Legislature may propose legislation. Legislation is subject to Presidential Veto, which may be overridden by the National Assembly by a vote of 50%+1.

The Constitution of the Fifth Republic differs from that of the Third by giving greater powers to the President. The Third Republic faced intractable political crisis having found itself in 1995 in a "Cohabitation": a Prime Minister and President of different parties which were unable to forge a working consensus. The Fifth Republic resembles the Semi-Presidential system seen in the French Fifth Republic.

=== Ministries of Niger ===
Executive power is exercised through Ministerial appointment, made by the President of the Republic and authorised by the National Assembly. Ministers are seated in the Council of Ministers, which meets to advise the President and carry out his policies.

== Legislative branch ==
The National Assembly (Assemblée Nationale) has 171 members, elected for a five-year term, 158 members elected in multi-seat constituencies, 8 members elected in single-seat national minority constituencies and 5 seats reserved for Nigeriens living abroad. The multi-seat constituency members are elected using a party-list (Scrutin du liste) proportional representation system. For these seats, political parties must attain at least 5% of the vote in order to gain a seat in the legislature. The remaining eight seats are single constituency, elected by a first-past-the-post system. One element of the Judiciary of Niger, the High Court of Justice, is composed of Deputies elected from within the National Assembly.

The National Assembly has oversight of the executive in voting legislation, override of Presidential veto, vote of no-confidence of the Prime Minister, and the reserved right to nominate the Prime Minister. As well, the Assembly has recourse to publicly investigate the executive through Committee Hearings, Hearing in plenary sittings, Commissions of inquiry, formal parliamentary questions, "Question time", and Interpellations. There is no formal parliamentary Ombudsman oversight of government.

== Judicial branch ==
Niger's independent judicial system is composed of four higher courts – the Court of Appeals, the Supreme Court, the High Court of Justice and the Court of State Security.

== Other high government bodies ==
The 1999 constitution, as well as law since that date, created a number of government bodies. These are executive bodies, but which answer to both the National Assembly and the Presidency in varying degrees. For instance, the Nigerien National Commission on Human Rights and Fundamental Liberties is constitutionally mandated to be independent of all other bodies, reports to the president, and through later law has each member mandated to be chosen by a different non-governmental body (For instance, Human Rights commissions, Press unions, Legal professional organisations) and then approved by the President. Members tend to serve fixed terms and cannot be dismissed by other government officials. The rules for oversight, term, nomination, and approval of members of these bodies is different for each.

- Council of the Republic: a constitutionally mandated body made up of heads of each of the high courts, the high government bodies set out in the 1999 constitution, the President, Prime Minister, and President of the National Assembly. Originally created in the 1996 constitution as a rump upper legislative house, under the constitution of the Fifth Republic it may be called to govern in times of crisis, or to mediate political disputes. (The Mediator of the Republic was later created to take over this second function.) The Council met for the first time in June 2009.
- Nigerien National Commission on Human Rights and Fundamental Liberties (CNDH/LF). Article 33 of the constitution of 1999 created an official Commission to investigate and report upon human rights abuses. Its members are elected from several human rights associations, legal bodies, and government offices. The committee is composed of 19 members, elected for three-year terms by a variety of bodies set out in the constitution. It has no power to arrest, but it may investigate abuses either on its own volition or when charged by a victim. It reports to the President of Niger. Its head sits on the Council of the Republic.
- Independent National Electoral Commission (CENI) First created in at the beginning of the Third Republic of Niger to oversee elections, each of its seats are nominated by government or professional bodies fixed by law and approved by the President of Niger. Its dissolution in the run up to the post-coup 1996 elections caused a political crisis which led most political parties to boycott elections in the short lived Fourth Republic of Niger.
- Mediator of the Republic: established in 2008 to be a standing authority which could moderate disagreements in the implementation and interpretation of laws and regulations. The president appoints the mediator, who is an independent administrative authority charged with investigating citizens' complaints and trying to find amicable solutions.
- High Council for Communication: tasked by the constitution with ensuring access to the press and fairness in reporting, each seat is nominated by a press, human rights, or government body, and approved by the President. It has the power to sanction, close, or fine press outlets. Its head sits on the Council of the Republic.
- The High Council of Territorial Collectives (Haut Conseil des Collectivités Territoriales HCCT), a consultative representative body of local elected officials. These representatives are then indirectly elected to bodies at the Departmental and Regional levels, before choosing representatives to this national body, which meets yearly in Niamey.
- Association of Traditional Chiefs of Niger: a representative body drawn from the officially recognized traditional rulers of the pre-colonial states and localities. Its President sits on the Council of the Republic.
- Economic, Social, and Cultural Council of Niger. Its head sits on the Council of the Republic.

== Administrative divisions ==
The country is currently divided into eight Regions: Agadez, Diffa, Dosso, Maradi, Tahoua, Tillaberi, Zinder and Niamey (a capital district of coequal authority to a Region). These Regions are subdivided into 36 Departments. Administrative powers are also distributed among 265 communes.

=== Current administrative structure ===
The Regions are subdivided into Departments and communes. As of 2005, there were 36 départements, divided into 265 communes, 122 cantons and 81 groupements. The latter two categories cover all areas not covered by Urban Communes (population over 10000) or Rural Communes (population under 10000), and are governed by the department, whereas Communes have (since 1999) elected councils and mayors. Additional semi-autonomous sub-divisions include Sultanates, Provinces and Tributaries (tribus). The Nigerien government estimates there are an additional 17000 Villages administered by Rural Communes, while there are a number of Quartiers (boroughs or neighborhoods) administered by Urban Communes.

=== Restructuring ===
Prior to the devolution program on 1999–2006, these Regions were styled Departments. Confusingly, the next level down (Arrondissements) were renamed Departments.

=== 1992 division ===
Tillabéri department was created in 1992, when Niamey Region (then called "Niamey department") was split, with the area immediately outside Niamey renamed as the "Niamey Urban Community", operating as co-equal with the other seven Regions of Niger.

=== Historical evolution ===
Prior to independence, Niger was divided into sixteen Cercles as second level administration divisions: Agadez, Birni N'Konni, Dogondoutchi, Dosso, Filingué, Gouré, Madaoua, Magaria, Maradi, N'Guigmi, Niamey, Tahoua, Téra, Tessaoua, Tillabéry, and Zinder. Their capitals had the same names as the cercle.

After independence, the 31 December 1961 Law of territorial organization created 31 circonscriptions. The 16 colonial cercles continued to exist, and served as a level of division above these circonscriptions. Four cercles (Dogondoutchi, Filingué, N'Guigmi, and Téra) had only one circonscription. The Law of August 14, 1964 then reorganized the country into seven departments, adopting the French second level administration naming system, in contrast to neighbor Mali, which retained the colonial Cercles and Regions.

== Enforcement and force ==
The civilian central government of Niger maintains a monopoly on force within its borders. Both the Military of Niger and Law enforcement trace their authority eventually to the President of the Republic, through Ministries and their controlling Minister. The Military and Gendarmerie (Police responsible for enforcement outside urban areas) are commanded through the Ministry of Defence. The Police Nationale and the Nigerien Internal Security Forces (FNIS) paramilitary police are controlled through the Ministry of Interior, Public Safety and Decentralization. The Judicial and Tax police (Douanes) are controlled through the Ministry of Finance. All ministries ultimately report to the Head of State.

== Foreign Affairs ==
Foreign relations are carried out by the President, as Head of State, as well as through the Ministry of Foreign Affairs of Niger. Treaties are subject to consultation by the National Assembly and the Constitutional Court has jurisdiction to rule upon compliance with international treaties and agreements.

=== International organization participation ===
Niger is a member of the following organizations: ACCT, ACP, AfDB, CCC, ECA, ECOWAS, Entente, FAO, FZ, G-77, IAEA, IBRD, ICAO, ICC, ICFTU, ICRM, IDA, IDB, IFAD, IFC, IFRCS, ILO, IMF, Intelsat, Interpol, IOC, ITU, MIPONUH, NAM, OAU, OIC, OPCW, UN, UNCTAD, UNESCO, UNIDO, UNWTO, UPU, WADB, WAEMU, WCL, WFTU, WHO, WIPO, WMO, and WTO.

== See also ==
- Politics of Niger
