= Rhissa Ag Boula =

Nigerien politician

Minister of Tourism
- In office 1996 – April 1999
- President: Ibrahim Bare Mainassara
- In office 1999–2004
- President: Mamadou Tandja

Leader of the Council of Resistance for the Republic
- Incumbent
- Assumed office 9 August 2023

Personal details
- Born: 1957 (age 68–69) Tchirozerine
- Party: CRR
- Other political affiliations: FLAA; UDPS-Amana
- Relations: Mohamed Ag Boula (brother)

Rhissa Ag Boula (born 1957) is a Nigerien Tuareg politician and former leader of rebel factions in both the 1990–1995 and the 2007–2009 Tuareg based Insurgencies. He was Nigerien Minister of Tourism from 1996 to 1999, and again from 1999 to 2004. His arrest on murder charges in 2004 precipitated armed conflict between his supporters and the Niger government. A political leader following the 1995 peace, he again joined a rebel faction from abroad in 2007, creating his own faction from abroad in 2008, and joining the peace process in 2009. In 2010 he was again arrested after returning to Niger.

In 2023 he announced the creation of the Council of Resistance for the Republic which aimed to topple the junta and restore Bazoum to office. He also said that it supported international intervention by ECOWAS and other actors to oust the junta.

== Political activity ==
=== 1990s–2000s ===
Ag Boula was leader of the 1990s Front for the Liberation of Aïr and Azaouak (FLAA), one of the two main rebel groups in the conflict. Rhissa and Mano Dayak became joint leaders of the combined front which negotiated a peace deal with the Nigerien government, the Armed Resistance Organization (ORA). After the 15 April 1995 "Ouagadougou Accords" peace agreement and the 1996 Nigerien coup d'état, Ag Boula continued his political advocacy under coup President Ibrahim Bare Mainassara and was made Minister of Tourism of Niger from 1997 to April 1999. In this role, he advocated for greater international tourism in the Agadez Region. Following the 1999 coup and the return to democracy, he was again (1999–2004) appointed Tourism Minister under President Mamadou Tandja. Ag Boula was on the Executive of the Union for Democracy and Social Progress-Amana party from its founding in 1990 until 2005, and party president 2005–2008.

=== 2004 arrest ===
In 2004 he was named as an accomplice in the 26 January murder of ruling MNSD party activist Adam Amangue in Tchirozerine. Ag Boula was sacked as a Minister on 13 February, and on 14 July convicted of ordering the murder by three other men. Beginning in July 2005, several Tuareg former insurgents led by Rhissa's brother Mohamed Ag Boula, began a series of attacks in the north, culminating in the kidnap three Nigerien police officers and one soldier, demanding the release of the former Minister.

A Libyan negotiation resulted in the provisional release of Ag Boula in March 2005, a month after the safe release of the hostages.

=== 2007–2009 rebellion ===
In 2007 a renewed rebellion broke out in northern Niger, in part claiming the 1995 accords were not being honored. Ag Boula at first attempted to mediate on behalf of the rebels from exile in Europe. In January 2008 he announced he was joining the rebel movement, provoking condemnation from the government in Niamey. Ag Boula's provisional release on the 2004 charges was withdrawn, and a court convicted him in absentia of murder. On 13 July 2008, a Nigerien court sentenced him to death. In late 2008 Ag Boula announced he was forming his own faction of the rebel movement, the FFR. In 2009, the FFR joined the Libyan sponsored peace process that resulted in the May 2009 end of the conflict and a general amnesty for crimes committed in the course of the insurgency.

=== 2010s ===
Following the 18 February 2010 coup d'état against the Nigerien government, Ag Boula and other former rebel leaders returned to Niamey, pressuring the junta to speed up the reintegration of former rebels. On 29 March Ag Boula was arrested in Niamey, along with Kindo Zada, an Army Major who deserted to the rebels in 2007. Both were presumed by the press to investigated for crimes unrelated to the 2007–2009 rebellion.

On December 4, 2010, charges against him were dismissed by the Criminal Court of Niamey and he was cleared of all suspicion.

In January 2011 Ag Boula was elected Regional Councilor of Agadez for a term of four years, and in September 2011 appointed adviser to the President of the Republic, Mahamadou Issoufou.

In September, Ag Boula was reported to be seen leading a large convoy entering Niger from Libya consisting of more than a dozen pickup trucks with well-armed Libyan troops. Ag Boula denied he was in the convoy.

He opposed the Azawad rebellion in Mali in January 2012.

=== 2023 Nigerien coup d'état ===
Following the 2023 Nigerien coup d'état, Ag Boula announced the formation of a Council of Resistance for the Republic (CRR), which aimed to topple the military junta of Niger and restore Mohamed Bazoum as President of Niger, on 9 August. He also said that it supported international intervention by ECOWAS and other actors in doing so. In 2024, Rhissa Ag Boula obtains asylum seeker status in France.

== See also ==
- Tuareg Rebellion (2007–2009)
- 2023 Nigerien crisis
- Council of Resistance for the Republic
