= Union for Democracy and Social Progress (Niger) =

Political party in Niger

The Union for Democracy and Social Progress (French: Union pour la démocratie et le progrès social, UDPS-Amana) is a centrist political party in Niger. With its support base in the Tuareg people of northern Niger, the party's history is tied to that of the Tuareg rights movements which surrounded the Tuareg insurgencies of 1990–95 and 2007–09. Its slogan, "Amana", is a Hausa language word for "Trust"

== History ==
The party was founded in 1990 by Rhissa Ag Boula, with Mohamed Abdoullahi becoming party president in 1992. In the 1993 parliamentary elections it received only 463 votes, but won a single seat in the National Assembly. Following Mahamane Ousmane's victory in the subsequent presidential elections, the party joined the ruling Alliance of the Forces of Change, with the UDPS' Ben Wahab Aïchatou became Niger's first female minister when she was appointed Minister of Traditional Commerce and Arts.

In the 1995 parliamentary elections the party won two seats after receiving 3% of the vote, and supported the National Movement for the Development of Society-led government of Hama Amadou. In 1996 Akoli Daouel became party president and the party won three seats in the early elections that year, after which it supported the ruling party of General Ibrahim Baré Maïnassara until 1997. The 1999 elections saw the party lose its parliamentary representation. It did not participate in the 2004 elections. Rhissa Ag Boula became party president in 2005, serving until 2008.

Although the party returned to contest the 2009 elections, they again failed to win a seat. They did not participate in the 2011 elections. The 2016 elections saw the party run, but remain seatless after receiving only 0.1% of the vote.
