= Council of Resistance for the Republic =

2023 Nigerien political faction

- Conseil de la résistance pour la République
- Founder: Rhissa Ag Boula
- Leader: Rhissa Ag Boula
- Founded: 9 August 2023
- Dates active: 9 August 2023–present
- Headquarters: Niamey, Niger
- Active regions: Niger

The Council of Resistance for the Republic (French: Conseil de la résistance pour la République, CRR) or also called Free Armed Forces is a group led by former rebel Leader Rhissa Ag Boula which aims to topple the National Council for the Safeguard of the Homeland and restore Mohamed Bazoum as President of Niger following his ousting by the military in the 2023 Nigerien coup d'état in July 2023.

The group was founded on 9 August 2023 by Rhissa Ag Boula, former Leader of the rebel group Front for the Liberation of Aïr and Azaouak (FLAA) that participated in two rebellions by the Tuareg people in the 1990s and the 2000s, who accused the Nigerien military junta of orchestrating a "tragedy", referring to its coup against President Bazoum. Ag Boula said he supported intervention by ECOWAS to restore Bazoum to power. Another CRR member said several Nigerien political figures had joined the group but refused to come out publicly for safety reasons.

== See also ==
- 2023 Nigerien crisis
