= Party for National Unity and Democracy =

Political party in Niger

The Party for National Unity and Democracy (French: Parti pour l'unité nationale et la démocratie, PUND–Salama) is a small political party in Niger. Its slogan "Salama", is an Arabic loan word meaning "Peace" in the Hausa language. Its support base is amongst the Tuareg and other communities in the north of Niger.

== History ==
Established in 1992 by Akoli Daouel, the party received 0.1% of the vote in the 1993 parliamentary elections, failing to win a seat. However, after increasing its vote share to 2.4% in the 1995 elections, it won three seats. It subsequently joined the Alliance of the Forces of Change coalition of President Mahamane Ousmane. In the 1996 elections it lost parliamentary representation.

The party did not contest the 1999 general elections, but ran in the 2004 parliamentary elections, failing to win a seat. Despite increasing its vote share from 0.1% to 1.4%, it remained seatless following the 2009 elections. It did not run in the 2011 general elections, but contested the 2016 parliamentary elections, again failing to win a seat.
