= Judiciary of Niger =

Judiciary body of Niger

The judiciary of Niger was established with the creation of the Fourth Republic in 1999. The constitution of December 1992 was revised by national referendum on 12 May 1996 and, again, by referendum, revised to the current version on 18 July 1999. It is an inquisitorial system based on the Napoleonic Code, established in Niger during French colonial rule and the 1960 constitution of Niger. The Court of Appeals reviews questions of fact and law, while the Supreme Court reviews application of the law and constitutional questions. The High Court of Justice (HCJ) deals with cases involving senior government officials. The justice system also includes civil criminal courts, customary courts, traditional mediation, and a military court. The military court provides the same rights as civil criminal courts; however, customary courts do not. The military court cannot try civilians.

The judicial system was changed following the 2023 Nigerien coup d'état.

== Judicial structure ==
Prior to the 2023 Nigerien coup d'état, Niger's independent judicial system was composed of four higher courts — the Court of Appeals, the Supreme Court, the High Court of Justice and the Court of State Security — as well as lower criminal, civil and appeals courts.

- The Supreme Court of Niger is the highest judicial body of the State in administrative, judicial and financial matters. The Supreme Court hears cases appealed from lower civil and criminal courts, it only rules on the application of the law and constitutional questions: the lower Courts of Appeals may decide appeals on questions of fact and law.
- The Court of Appeals of Niger, one in each of Niger's eight regions, reviews questions of fact and law in criminal and civil law, and rulings may be appealed to the Supreme Court of Niger.
- The Constitutional Court of Niger has jurisdiction over constitutional and electoral matters, and is a provisionally organised court, what the French legal system terms a cour d'exception. It is responsible for ruling on the constitutionality of laws and ordinances, as well as compliance with international treaties and agreements. The Court includes seven members. These seven members are chosen for six-year terms, renewable for two-year terms thereafter. The president of the court is chosen by the other member for three years. They are not removable. They must include certain professions chosen by certain institutions, and nominated by the President It may be called upon to provide rulings by certain constitutional triggers (elections, referendum, constitution revision) or by the request of the President, the Speaker of the National Assembly, or by the vote of one-fifth of the members of the national assembly. When called upon to give binding rulings it is the final arbiter, and rulings must be carried out in 30 days. Most recently it came into prominence when required to offer a non-binding ruling of President Mamadou Tandja's plan for a referendum on a new constitution. Its opposition, presented on 26 May 2009, triggered the President's dismissal of the National Assembly.
- Crimes or misdemeanors committed by government officials in the exercise of their office are tried in the High Court of Justice, a cour d'exception. This court is composed of seven deputies elected from within the National Assembly on a provisional basis, and organised and instructed by the Supreme Court of Niger.
- The State Security Court, established under the rule of Seyni Kountché in the 1970s is a military court for trying offenses committed by the military and police, but also enabling the military of Niger to try civilians accused of crimes touching upon state secrets, defense, espionage, or internal security. The closing of the court was one of the first acts of the 1991 National Assembly, which led to the Third Republic. In 2007, some elements of the court were reestablished, but it may no longer try civilians.

=== Criminal and civil courts ===
Nigeren law is based on the French legal system, in which investigative judges develop and bring to trial criminal cases which they judge. Criminal courts are based on this "investigating magistrate" system. Appeals courts – up to and including the Supreme Court of Niger – are panels of professional judges who hear criminal appeals. This system was changed following the 2023 Nigerien coup d'état.

==== Criminal trial procedure ====
The 1999 constitution and Nigerien law require a warrant for an arrest, and this generally is observed in practice, outside areas under special states of emergency, such as the entire Agadez Region between 2007 and 2009. Judges and prosecutors weigh evidence and issue warrants accordingly. Persons are brought before an independent judiciary.

Those arrested must be notified of their right to a lawyer within 24 hours of detention. Nigerien law allows individuals to be detained initially for up to 48 hours without charge, and allows an additional 48-hour detention period if police need more time to gather evidence. Detainees have a right to prompt judicial determination. Security forces must inform detainees of the charges against them promptly. Law provides for a maximum pretrial confinement of 30 months for serious crimes and 12 months for minor offenses, with special extensions in certain sensitive cases.

The law affirms the presumption of innocence. Trials are public, and juries are used. Defendants have the right to counsel, including counsel at public expense for minors and indigent defendants charged with crimes carrying a sentence of 10 years or more. There is a functioning bail system for crimes carrying a penalty of fewer than 10 years' imprisonment. Indigents are provided a lawyer by the government. Widespread ignorance of the law and lack of financial means prevented many from fully exercising their right to an attorney and using the bail system. Defendants also have the right to be present at trial, to confront witnesses, and to present witnesses on their own behalf. The government has a legal obligation to inform defendants of all evidence against them, and defendants have access to government-held evidence. Defendants may appeal verdicts, first to the court of appeals and then to the Supreme Court. Significant changes were made following the 2023 Nigerien coup d'état.

=== Civil Judicial system ===
Civil law in Niger is modeled on the French droit civil (civil law). Courts of civil procedure in each major city which hear lawsuits related to civil matters and can apply judicial remedies, while a single appellate entity is responsible for administrative remedies.

=== Customary courts ===
Traditional chiefs can act as mediators and counselors and have authority in customary law cases as well as status under national law where they are designated as auxiliaries to local officials. Under customary courts and traditional mediation, individuals do not have the same legal protections as those using the formal court systems. They have authority to arbitrate in many customary law matters, including marriage, inheritance, land, and community disputes, but not in all civil issues. Chiefs receive government stipends, but have no police or judicial powers.

Customary courts, which try civil law cases, are based largely on Islamic law and local tradition, and are located only in large towns and cities. A legal practitioner with basic legal training, advised by an assessor knowledgeable in the society's traditions, heads these courts. The judicial actions of chiefs and customary courts are not regulated by formal law, and defendants can appeal a verdict in the formal court system.

== Legal profession ==
Criminal and civil attorneys are titled avocat (advocate): the equivalent of the French avocat. An avocat is authorized to act in all legal matters between his client and other parties, including representation before a court.

Other legal professionals are notaires, legal technicians authorized to handle civil and commercial matters such as inheritance and other family law (except divorce), real estate, leases, mortgages, contracts and other business matters.

Should a case go before a court, however, a notaire must call upon the services of an avocat to represent his client. Both avocats and notaires carry the title "Maître" as a matter of honor.

== Prison system ==
Niger has thirty-five prisons, but these have been criticized for poor operations and overcrowding.

== Reported violations of rights ==
=== Judicial procedure ===
While citizens of Niger are provided with broad legal rights before the law, government interference, corruption, poverty, and a widespread ignorance of the law prevents many accused from taking full advantage of these rights. Although lawyers provide counsel per government request, the government general has a history of failing to remunerate them. Women do not have equal legal status with men in customary courts and traditional mediation, and do not enjoy the same access to legal redress.

According to the United States government, there were reports in 2008 that several persons were detained arbitrarily under the state of alert. Detainees involved with sensitive cases were sometimes held longer than legally permitted.

There were serious backlogs in the judicial system. Some persons waited as long as six years to be tried. At the end of 2008, 70 percent of the prisoners in Niamey's civil prison were awaiting trial. Such trial delays have been attributed to lengthy legal procedures, inadequate resources, staff shortages, and corruption.

=== Judicial impartiality ===
Although the constitution and law provide for an independent judiciary, this has not been the case in practice under the Hamani Diori government (1960–74) and the three following military regimes (1974–91, 1996–99, 1999). Under the post-1999 Fifth Republic of Niger the executive branch has been accused of interfering with the judicial process, especially in high-profile cases, or in cases having to do with press freedoms. Amnesty International and Reporters Without Borders have charged the government of Niger with politically motivated arrests, trials, detentions, and rulings in cases against members of the press critical of the government. Corruption and inefficiency remain problems within the judicial system. Judges are reported to sometimes fear reassignment or having their financial benefits reduced if they render a decision unfavorable to the government. In civil matters there were reports that family and business ties influenced lower court decisions. In some instances judges granted provisional release pending trial to high-profile defendants. These defendants were seldom called back for trial, and had complete freedom of movement and could leave the country.

A 2008 public opinion poll found that only 49% of Nigeriens had confidence in their judicial system, down from 56% in 2006.

At the same time, local civil judicial courts are considered by the United States government to be generally independent and impartial, and there is access to seek damages for human rights violations. One such case was the much publicised suit by a woman who successfully sued the Nigerien government for failing to enforce anti-slavery legislation in 2008.

== See also ==
- Law enforcement in Niger
