= Gendarmerie Nationale (Niger) =

Paramilitary police force of Niger

National Gendarmerie of Niger Gendarmerie Nationale Nigérienne
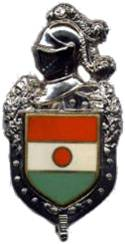
- Emblem

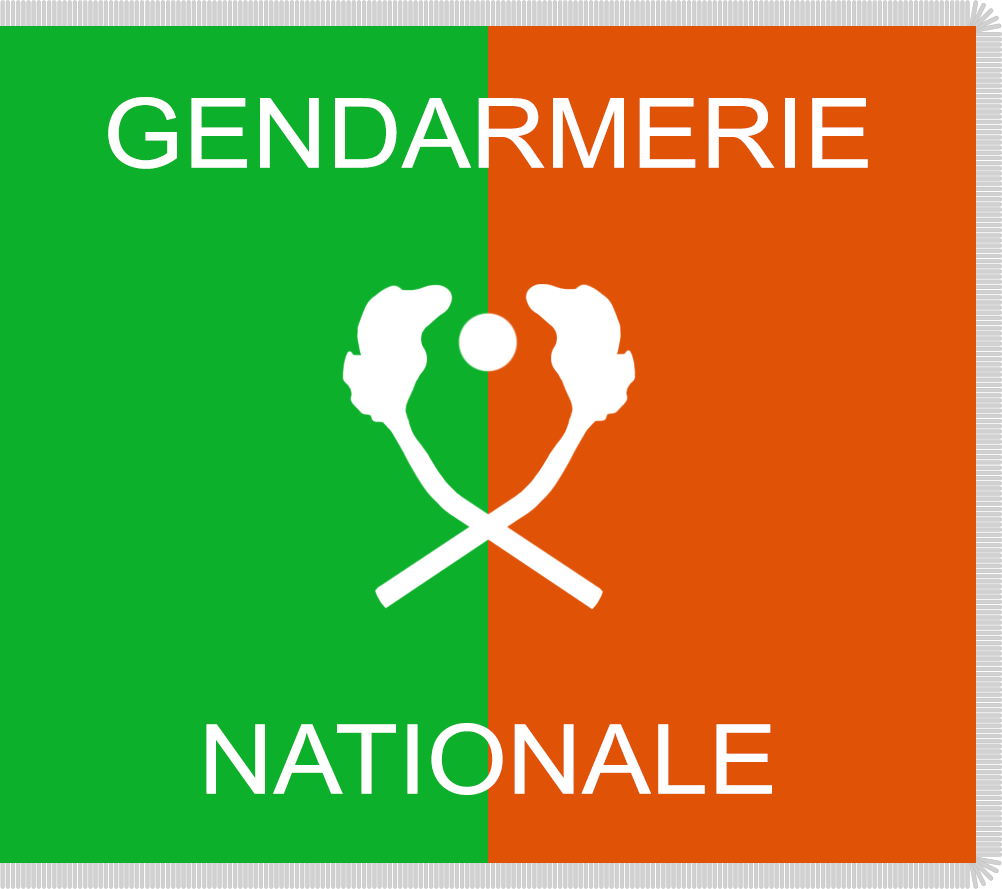
- Flag

Agency overview
- Formed: 1962
- Preceding agency: Republican Guard

Jurisdictional structure
- Operations jurisdiction: Niger
- General nature: Gendarmerie

Operational structure
- Agency executive: General of Brigade, Issa Mounkaila
- Parent agency: Ministry of Defense

The Gendarmerie Nationale (French: Gendarmerie Nationale Nigérienne) is the national gendarmerie of Niger. The Gendarmerie Nationale are under the Niger Armed Forces and report to the Ministry of Defense. They are responsible for law enforcement in rural areas. Niger's civilian police force, the National Police, is a separate agency under the Ministry of Interior, Public Safety and Decentralization, and are responsible for policing in urban areas.

The Gendarmerie Nationale numbers approximately 3,700 members. The Gendarmerie Nationale is modeled on the National Gendarmerie of its former colonial power, France. As a paramilitary, it is uniformed, ranked and trained in military fashion.

The Gendarmerie Nationale sponsors a semi-professional football club, Union Sportive de la Gendarmerie Nationale, which plays in the Super Ligue.

== History ==
Following the creation of the Republic of Niger and in anticipation of its independence, the Gendarmerie Nationale began transferring leadership to Nigerien officers. In August 1962, Lieutenant Badie Garba replaced Captain Maurice Dapremont then Superior Commander of the Gendarmerie Nationale, becoming the first Nigerien head of the Gendarmerie.

When the Police Nationale was moved to the Ministry of Interior in 2003, the FNIS fell under their jurisdiction, while the Gendarmerie remained under the Nigerien Ministry of Defense.

== Structure and organization ==
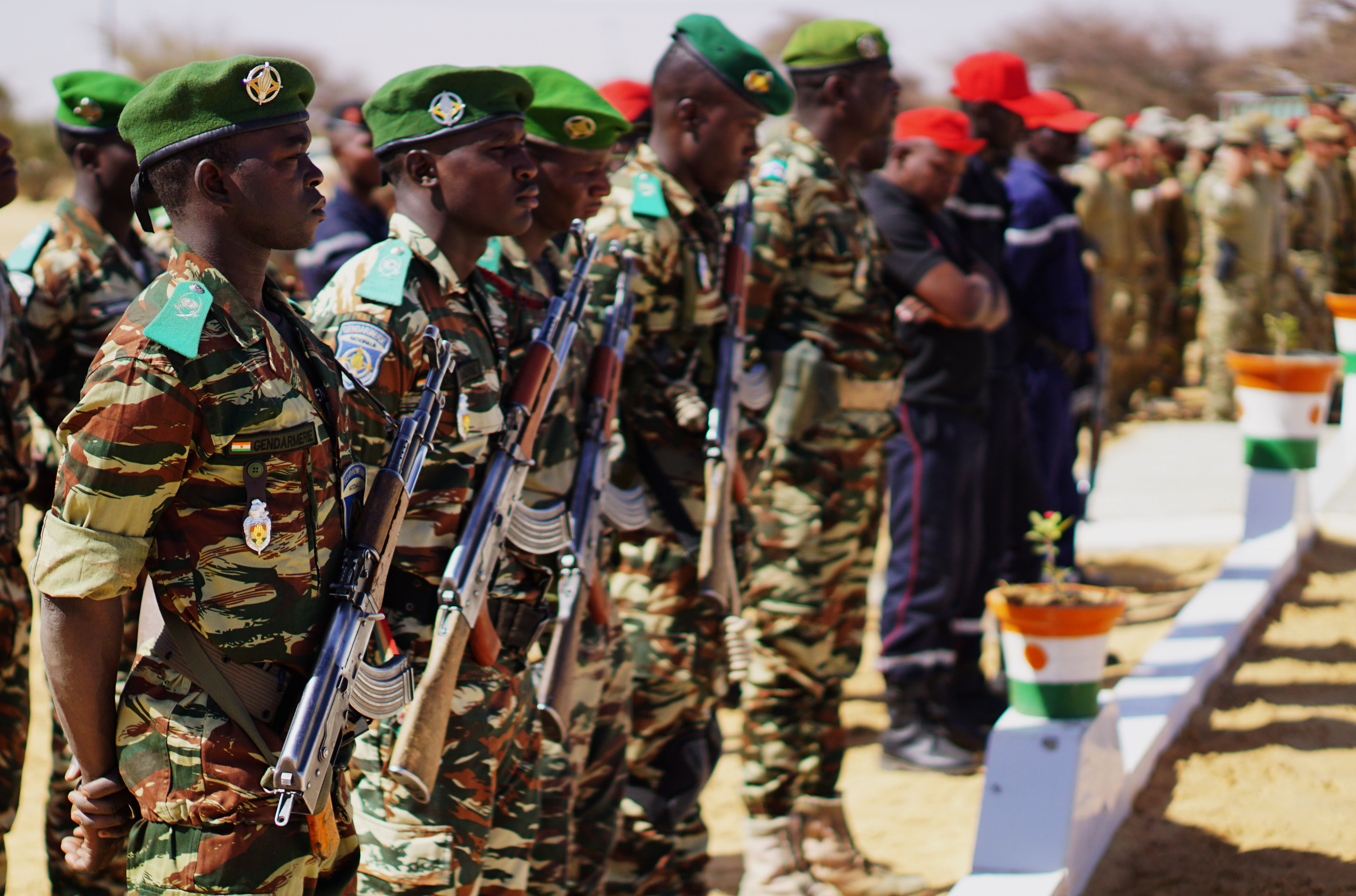
Nigerien gendarmes in Diffa, February 2017.

The Gendarmerie Nationale is headquartered in Niamey and has four regional Groupements based in Niamey, Agadez, Maradi, and Zinder. A highway police unit known as the Brigade Routière is also a part of the Gendarmerie Nationale, charged with providing security to the nation's highways. The unit mainly operates highway checkpoints.

=== Specialised units ===
The GN includes police patrol and institutional security units, as well as specialised units, including a Niamey Motorcycle Unit (Peloton de sécurité routière de Niamey) for traffic and VIP escort duty, a Telecommunications section (Division Télécommunication de la Gendarmerie), and a nautical unit (Gendarmerie Fluviale).

==== Fluvial Brigade ====
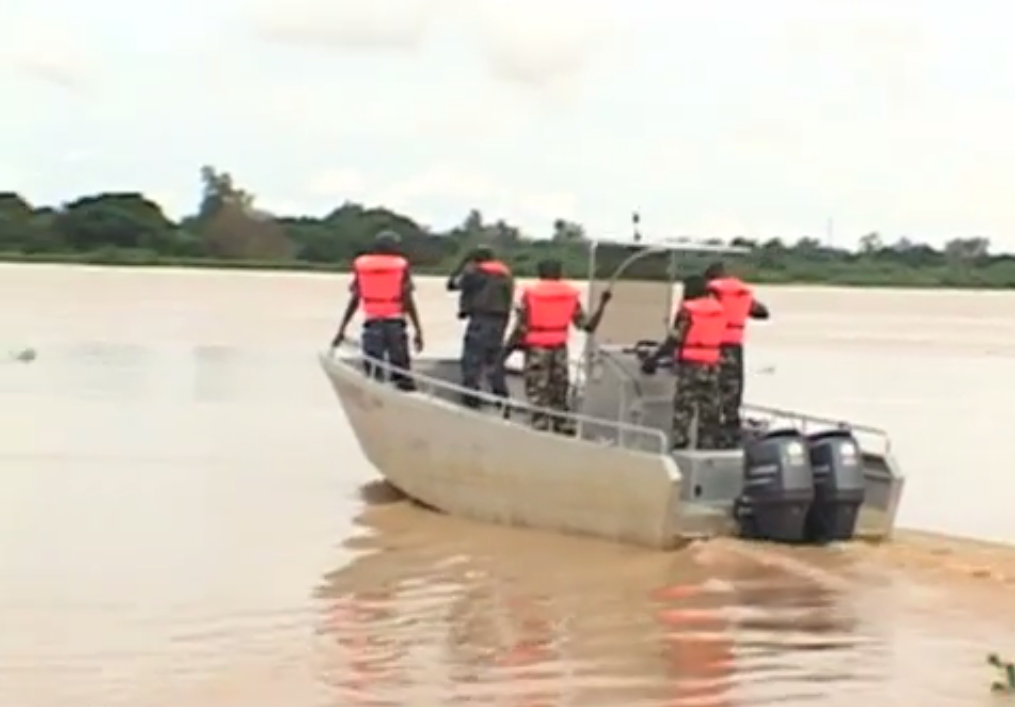
The Fluvial brigade of the Gendarmerie Nationale of Niger on a training on the Niger river in Niamey

In the wake of the Boko Haram insurgency in Nigeria and the Tuareg Rebellion of 2007–2009 in Mali, Niger has moved to ensure adequate patrolling of the Niger River in Niger. The goal of this brigade is to ensure safety of people and resources on the river and to prevent trafficking in any nature that might contribute to the regional conflicts. The Fluvial Brigade of the Gendarmerie Nationale was created in 2008 and equipped with three patrol boats acquired from France. The role of this brigade is to conduct riverine patrols in Niamey, Tillaberi, and Gaya. This brigade works closely with custom services to address fluvial and riverine trafficking on the Niger river. Training and exchanges are carried out with regional partners such as Mali and Senegal as well as France. The latter has also provided logistical support in the form of patrol boats.

=== Ranks ===
Rank group	General / flag officers				Senior officers			Junior officers
National Gendarmerie of Niger
National Gendarmerie of Niger	Général d'armée	Général de corps d'armée	Général de division	Général de brigade	Colonel	Lieutenant-colonel	Commandant	Capitaine	Lieutenant	Sous-lieutenant

Rank group	Senior NCOs					Junior NCOs		Enlisted
National Gendarmerie of Niger
National Gendarmerie of Niger	Major	Adjudant-chef	Adjudant	Maréchal des logis chef	Maréchal des logis	Gendarme de 1^{re} classe	Gendarme de 2^{e} classe	Gendarme de 3^{e} classe	Gendarme de 4^{e} classe	Gendarme auxiliaire

== School and Training ==
As of 2008, training of the Gendarmerie Nationale is conducted at the National Gendarmerie School (L'école nationale de la Gendarmerie) at Koira Tagui in Niamey. Training was previously conducted at Camp Tondibiah, a military base in Niamey and the primary training center for the Army corps. The first graduating class of the school included 1000 gendarmes, of whom 70 were women.

== See also ==
- Law enforcement in Niger
