= Mamane Oumarou =

Nigerien politician

Mamane Oumarou (born 1945) is a Nigerien politician who served two brief periods as Prime Minister of Niger during the 1980s. He has been Mediator of the Republic since 2008.

A Kanuri from the eastern part of the country, he was Ambassador to Canada, then Mayor of Maradi and Minister of Youth, Sports, and Culture under Seyni Kountché. Kountché appointed him as Prime Minister on 24 January 1983, but in November 1983 he instead made Oumarou the head of the National Council for Development, where he served until 1988.

Kountché's successor Ali Saïbou appointed Oumarou as Prime Minister again in May 1989, but eliminated the position in December 1989.

Oumarou served for a time as Ambassador to Saudi Arabia. He was appointed Mediator of the Republic by President Mamadou Tandja on 19 August 2008.
