= Temoust Liberation Front =

- Front de Libération Tamoust
- Founder: Mano Dayak
- Leaders: Mano Dayak (1993-1995); Mohamed Akotey (1995-1997)
- Dates active: June 1993 - 1997
- Dissolved: 1997
- Split from: Front for the Liberation of Aïr and Azaouak
- Active regions: Niger
- Ideology: More autonomy for Tuaregs within Niger or Tuareg independence
- Wars: Tuareg rebellion (1990-1995)

The Temoust Liberation Front (FLT), or Tamoust Liberation Front was a Tuareg militant group that operated in Niger between 1993 and 1997.

== History ==
"Temoust" means identity in the Tuareg language. The FLT was created in June 1993 after breaking off from the Aïr and Azawak Liberation Front, a rebel group in the 1990-95 Tuareg rebellion. It was founded by Mano Dayak, who was also the FLT's first president. In September 1993, the FLT met with other armed groups, including the FLAA, within the Coordination of Armed Resistance. Following Dayak's death in December 1995, Mohamed Akotey took over the FLT.

The Temoust Liberation Front was dissolved in 1997 after the Additional Peace Agreements of Algiers. Its former spokesperson, Aoutchiki Kriska, was named special advisor of Tuareg affairs to President Ibrahim Baré Maïnassara at the end of 1997.
