= Dyak =

Dyak may refer to one of the following.

- Dayak people, also called "Dyak", a native tribe of Borneo
- Dyak (clerk) a historical position of head of office in Russia

== See also ==
- Dayak (disambiguation)
