= Ministry of Interior, Public Safety and Decentralization (Niger) =

Government ministry in Niger

The Ministry of Interior, Public Safety and Decentralization of the Government of Niger is the government authority responsible for policing, internal security and the ongoing process of decentralization of authority to the Regions, Departments, and Communes of Niger. The National Police and National Guard of Niger report to the Interior Minister. Unlike the Interior ministry in some nations, courts, Justice, and prosecution are handled by the Ministry of Justice of Niger. The Civil Defense Directorate, which coordinates disaster, fire, and civil defense responses nationwide reports to the Ministry of the Interior. The Ministry of the Interior is headed by the Minister of State for the Interior, Public Safety and Decentralization, a political appointment who sits in the Council of Ministers of Niger, reporting directly to the President of Niger.

== Interior ==
Interior and border control, including some policing duties, are carried out through the General Directorate of Territorial Administration (Direction Générale de l’Administration Territoriale), which consists of the eight Regional Governorates (now administrative posts, previously the appointed governors of the eight regions) (see Regions of Niger), the Directorate of General Affairs and Transborder Administrative Cooperation (Direction des Affaires Générales et de la Coopération Administrative Transfront), and the Directorate of Decentralization (Direction de la décentralisation et du contentieux territorial).

== Public safety ==
"Public Safety" was appended to the title in 2004 when the National Police and National Guard of Niger (then known as FNIS) were transfer to the Interior Ministry from the Defense Ministry of Niger.

== Decentralization ==
Decentralization was appended to the title by the 1999 constitution. The Minister of Interior in previous governments was the head of local government institutions. Following the move to decentralize government powers in the 1990s, most of the duties of the local appointed Prefect—who was chosen and answered to the Ministry—was taken over by the Communes of Niger, as well as the Departments and Regions. The Ministry of Interior still appoints prefects, but they play a much more limited role, as local representatives of national government. In some largely uninhabited areas, especially those in the Sahara Desert, the Interior Ministry still appoints heads of Postes Administratif (Administrative Posts). Previously drawn from the Military of Niger they now are officers of the National Guard of Niger.

== Previous heads of Ministry ==
Below is a partial list of former Interior Ministry chiefs (Minister of the Interior of Niger):

- Hamadou Adamou Souley 2021–2023
- Alkache Alhada 2021
- Mohamed Bazoum April 2016 – 2021
- Hassoumi Massaoudou 2013–2016
- Abdou Labo 2011–2013
- Cisse Ibrahima Ousmane 2010–2011
- Albadé Abouba 1 March 2007 – 18 February 2010
- Mounkaïla Mody 30 December 2004 – 1 March 2007
- Albadé Abouba 9 November 2002 – 20 December 2004
- Laoualy Amadou 17 September 2001 – 9 November 2002
- Mahamane Manzo 5 January 2000 – 17 December 2001
- Lieutenant-colonel Boureïma Moumouni 16 April 1999 – 5 January 2000.
- Military-council 9 April 1999 – 16 April 1999
- Souley Abdoulaye 1 December 1997 – 9 April 1999
- Idi Ango Omar 23 August 1996 – 1 December 1997.
- Military-council 27 January 1996 – 23 August 1996
- Mamadou Tandja 1990–1991
- Seyni Kountché 1981–?
- Mamadou Tandja 1979–1981
- Sani Souna Sido 1974
- Diamballa Yansambou Maiga 1958–1974

== See also ==
- Law enforcement in Niger
- Government of Niger
- 2023 Nigerien Crisis
