= Law enforcement in Niger =

Law enforcement in Niger is the responsibility of the Ministry of Defense though the National Gendarmerie and the Ministry of the Interior through the National Police and the National Guard, a paramilitary police force.

== Organization ==
The 1999 Constitution brought about a reorganization of the law enforcement organization in Niger. The National Police, the National Guard (then the National Forces of Intervention and Security (NFIS or FNIS in French)) were removed from the jurisdiction of the Ministry of Defense and placed under the control of the Ministry of the Interior. The Ministry of Defense retained control of the Gendarmerie Nationale which is responsible for national policing outside urban areas.

The law enforcement system of Niger and the criminal justice system of Niger are both modeled after their counterparts in the French systems. The police emergency telephone number is 17.

== The National Police ==
The national police is led by a Director General of the National Police who answers to the Ministry of Interior. The National Police has several responsibilities: public security (policing and security, prevention), judicial police (investigation and prosecution), territorial surveillance and general surveillance (general or specialized surveillance as well as administrative investigations). Of all the responsibilities, public safety is the most important focus of the national police in terms of resource allocations. However, in recent years, increasing resources are being devoted to territorial surveillance as terrorist threats in the region have increased since the fall of the Libyan regime and the beginning of crisis in the north of Mali. Each of the eight regions of Niger has a regional office of public safety, whose director has authority over all police elements in the region. Public safety is ensured by the police precincts in urban areas and are responsible maintaining public order as well as fight minor crimes (theft, assault, fraud, violence, etc..). The judicial police deals high delinquency and organized crimes.

== National Guard of Niger ==
Formerly known as the National Forces of Intervention and Security, the National Guard of Niger is responsible for security in rural areas where the national police is absent. It is overseen by the superior commander of the National Guard who reports to the Ministry of Interior. This body is responsible for: border and territorial surveillance of the country, public safety, maintaining and restoring of order, protecting public buildings and institutions, people and their property, the execution of the administrative police in rural and pastoral areas, management and monitoring of prisons, humanitarian actions in the case of national disaster or crisis and protection of the environment. It is also responsible for providing security to administrative authorities and the diplomatic and consular representations of Niger abroad.

== The National Gendarmerie ==
The National Gendarmerie is commanded by the Superior Commander of the National Gendarmerie. Unlike the National Police and the National Guard, the National Gendarmerie is under the control of the Ministry of Defense of Niger. It is divided between territorial brigades and mobile brigades. In addition to territorial defense and maintaining public order, it provides military and paramilitary justice to other corps of the armed forces and participates to the judicial and the surveillance police activities. It is regarded as an elite force due to its stringent recruitment criteria of all armed forces. Due to increasing cross-border traffic of weapons and drugs, its activities have increased border areas. The national gendarmerie, unlike the Army or the National Guard, has never been directly involved in an attempt to seize or control power by force.

== Detention, pretrial and trial ==
Police detention period is limited to 48 hours without evidence. However, if police failed to gather sufficient evidence within the detention period, the prosecutor has the right to give the case to another officer subject to another 48 hours window. However, to start this procedure, the prosecutor must present compiling arguments to the judge. A defendant has the right to a lawyer immediately upon detention, and bail is available for crimes carrying a penalty of less than 10 years' imprisonment. The law generally requires that police conducting a search have a warrant, normally issued by a judge. Under the State Security Law, police may conduct searches without warrants when they have strong suspicion that a house shelters criminals or stolen property.

== Customary law in law enforcement in Niger ==
Traditional chiefs act as mediators and counselors and have authority in customary law cases as well as status under national law, where they were designated as auxiliaries to local officials. Customary courts, located only in large towns and cities, try cases involving divorce or inheritance. They are headed by a legal practitioner with basic legal training who is advised by an assessor knowledgeable in the society's traditions. The judicial actions of chiefs and customary courts are not regulated by law, and defendants can appeal a verdict to the formal court system.

== Shortcoming in law enforcement in Niger ==
Ignorance of the law and lack of financial means have been cited as some of the reasons for shortcomings in law enforcement in Niger. These shortcomings includes severe backlog in the judicial system due to lack of resources, lengthy pretrial detentions due to ignorance of the law and denial of rights. Despite legal limits to the pretrial detention, there have been reports of pretrial detention lasting many decades with reasonable arguments for reasons of charges charges.

Although the freedom of journalism is protected by the constitution and generally protected by institutions, security forces have been blamed to occasionally detain journalists and opposition politicians for political motives. Accusations of corruption are common particularly at police and gendarmerie roadblocks and checkpoints on urban roads as well as highways. The checkpoints are designed to check for papers, to collect tolls or internal tax on goods and to enforce laws and regulations.

In customary law, women generally are assessed by foreign observers as not having equal legal status with men in the traditional and customary courts and do not enjoy the same access to legal redress.
