= Mediator of the Republic =

The Mediator of the Republic of Niger is a government appointed position in the West African state of Niger. His or her role is to investigate and mediate national and communal disputes, and to advise the government on solutions.

On 18 August 2008, the government established a Mediator of the Republic. The mediator's role is to solve difficulties in the implementation and interpretation of laws and regulations. The president appoints the mediator, who is an independent administrative authority charged with investigating citizens' complaints and trying to find amicable solutions. The mediator has no decision-making powers, however, and instead submits results of investigations to the president and the prime minister.

Mamane Oumarou, who served as Prime Minister of Niger during the 1980s, was appointed as Mediator of the Republic on 19 August 2008.
