= Mano Dayak =

Nigerien freedom fighter and activist

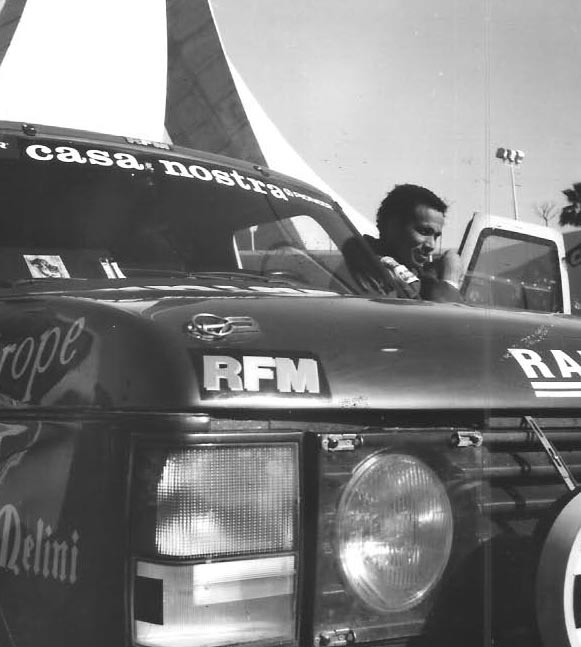
- Dayak in 1986

Head of the Temoust Liberation Front
- In office June 1993 – 15 December 1995
- Preceded by: Position established
- Succeeded by: Mohamed Akotey

Personal details
- Born: c. 1949 Aïr Mountains
- Died: 15 December 1995 Aïr Mountains
- Education: Indiana University Bloomington; Sorbonne University
- Occupation: Insurgent, activist, scholar, businessman, tour guide

Mano Dayak (1949 – December 15, 1995) was a famous Tuareg freedom fighter, leader, activist, scholar and negotiator. He led the Tuareg Rebellion in Ténéré region, northern Niger during the 1990s. He was born in the Tiden valley in the Aïr Mountains (nearby Agadez city) in 1949. He died in a plane crash in 1995, causing some speculation that it had not been accidental.

Early in life he went to Indiana University Bloomington, Indiana to study an undergraduate degree in folklore and later pursued a degree in political science at the Sorbonne University. It was here in France where he met his wife Odile, an anthropology student who planned to establish a tourist business with him in the early 1970s.

== Accomplishments and legacy ==
Besides leading the Tuareg rebellion (which he led from his base in the Adrar de Bouss), Mano Dayak made his name as the writer of several important books on Tuareg culture and politics. He also served as the guide of Thierry Sabine during the Paris–Dakar rally. The Tuareg band Tinariwen dedicated a song to him in their album "Aman Iman". Mano Dayak International Airport in Agadez is named after him.
