= Front for the Liberation of Aïr and Azaouak =

Front for the Liberation of Air and Azaouak
- Front de Liberation de l'Air et de l'Azaouak
- Leader: Rhissa Ag Boula
- Country: Niger

The Front for the Liberation of Air and Azaouak (French: Front de Liberation de l'Air et de l'Azaouak, acronymized as FLAA) was a rebel group that participated in two rebellions by the Tuareg people in the 1990s and the 2000s.

== Overview ==
In the autumn of 1991, the Tuareg rebellion escalated in Niger. The FLAA declared the attacks on administrative centers as a reaction to the events of Tchin Tabaraden. The Front for the Liberation of Air and Azaouak (FLAA) is a rebel group that participated in two rebellions by the Tuareg people in the 1990s and the 2000s. Its former leader is Rhissa Ag Boula who also created the Council of Resistance for the Republic in 2023.

== See also ==
- Tuareg people
- Tuareg rebellion (1990–1995)
- Tuareg rebellion (2007–2009)
- Rhissa Ag Boula
- Council of Resistance for the Republic
