= PUMA M26-15 =

Light tactical military vehicle

OTT Puma M26-15
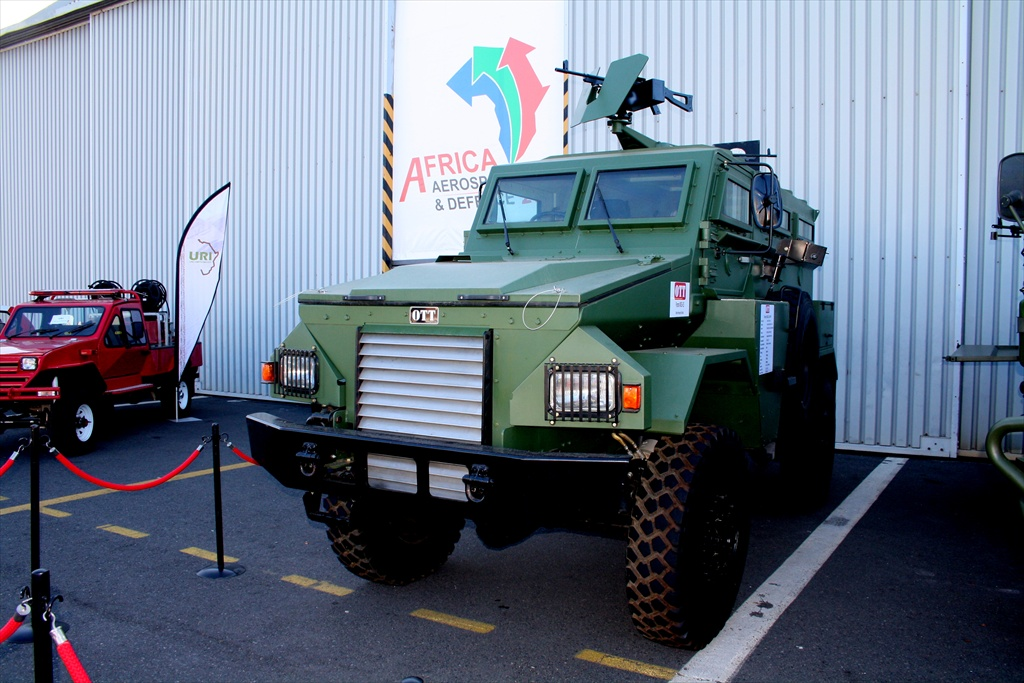
- OTT Puma M26-15
- Type: MRAP
- Place of origin: South Africa

Service history
- Used by: See Users

Production history
- Manufacturer: OTT Technologies

The Puma M26-15 4x4 is an armored personnel carrier (APC) with mine and improvised explosive device (IED) protection. The main users are military, police and security companies during peacekeeping operations. The Puma M26 was designed by OTT Technologies, a South African firm linked to DynCorp International. It is manufactured in South Africa and Mozambique.

== History ==
OTT Armoured Vehicles, a business unit of OTT Technologies (Pty) Ltd, first developed the Puma M26-15 as a cost-effective medium mine-protected vehicle. The M26-15 is a continuation of the Puma 4x2 mine-protected vehicle, which was successfully deployed in Iraq.

== Design ==
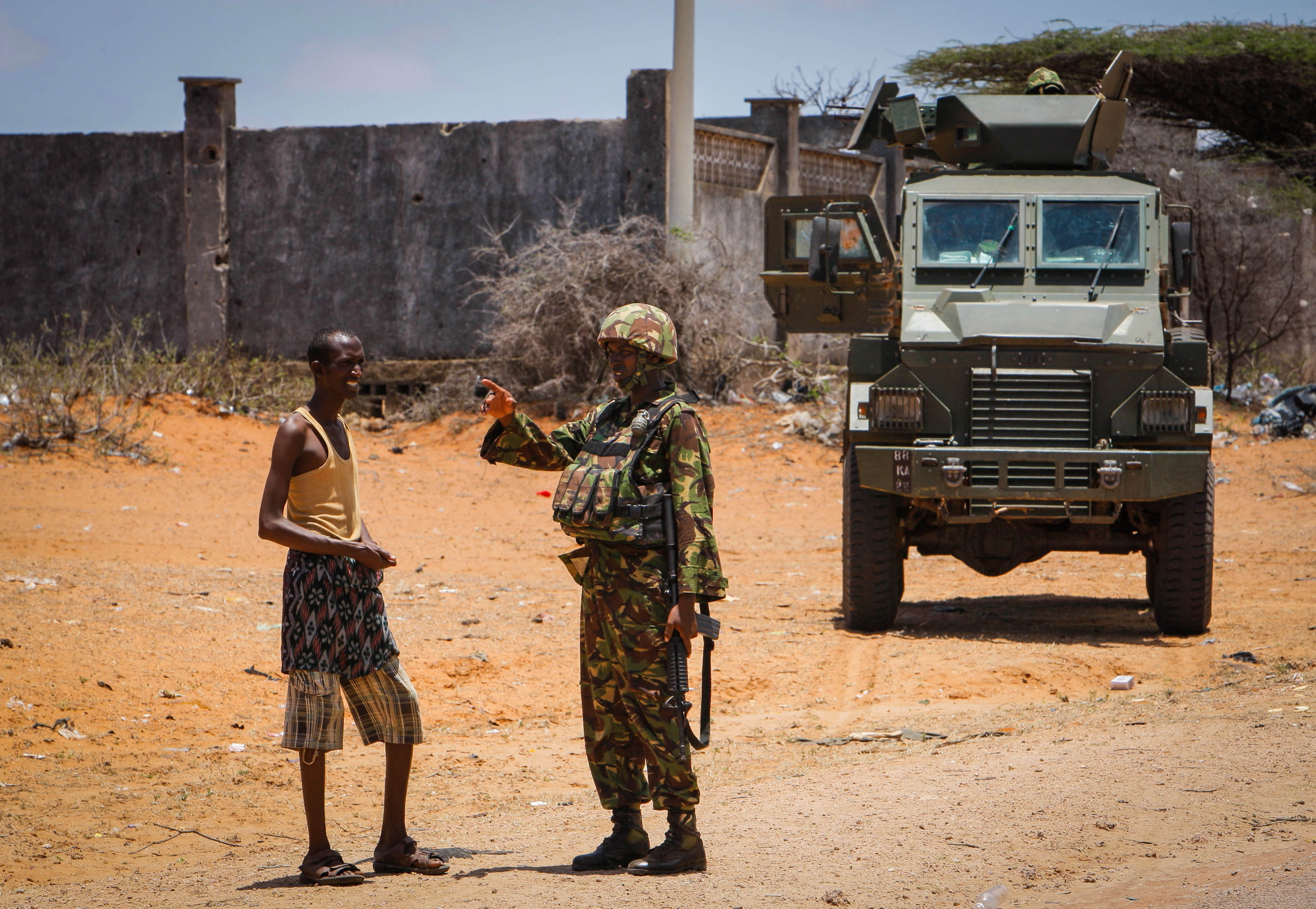
A Kenyan soldier speaks to a Somali with a PUMA M26-15 during an AMISOM operation.

The main design parameter was to develop a lower-cost and robust mine-protected vehicle without compromising crew safety and quality, a vehicle that can be deployed successfully and safely in the harsh environments of Africa and other developing regions. The M26-15 with a crew complement of ten (driver and commander plus eight) is a Tata 715TC 4x4 driveline, making it a robust and easy-to-maintain mine-protected vehicle with a low life-cycle cost.

The eight-ton GVM M26-15 has a sustained road speed of 80 km/h, double-lane change capability of 70 km/h, gradient of 60% and a side-slope capability of more than 25°. Wide windows ensure a good situational awareness, The vehicle also has eleven shooting ports, two roof hatches and a 360° cupola with a pintle mount for a light machine gun.

Dynamic automotive tests were successfully completed at the internationally renowned Gerotek vehicle test track outside Pretoria.

== Variants ==
=== PUMA M36 Mk 5 ===
A 6x6 variant unveiled at the Africa Aerospace and Defense 2016 convention, they consist of an APC and armored recovery variant. There are plans to market more variants such as an ambulance, command post and fire support vehicle armed with a 60mm or 81mm mortar. It has two persons, commander and driver, seated in front while 10 at the rear, five seated at each side facing inward on blast-attenuating seats.

It uses the chassis of the Ashok Leyland Stallion.

== Scandal ==
OTT Technologies were accused in March 2014 of breaking customs, tax, and controlled goods laws in Mozambique while attempting to export South African built Puma M26-15 vehicles through the port of Maputo. Mozambican tax authorities impounded 16 Puma M36-MRAPS at the port of Maputo and OTT Technologies’ facility outside of Maputo until the completion of a multi-ministerial investigation into tax and arms control irregularities is complete.

After a thorough investigation by the Mozambique Tax Authority and related departments, all allegations against OTT Technologies were withdrawn, and the 16 vehicles were unconditionally released for return to South Africa. The vehicles returned to South Africa in September 2016 and were shipped to West Africa shortly thereafter to commence in the peacekeeping operations that they were originally destined for.

== Users ==
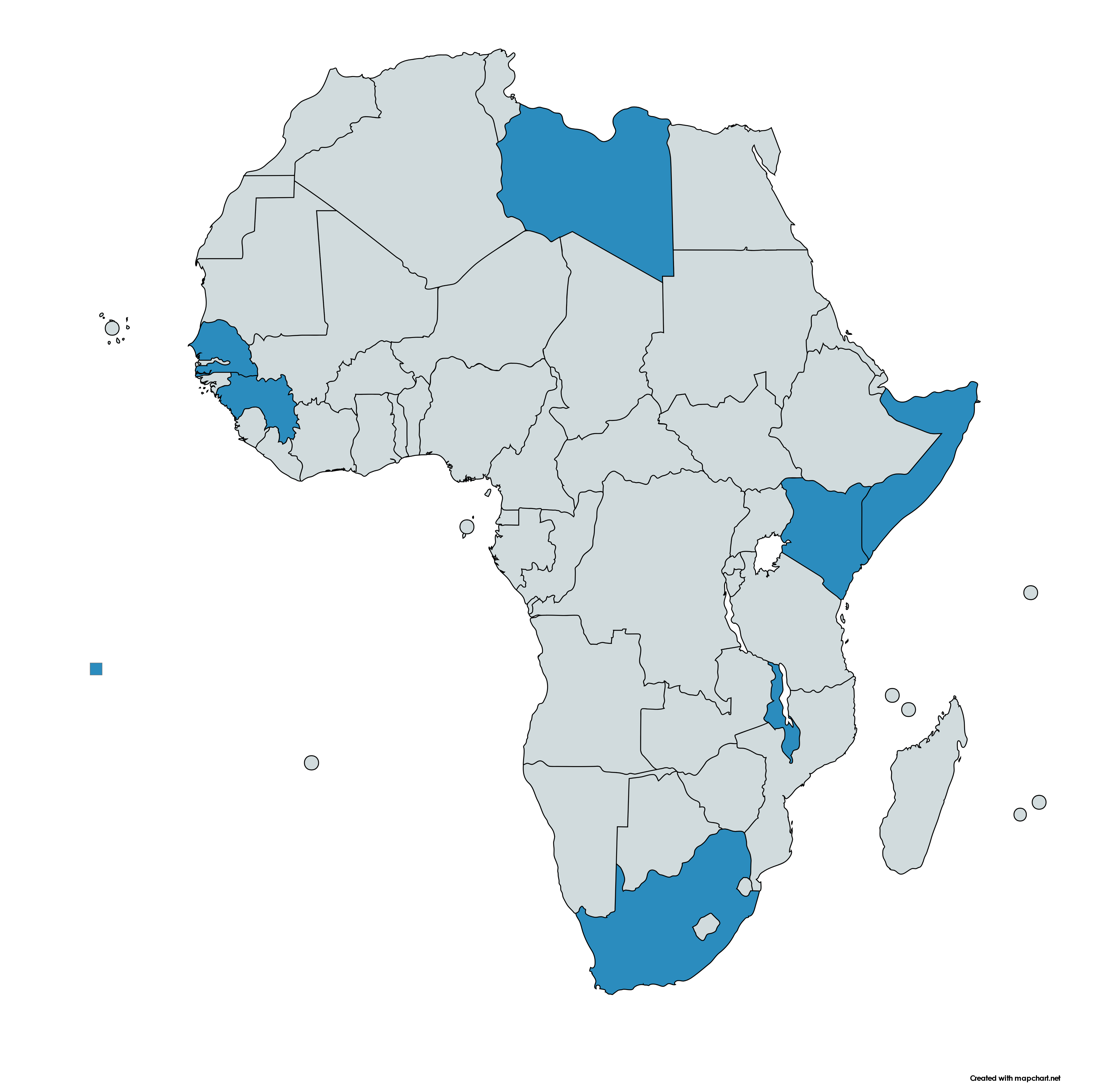
Map with PUMA M26 operators in blue

- Burkina Faso: 31 M26s
- Guinea: 32 M26s acquired in 2014.
- Kenya: 150 M26s used in Somalia. OTT has a workshop established in Nairobi under a contract to help the Kenyans repair the M26s.
- Libya: Acquired M26s.
- Malawi: In 2013, 13 M26s delivered to Malawi.
- Senegal: In 2014, 30 M26s delivered to Senegal which also included armored recovery vehicles.
- Somalia: 6 M26s donated by the US in 2021.

== Notes ==
- Manufacturers website
- PUMA brochure
