= Niger Armed Forces =

Combined military forces of Niger

- Rundunar Tsaron Nijar (Hausa)
- Seal of the Niger Armed Forces

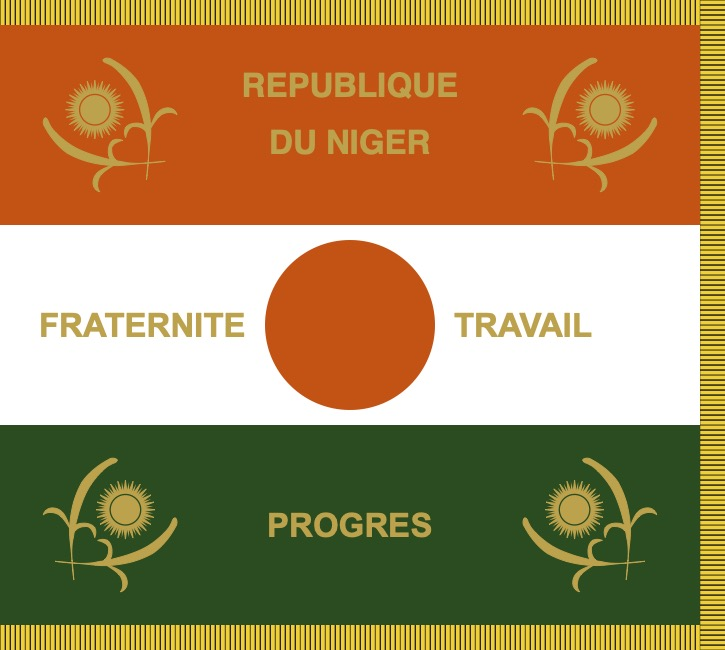
- Flag of the armed forces
- Founded: 1 August 1961; 65 years ago
- Service branches: Army; Air Force; National Gendarmerie; National Guard
- Headquarters: Niamey

Leadership
- Commander-in-chief: General Abdourahamane Tiani
- Prime Minister: Ali Lamine Zeine
- Minister of National Defence: Salifou Mody
- Chief of Staff: Brigadier General Moussa Salaou Barmou

Personnel
- Conscription: 2-year compulsory

Expenditure
- Budget: US$33.3 million (2004)
- Percent of GDP: 1.8% (2017 est.)

Industry
- Foreign suppliers: Modern: Brazil China Czech Republic Hungary Indonesia Israel Poland Russia South Africa Turkey Vietnam; Historical: France Germany Ukraine United States

Related articles
- History: Tuareg rebellion (1990–1995); Tuareg rebellion (2007–2009); United Nations Operation in Côte d'Ivoire; Boko Haram insurgency Islamist insurgency in the Sahel; Jihadist insurgency in Niger; 2023 Nigerien coup d'état Nigerien crisis
- Ranks: Military ranks of Niger

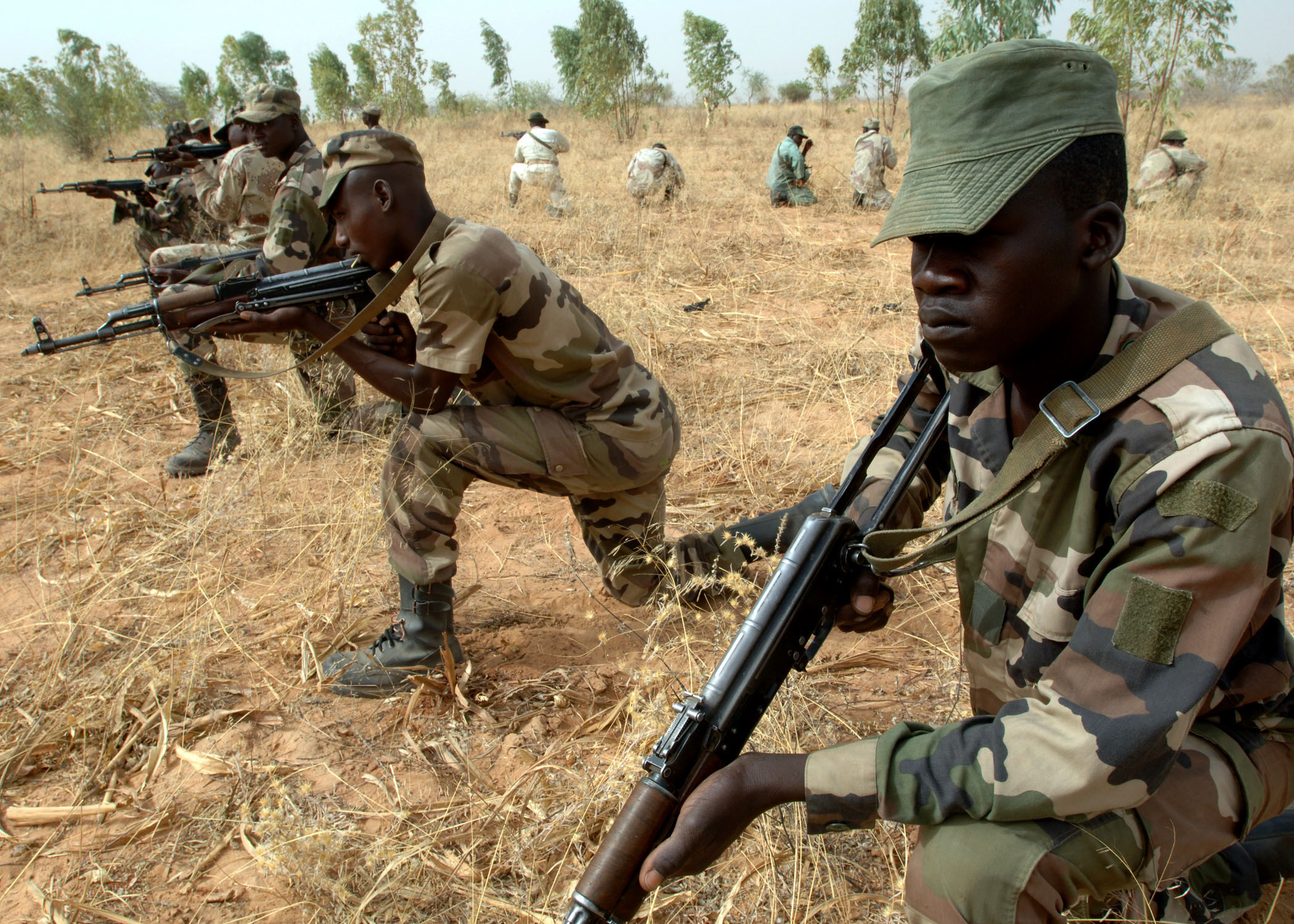
Soldiers from the 322nd Parachute Regiment practice field tactics with the U.S. Army, 2007

The Niger Armed Forces (Hausa: Rundunar Tsaron Nijar, RTN) includes military armed force service branches (Niger Army and Niger Air Force), paramilitary services branches (National Gendarmerie of Niger and National Guard of Niger) and the National Police of Niger. The Army, Air Force and the National Gendarmerie are under the Ministry of Defense whereas the National Guard and the National Police fall under the command of the Ministry of Interior. With the exception of the National Police, all military and paramilitary forces are trained in military fashion.

The President of Niger is the supreme commander of the entire armed forces. The National Assembly of Niger passed a statute for the Army of Niger in November 2020, planning for the army's size to increase from 25,000 personnel in 2020, to 50,000 in 2025 and finally 100,000 in 2030.

== Military armed forces ==
The two military service branches (Niger Army and Niger Air Force) are each headed by their respective Chiefs of Staff who serve as adjunct to the Joint Chiefs of Staff of Military Armed Forces (French: Chef d'État Major des Armées). Military operations are headed from the Joint Staff Office (French: État Major Général des Armées). In addition, each military branch has its own Staff Office. The Joint Chief of Staff has operational command of all the military forces and is under the command of civilian Minister of Defense, who reports to the President of Niger. This system closely resembles the French Armed forces model.

The President also appoints the Special Chief of Staff at the President Office and the head of the Presidential Guard who answer directly to the President. The Special Chief of Staff and the head of the Presidential Guard sit on the Joint Staff.

== Niger Army ==
The Niger Army, which includes 33,000 personnel as of 2023, is the land component of Niger's armed forces. Niger's special forces consists of two special operations companies and 9 intervention commando battalions. Niger Army's manoeuvre forces include 14 combined arms infantry battalions and a single amphibious riverine company. The Army also has one engineer company, one logistics group and one air defence company.

Each of the combined arms battalions comprises a logistics and engineering or génie company, a fire fighter company, an infantry company, be it airborne or land, an armoured squadron and an artillery company.

In 2006, the following combined arms battalions existed in the Niger Army: 12th, 13th, 22nd, 23rd, 24th, 32nd, 33rd, 42nd, 43rd, 52nd, 53rd, 62nd, 63rd, 72nd and 73rd. In addition, there was the Artillery Battalion of the Niger Armed Forces.

The Army is commanded by the Chief of Staff of the Army in Niamey through appointed commandeers of each of the nine "Defense Zones", which largely overlap each of the civilian Regions of Niger.

=== History ===
The Niger Army was created on 28 July 1960 by decree. At the time, the National Police was a subsection of the military. Initially, units of the army were created from three companies of the French Colonial Forces made of Nigérien soldiers officered by Frenchmen who agreed to take joint French-Nigerien citizenship. In 1960, there were only ten African officers in the Nigérien army, all of low ranks. As Nigérien officers gradually assumed command roles, President Hamani Diori signed legislation to end the employment of expatriate military officers in 1965. However, French military personnel remained in Niger both to serve in the Niger Army and in the 4^{e} Régiment Interarmes d'Outre-Mer (Troupes de Marine) with bases at Niamey, Zinder, Bilaro and Agadez. In the late 1970s, a smaller French force returned again to Niger. After the 1974 military coup, all French military personnel were evacuated although a smaller French force returned in the late 1970s.

In 1970, the army was reorganised and divided into four Infantry battalions, one paratroop company, one light armored company, a camel corps, and a number of support units. It was reorganized in 2003 to create the Niger Air Force as a distinct service branch.

=== Training ===
Basic training is carried out at Niamey at the Tondibiah base and at Agadez. Other special training centers include the National Officers Training School (French: École de Formation des Forces Armées Nigériennes or EFOFAN) and The Paramedical Personnel Training School (EPPAN) both based at the Tondibiah base. In addition to training in Niger, army officers also train in France at the École spéciale militaire de Saint-Cyr, in Morocco at the Royal Military Academy of Meknès, in Algeria and the US. With the growing cross-border threats of terrorism in West Africa, the Niger Army has benefited from training exercises with France and the U.S. The Niger Army has participated in the U.S. led Flintlock Exercise which it hosted in 2014.

=== Equipment ===
The army of Niger is poorly equipped with armored vehicles and tanks. With the exception of two armored vehicles purchased from China in 2009, most armoured vehicles are at least 20 years old. The army is however well-stocked with 4 × 4 Toyota Land Cruisers mounted with various caliber machine guns. Logistically, fuel and water transportation tanks, and ambulances have been recently improved to help in long-distance patrol missions as well as with general increased logistic capacity of the army.

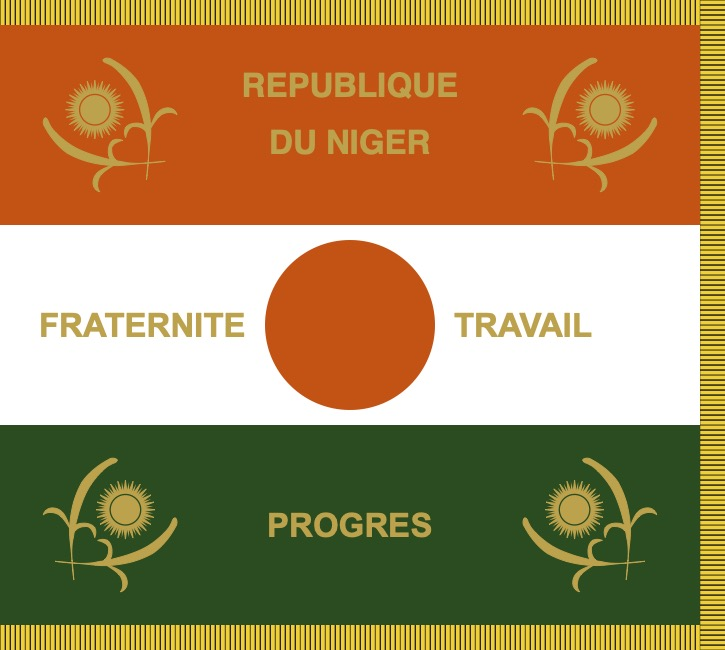
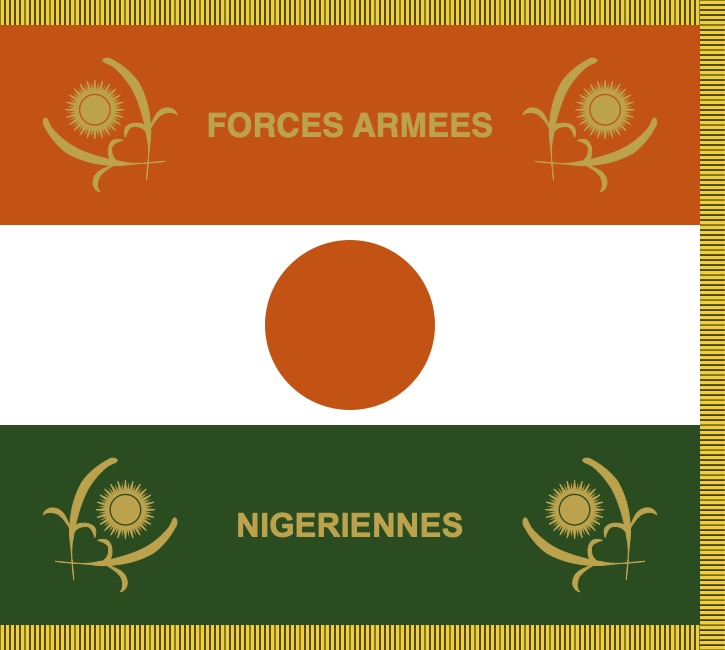
Flag of the Niger Armed Forces (Note: The reverse side of the Flag of the Niger Armed Force:)

=== Armor ===
Name	Origin	Type	In service	Notes
Armored fighting vehicle
ZFB-05	China	Armoured personnel carrier	8	
WZ-523	China	Armoured personnel carrier	2	
UR-416	West Germany	Armoured personnel carrier	8	
Mamba Mk7	South Africa	Armoured personnel carrier	35	
PUMA M26-15	South Africa	Armoured personnel carrier	11	
Panhard VBL	France	Armored car	7	
AML 60/90	France	Armored car	125	
Panhard M3	France	Armoured personnel carrier	32	
BRDM-2	Soviet Union	Amphibious armoured car	30	
Nurol Ejder	Turkey	Mine-resistant ambush protected	24 (1 captured)	On order.

== Air Force ==
=== Aircraft ===
Model	Image	Origin	Quantity	Details
ATK
Su-25 Frogfoot		USSR	2	
ISR
Cessna 208 Caravan		United States	~2	
DA42 MPP Twin Star		Austria	~1	
TPT • Medium
C-130H Hercules		United States	3	
TPT • Light
An-26 Curl		USSR	1	
Cessna 208 Caravan		United States	2	
Do-28 Skyservant		Germany	1	
Do228-201		Germany	1	
PAX
B-737-700		United States	1	(VIP).
TRG
Hurkus-C		Turkiye	~2	

=== History ===
The predecessor of the Niger Air Force, the Niger National Escadrille (Escadrille Nationale du Niger) was first formed in 1961. It was later restructured into the National Air Wing (Groupement Aérien National) in 1989. Prior to 2003, the armed forces of Niger (French: Forces armées nigériennes or FAN) were grouped in one branch with one Chief of Staff overseeing both the ground forces and the National Air Wing. Following an organizational restructuring in 2003, the armed forces of Niger were structured into two main service branches: Niger Army (French: armée de terre) for all ground forces and Niger Air Force (Armée de l'air). Each branch was headed by a Chief of Staff answerable to the Joint Chief of Staff of military armed forces. As part of this new structure, the National Air Wing was renamed as Niger Air Force (Force Aérienne du Niger) on December 17, 2003. The Niger Air Force is led by the Air Force Chief of staff, answerable to the Joint Chief and the Defense Minister.

=== Structure ===
Organizationally, the air force is composed a Chief of Staff Office, operation units (French: escadrons), technical units, an infantry company (compagnie de fusilliers) and generalized staff. The Chief of Staff of the Niger Air Force is the colonel Abdoul Kader Amirou (chef d'état major).

=== Training ===
At the moment, there is no air force special training facilities in Niger. Basic training of Air Force recruits is conducted at the Tondibiah base along with recruits of other military service branches. Air force officers, pilots and mechanics are additionally trained in France, the United States and other North African countries like Morocco at the Royal Air Force School of Marrakech and Algeria. In addition, local training activities are undertaken with foreign partners (United States, France etc.) to update skills. In 2014, a logistic company was trained and equipped by the United States with fuel and water trucks, ambulances and 4 × 4 unarmed vehicles.

The United States Air Force has a presence both at Nigerien Air Base 101 near Niamey and Nigerien Air Base 201 at Agadez.

=== Aircraft inventory ===
The aircraft inventory of the Niger Air Force is modest though it has increased with new acquisitions beginning in 2008, and further assistance from France and the United States. This expansion in capacity is guided by the need for better border patrol following the crisis in Libya and Mali.

Roundel of the Niger Air Force

Aircraft	Origin	Type	Variant	In service	Notes
Combat aircraft
Sukhoi Su-25	Soviet Union	Attack		2	
Transport
Dornier 228	Germany	Transport		1	
Cessna 208	United States	Utility		4	2 units are used for reconnaissance
Beechcraft Super King Air	United States	Transport	350	1	
Lockheed C-130 Hercules	United States	Transport	C-130H	3	
Helicopters
Bell 412	Italy	Transport / SAR	AB-412	4	
Mil Mi-17	Russia	Transport		4	2 Mi-171 donated by Algeria in 2026
Mil Mi-24	Russia	Attack	Mi-35	1	2 on order as of 2024
Mil Mi-24	South Africa	Attack	SuperHind Mk.III	2	Donated by Algeria in 2026
Aérospatiale Gazelle	France	Scout / Anti-armor	SA342	5	
Trainer aircraft
TAI Hürkuş	Turkey	Basic trainer	B	2	
Unmanned aerial vehicle
Vestel Karayel	Turkey	UCAV		.	5 on order
Bayraktar TB2	Turkey	UCAV		6	-

== Paramilitary forces ==
There are two paramilitary services branches: (National Gendarmerie of Niger under the Ministry of Defense and the National Guard of Niger) under the Ministry of Interior. Each of these branches are headed by Chief of Staff answerable to the overseeing ministry.

=== National Gendarmerie ===
The National Gendarmerie is commanded by the Superior Commander of the National Gendarmerie. Unlike the National Police and the National Guard, the National Gendarmerie is under the control of the Ministry of Defense of Niger. It is divided between territorial brigades and mobile brigades. In addition to territorial defense and maintaining public order, it provides military and paramilitary justice to other corps of the armed forces and participates to the judicial and the surveillance police activities. It is regarded as an elite force due to its stringent recruitment criteria of all armed forces. Due to increasing cross-border traffic of weapons and drugs, its activities have increased border areas. The national gendarmerie, unlike the Army or the National Guard, has never been directly involved in an attempt to seize or control power by force.

=== National Guard ===
Formerly known as the National Forces of Intervention and Security, the National Guard of Niger is responsible for security in rural areas where the national police is absent. It is overseen by the superior commander of the National Guard who reports to the Ministry of Interior. This body is responsible for: border and territorial surveillance of the country, public safety, maintaining and restoring of order, protecting public buildings and institutions, people and their property, the execution of the administrative police in rural and pastoral areas, management and monitoring of prisons, humanitarian actions in the case of national disaster or crisis and protection of the environment. It is also responsible for providing security to administrative authorities and the diplomatic and consular representations of Niger abroad.

== National Police ==
The General Directorate of National Police, headquartered in Niamey was until the 1999 Constitution under the command of the Armed Forces and Ministry of Defense. Today, only the National Gendarmerie reports to the Ministry of Defense, with the National Police and its Para-Military Arm—FNIS—moved to the Nigérien Interior Ministry. The National Gendarmerie (modeled on the French Gendarmerie) and the National Forces for Intervention and Security (FNIS) (Forces nigérienne d'intervention et de sécurité – FNIS) count a combined 3,700 member paramilitary police force. The FNIS, along with some special units of the Gendarmerie, are armed and trained in military fashion, similar to the Internal Troops of the nations of the former Soviet Union. The Gendarmerie has law enforcement jurisdiction outside the Urban Communes of Niger, while the National police patrols towns. Special internal security operations may be carried out by the Military, the FNIS, the Gendarmerie, or whatever forces tasked by the Government of Niger.

== Domestic conflicts ==
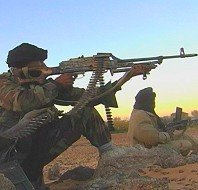
Member of the rebel MNJ, northern Niger, 2008

=== The First Tuareg Rebellion of 1985–1995 ===
From 1985 to 1995, the armed forces of Niger were engaged in armed fights with the Popular Front for the Liberation of Niger (FPLN). An armed attack by FPLN members in Tchin – Tabaradene in 1985 sparked the closing of the borders with Libya and Algeria, and the resettlement of thousands of Tuareg and other nomads away from the area. Failed promises by the government of Ali Saïbou fueled growing Tuareg discontent leading to an attack on a police station in Tchin – Tabaradene in May 1990. The Niger Army violently responded in May 1990, arresting, torturing, and killing several hundred Tuareg civilians in Tchin – Tabaradene, Gharo and In-Gall in what is known as the Tchin – Tabaradene massacre. Tuareg outrage sparked the creation of two armed insurgent groups: the Front for the Liberation of Aïr and Azaouak and the Front for the Liberation of Tamoust and continued armed fights until 1995 when a peace agreement end fighting. The Nigérien Armed Forces has been extensively involved in politics since independence, and has been denounced at several points for broad abrogation of human rights and unlawful detentions and killings.

=== The Second Tuareg Rebellion of 2007–2009 ===
The Nigerien Armed Forces were involved from 2007 to 2009 in an insurgency in the north of the country, labeled the Second Tuareg Rebellion. A previously unknown group, the Mouvement des Nigériens pour la Justice (MNJ), emerged in February 2007. The predominantly Tuareg group has issued a number of demands, mainly related to development in the north. It has attacked military and other facilities and laid landmines in the north. The resulting insecurity has devastated Niger's tourist industry and deterred investment in mining and oil. The government has labeled the MNJ criminals and traffickers, and refuses to negotiate with the group until it disarms. As of July 2008, some 100 to 160 Nigérien troops have been killed in the ongoing conflict. The second tuareg rebellion ended in 2009 with Peace Talks hosted by Libya.

=== Jihadist insurgency in Niger ===
On 10 December 2019, a large group of fighters belonging to the Islamic State in the Greater Sahara (IS-GS) attacked a military post in Inates, Niger, killing over seventy soldiers and kidnapping others. The attack was the deadliest single incident Niger's military has ever experienced.

On 9 January 2020, a large group of IS-GS militants assaulted a Nigerien military base at Chinagodrar, in Niger's Tillabéri Region. At least 89 Nigerien soldiers were confirmed to have been killed in the attack, with more casualties suspected, making it the worst attack on the army since the start of the insurgency.

== Foreign missions ==
In 1991, Niger sent a 400-man military contingent to join the American-led allied forces against Iraq during the Gulf War. Niger provides a battalion of peace-keeping forces to the UN Mission in Ivory Coast. As of 2003, the FAN had troops deployed in the following foreign missions:

- ECOMOG: Liberia, Guinée-Bissau;
- African Union: Burundi (MIOB), Comoros (MIOC), Mali (AFISMA);
- United Nations: Rwanda (MINURCA), Democratic Republic of Congo (MONUC); Mali (MINUSMA)

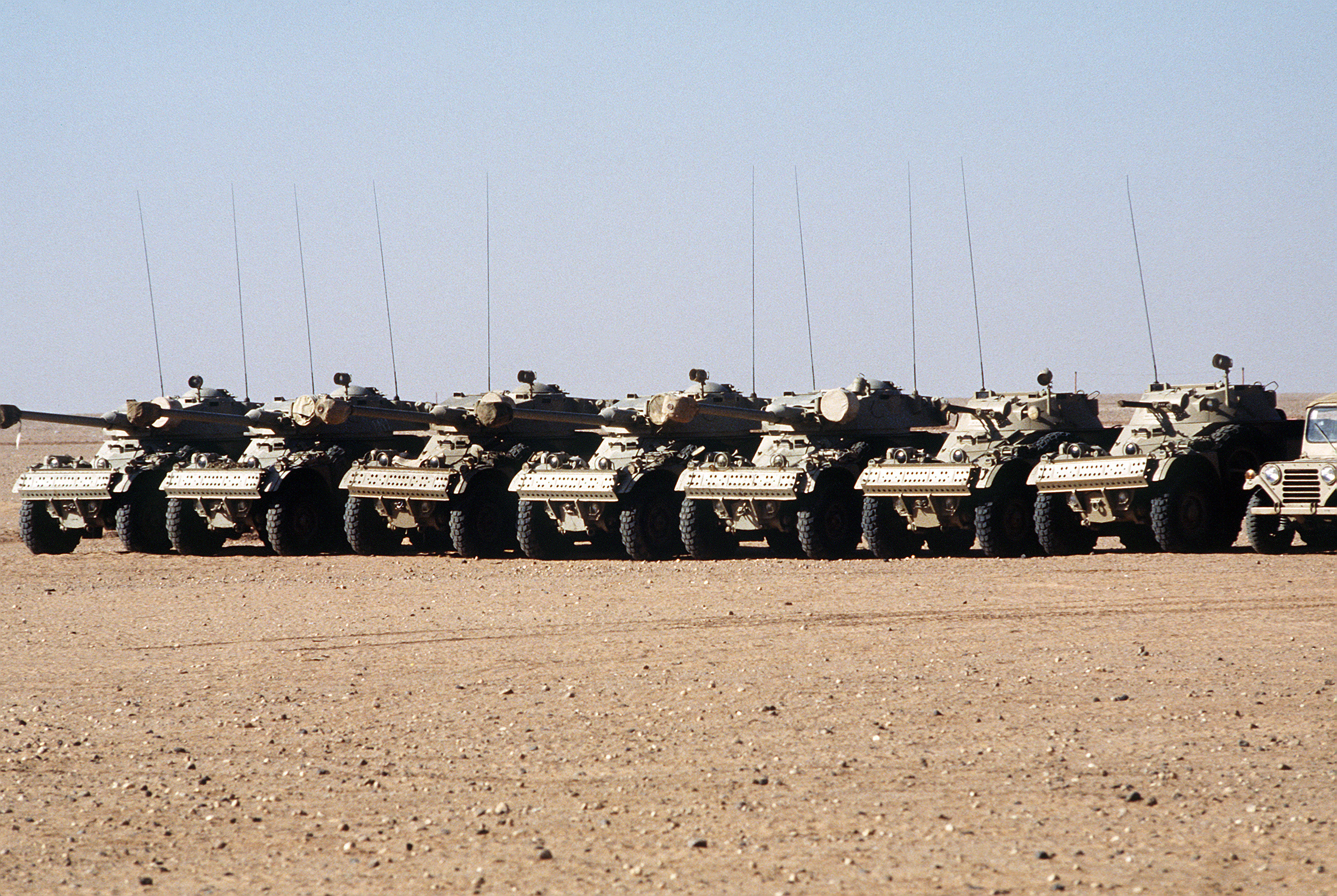
Nigerien Panhard AML light armored cars with 90mm guns stand in a holding area during Operation Desert Shield.

== Defense cooperation ==
Niger defense forces have a long history of military cooperation with neighboring countries in the region, France, the United States, China as well as many other countries.

=== Regional defense cooperation ===
Through ECOWAS and the African Union, Niger defense forces have been involved in multiple missions in the Africa and the West Africa. Niger has been a supporter and volunteered to participate in the African Union future rapid intervention forces. In addition, with the growing threat of Boko Haram, defense forces of Niger, Nigeria, Cameroon and Chad have intensified cooperation to address the trans-border threat of this organization.

=== Counter-terrorism defense cooperation ===
U.S. and France defense cooperation with Niger has intensified post 9/11 as part of the Global War on Terror. The Niger defense forces along with forces from Chad, Mali, Mauritania have become major partners of France and the United States in counter-terrorism efforts in Africa. The counter-terrorism efforts focused mainly on Al-Qaïda affiliated groups in Africa, in particular the Algerian Group for Call and Combat which will later become AQMI. The collapse of the Gaddafi regime, followed with the disbandment of his arsenal in the region, accentuated the precarious situation of many sahelian nations. The Northern Mali conflict and beginning of Operation Serval to free northern Mali of Islamic militant groups solidified the role of Niger in counter-terrorism activities in the region. Following an agreement with the Niger government, the air force base 101 of Niamey became a permanent drone hub for French and U.S. forces since 2013. Drone intelligence gathering activities in Mali and the region were carried out from this base during Serval. Niamey has become the Intelligence gathering pole of French and U.S. forces in the region.

In March 2024, Niger announced it was ending its security relationship with the United States, which had been in place since 2012. According to Niger, the security pact violated Niger's constitution. In a report issued by United States member of Congress Matt Gaetz the following month, Gaetz stated that the United States embassy in Niger was suppressing information related to the decay of Niger-United States diplomatic relations. According to Gaetz's report, Niger has not authorized flights for United States Department of Defense efforts, including the sending of food, equipment, mail, or medical supplies.

== Political involvement ==
In 1974 General Seyni Kountché overthrew the first president of Niger Hamani Diori. The military regime that followed, while plagued by coup attempts of its own, survived until 1991. While a period of relative prosperity, the military government of the period allowed little free expression and engaged in arbitrary imprisonment and killing.

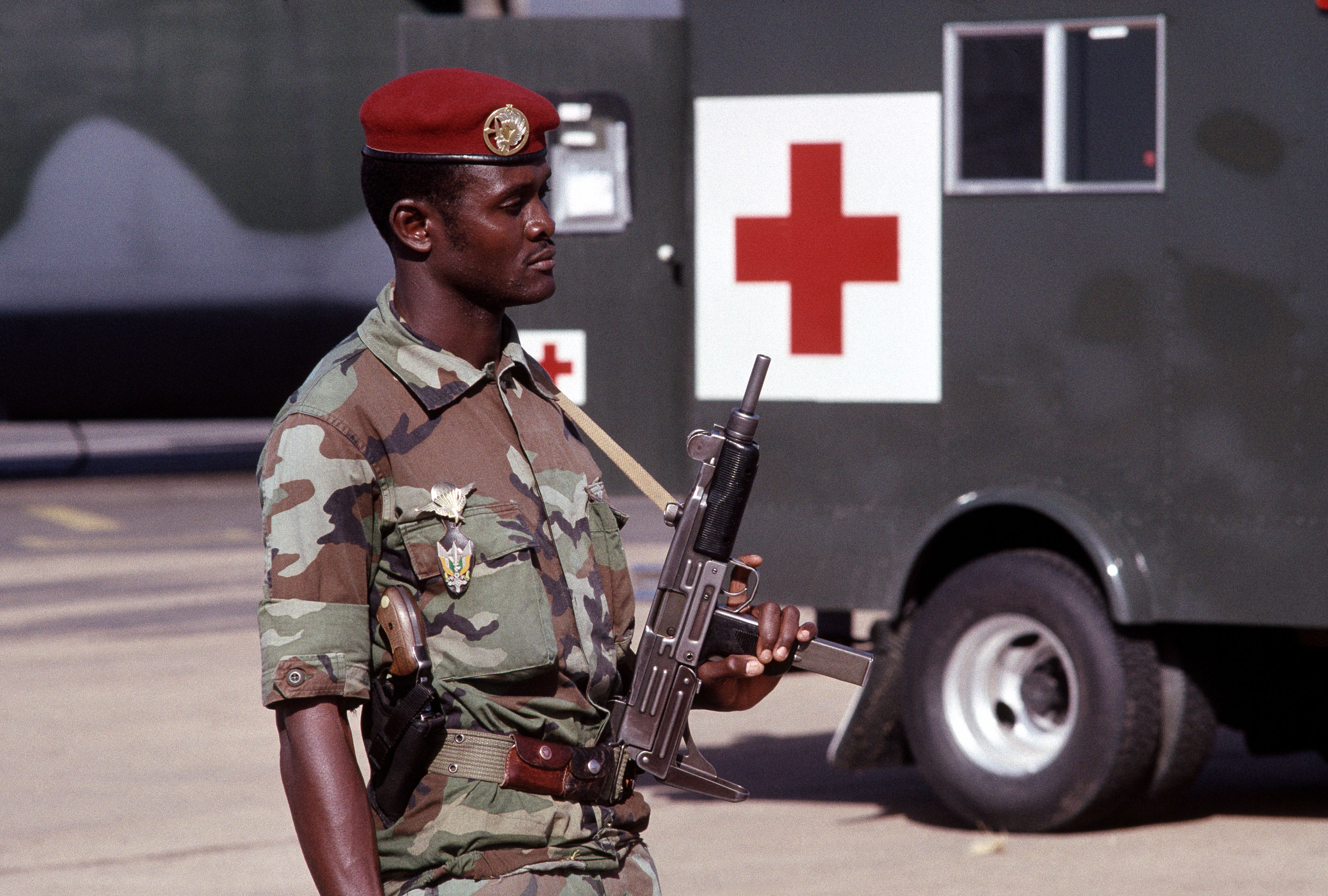
A paratrooper of the FAN Parachute Company armed with an Israeli-made Uzi submachine gun, 1988

In 1996, a former officer under Kountché and the then chief of staff, Ibrahim Baré Maïnassara, staged his own coup, placing the military again in power. During the Maïnassara regime, human rights abuses were reported by foreign NGOs, including the discovery of 150 dead bodies in a mass grave at Boultoungoure, thought to be Toubou rebels. In April 1999, the third coup led by Douada Mallam Wanké was staged leading to murder of President Baré by his own guards. To date, the authors this crime have been prosecuted. Major Daouda Mallam Wanke, commander of the Niamey-based military region and the head of the Republican Guard assumed power, but returned the nation to civilian rule within the year. The military regime of Douada Mallam Wanké ended with the election of Mamadou Tandja in 1999 who deposed ten years later by another military coup, the fourth in the history of the country.

== Cultural sponsorships ==
The Army, National Guard and the National Police sponsor semi-professional football clubs, ASFAN, AS-FNIS and AS Police, which play in the Niger Premier League.

== Professionalisation ==
The Armed Forces—which includes the National Gendarmerie—have undergone a series of structural changes aimed at professionalisation of the ranks and the retaining of more skilled recruits. Greater emphasis on recruiting officers and NCOs, lessening recruitment of lower ranks, and more training required between promotions have been instituted. Annual recruitment for the Army and the Gendarmerie now stands at one thousand each.

== Budget and foreign aid ==
Niger's defense budget is modest, accounting for about 1.6% of government expenditures. France provides the largest share of military assistance to Niger. The People's Republic of China also provide military assistance. Approximately 18 French military advisers are in Niger. Many Nigérien military personnel receive training in France, and the Nigerien Armed Forces are equipped mainly with material either given by or purchased in France. United States assistance has focused on training pilots and aviation support personnel, professional military education for staff officers, and initial specialty training for junior officers. A small foreign military assistance program was initiated in 1983 and a U.S. Defense Attaché office opened in June 1985. After being converted to a Security Assistance Office in 1987, it was subsequently closed in 1996, following a coup d'état. A U.S. Defense Attaché office reopened in July 2000.

The United States provided transportation and logistical assistance to Nigerien troops deployed to Ivory Coast in 2003.

Additionally, the US provided initial equipment training on vehicles and communications gear to a company of Nigerien soldiers as part of the Department of State Pan Sahel Initiative. Military to military cooperation continues via the Trans-Saharan Counter Terrorism Partnership and other initiatives. EUCOM contributes funds for humanitarian assistance construction throughout the country. In 2007, a congressional waiver was granted which allows the Niger military to participate in the International Military Education and Training (IMET) program, managed by the Security Cooperation Office. This program funded $170,000 in training in 2007.
