= 1993 Nigerien parliamentary election =

Parliamentary elections were held in Niger on 14 February 1993. They were the first multi-party elections in the country since independence in 1960, and followed constitutional changes approved in a referendum the previous year. Although the ruling National Movement for the Society of Development won the most seats (29 of the 83), several opposition parties formed the Alliance of the Forces of Change following the elections, between them controlling 50 seats. Voter turnout was just 32.7%.

== Electoral system ==
Members of the National Assembly were elected by two methods; 75 were elected from eight multi-member districts based on the seven regions and Niamey using party-list proportional representation, with seats allocated using the Hare quota and largest remainder method. A further eight members representing national minorities were elected in single-member constituencies based on the regions using first-past-the-post voting.

== Results ==
| Party | Votes | % | Seats | +/– |
|---|---|---|---|---|
| National Movement for the Society of Development | 383,921 | 30.65 | 29 | –64 |
| Democratic and Social Convention | 341,849 | 27.29 | 22 | New |
| Nigerien Alliance for Democracy and Progress | 193,967 | 15.48 | 11 | New |
| Nigerien Party for Democracy and Socialism | 183,150 | 14.62 | 13 | New |
| Sawaba | 39,271 | 3.13 | 2 | New |
| Union of Democratic and Progressive Patriots | 36,203 | 2.89 | 2 | New |
| Nigerien Progressive Party – African Democratic Rally | 32,615 | 2.60 | 2 | New |
| Party for Socialism and Democracy in Niger | 18,661 | 1.49 | 1 | New |
| Party of the Masses for Labour | 15,446 | 1.23 | 0 | New |
| Movement for Democracy and Progress | 5,967 | 0.48 | 0 | New |
| Party for National Unity and Development | 1,153 | 0.09 | 0 | New |
| Union for Democracy and Social Progress | 463 | 0.04 | 1 | New |
| Total | 1,252,666 | 100.00 | 83 | –10 |
| Valid votes | 1,252,666 | 95.76 | | |
| Invalid/blank votes | 55,429 | 4.24 | | |
| Total votes | 1,308,095 | 100.00 | | |
| Registered voters/turnout | 3,996,213 | 32.73 | | |
Source: Election Passport

=== Results by region ===
| Party | Agadez | Diffa | Dosso | Maradi | Niamey | Tahoua | Tillabéri | Zinder |
|---|---|---|---|---|---|---|---|---|
| National Movement for the Society of Development | 3 | 3 | 2 | 3 | 2 | 5 | 9 | 2 |
| Democratic and Social Convention | 1 | 0 | 2 | 5 | 1 | 3 | 1 | 9 |
| Nigerien Alliance for Democracy and Progress | 0 | 0 | 4 | 1 | 1 | 1 | 4 | 0 |
| Nigerien Party for Democracy and Socialism | 1 | 1 | 1 | 2 | 0 | 5 | 1 | 2 |
| Others | 0 | 1 | 1 | 3 | 0 | 0 | 1 | 2 |
| Total | 5 | 5 | 10 | 14 | 4 | 14 | 16 | 15 |
Source: Election Passport

== Aftermath ==
Following the elections, the Democratic and Social Convention, the Nigerien Alliance for Democracy and Progress, the Nigerien Party for Democracy and Socialism, the Nigerien Progressive Party – African Democratic Rally, the Party for Socialism and Democracy in Niger and the Union for Democracy and Social Progress all joined the Alliance of the Forces of Change.
