= Abdou Harouna Assoumane =

Governor of Niamey Region
- Incumbent
- Assumed office August 1, 2023
- Preceded by: Oudou Ambouka

Personal details
- Party: CNSP (2023-present)

Military service
- Branch/service: Nigerien Armed Forces
- Rank: Major general
- Battles/wars: Boko Haram insurgency

Abdou Harouna Assoumane is a Nigerien soldier and politician who has served as Governor of Niamey since August 2023.

== Biography ==
Assoumane was promoted to lieutenant in 2021 while serving in the Nigerien Armed Forces. On October 2, 2021, he was the deputy commander of the Multinational Joint Task Force (MNJTF), where he fought against Boko Haram in Niger and northern Nigeria. He was a brigadier general by 2021. He took part in an operation to kill 30 Boko Haram militants in April 2022. In September 2022, he was succeeded in this position by Assaoulai Blama.

On August 1, 2023, Assoumane was appointed by Abdourahamane Tiani as the Governor of Niamey after the 2023 Nigerien coup d'état. He met with Nigerien and Niamey city officials on August 9, including outgoing governor Oudou Ambouka. At a meeting on August 16, he criticized ECOWAS' sanctions on the putschists. In September 2023, Assoumane embarked on ambitious social programs that would take successful students and put them to work for the Nigerien government. This also included a mobilization for troops to fight against Jama'at Nusrat al-Islam wal-Muslimin (JNIM) and Islamic State - Sahel Province (ISSP) militants in nearby Tillaberi and Tahoua provinces. In November 2023, Assoumane met with Brah Reki Djermakoye, president of the Fund for the Safeguard of the Homeland.

In 2024, Assoumane bolstered electrical, telecommunications, and other critical infrastructure in and around Niamey in response to infrastructure attacks by Mahamoud Sallah's Patriotic Liberation Front. In February 2024, he pledged funds to build a Petit Market in Niamey. One of the main problems Assoumane sought to fix in the city was begging, which he said was occurring at an "alarming scale". Assoumane used National Guard and Gendarmerie troops to deport beggars outside of the city and ensure they did not return.

In November 2024, Assoumane established a Morality Brigade under the Niamey Regional Government, which was to arrest prostitutes, soliciting, public indecency, and other "offenses to morality." On February 15, 2025, Assoumane gave his "35 Years of Misunderstood Democracy", which had mixed reactions among the Nigerien public and political class. In the speech, he denounced corruption and inefficiency of current and past Nigerien administrations, "disintegration of the social fabric", and "petty politics and squabbles" driving the country into chaos.

In 2026, Assoumane installed a new bureau of traditional chiefs to bolster social cohesion, made up of 114 chiefs from different neighborhoods in the capital. He also launched an awareness campaign calling on outlying neighborhoods of the capital to be vigilant and protect against jihadists. Assoumane was behind the demolishing of neighborhoods close to Diori Hamani International Airport, which was attacked by the Islamic State in January 2026. The demolition displaced 26,000 people.
