= Maïna Boukar =

Governor of Tillaberi Region
- Incumbent
- Assumed office August 1, 2023
- Preceded by: Yaye Arouna

Personal details
- Party: CNSP (since 2023)

Military service
- Rank: Colonel
- Unit: Nigerien Armed Forces

Maïna Boukar is a Nigerien soldier currently serving as governor of Tillabéri Region since 2023.

== Biography ==
Little is known about Boukar's birthplace or date. He has an established career in the Nigerien Armed Forces, being promoted to colonel in January 2022.

On August 1, 2023, following the 2023 Nigerien coup d'état that brought the CNSP to power, Boukar was appointed governor of Tillabéri Region, replacing Yaye Arouna and giving a speech to local politicians and civil society leaders. At the time of his appointment, Boukar was a lieutenant colonel. On August 11, Boukar called on the people of Tillaberi to unify to eradicate insecurity in the region to renovate the country. Boukar oversaw an expansion of an irrigated farming campaign like other regions of Niger.
