= Volunteers for the Defense of Niger =

Civilian militia force in Niger

The Volunteers for the Defense of Niger (French: Volontaires pour la défense du Niger, VDN) is a civilian militia force to combat a potential military intervention by ECOWAS. It is on the side of Abdourahamane Tiani and the National Council for the Safeguard of the Homeland, the ruling military junta of Niger, during the 2023 Nigerien crisis.

== Formation ==
The junta announced the formation of the Volunteers for the Defense of Niger (VDN) on 19 August 2023. Recruitment for volunteers was expected to commence on 26 August in Niamey.

== See also ==
- National Council for the Safeguard of the Homeland
- 2023 Nigerien crisis
- 2023 Nigerien coup d'état
