= Sylvain Itté =

French diplomat

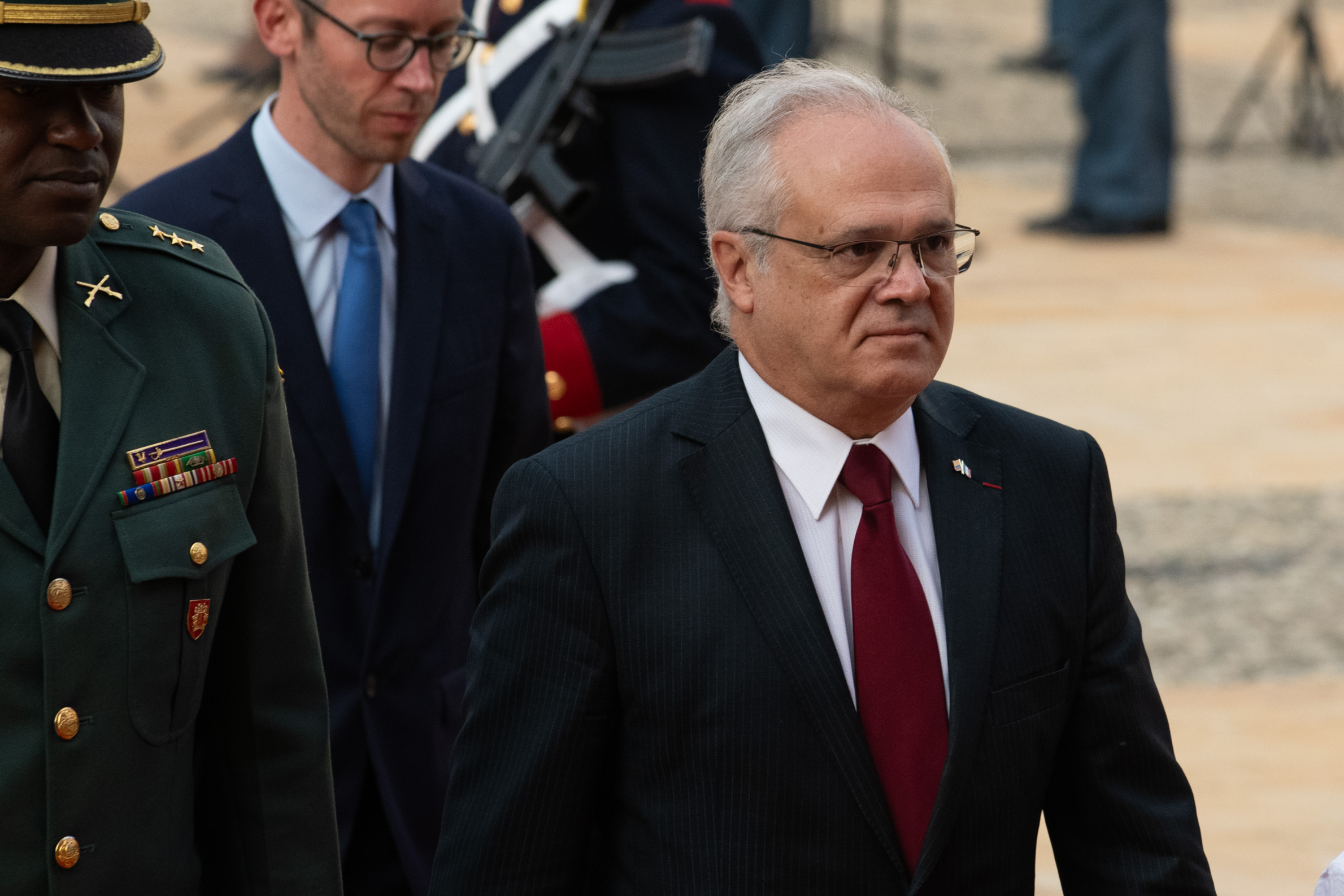
- Itté, 2024

French ambassador to Colombia
- Incumbent
- Assumed office 15 August 2024
- Preceded by: Frédéric Doré

French ambassador to Niger
- In office 28 September 2022 – 27 September 2023
- Preceded by: Alexandre Garcia
- Succeeded by: Position abolished

French ambassador to Angola
- In office 27 September 2016 – 12 October 2020
- Preceded by: Jean-Claude Moyret
- Succeeded by: Daniel Vosgien

French ambassador to Uruguay
- In office 30 September 2013 – 26 July 2016
- Preceded by: Jean-Christophe Potton
- Succeeded by: Philippe Bastelica

Personal details
- Born: 20 March 1959 (age 67) Bamako, French Sudan
- Children: 4

Sylvain Itté (born 20 March 1959) is a French diplomat. Itté is currently serving as the French ambassador to Colombia, having previously served as the ambassador to Niger, Angola, and Uruguay. Itté gained international attention during his ambassadorship to Niger, becoming a flashpoint in French–Nigerien relations during the 2023 coup d'état in Niger and ensuing international crisis.

== Early life and education ==
Born in present-day Mali, Itté grew up in several different African countries until the age of six. He then lived in multiple European countries until settling in France, earning a master's degree in public law from the Institut régional d'administration de Lille.

== Career ==
In 1985 Itté served in the French armed forces and was stationed in Berlin. He next worked at the Ministry of Foreign Affairs in Paris as an office manager, beginning in 1988. From 1991 to 1993, he worked as a technical adviser in the cabinet of the defense ministry and then served as deputy consul general in São Paulo, Brazil. Returning to the Foreign Affairs Ministry Itté served as a department head. From 1998 to 2000 he headed the department of the Minister for Cooperation and Francophone. He then worked as consul general in Madrid, Spain, then as Counselor in the French embassy in Cameroon. From 2006 to 2009 Itté was the director general of the French department Coopération Internationale. From 2009 to 2012 he worked again in São Paulo, this time as Consul General. From 2012 to 2013 he served as the cabinet director of the Assistant Minister for French Abroad.

Itté was appointed the French ambassador to Uruguay, serving in the position from September 2013 to July 2016. He was then made French ambassador to Angola, serving from September 2016 to October 2020.

Itté was then appointed as ambassador to Niger in October 2022. While serving as ambassador to Niger, a coup in the country occurred, with the National Council for the Safeguard of the Homeland assuming control of the government. On 25 August 2023, in the midst of the international crisis that followed, the National Council ordered him to leave the country in 48 hours. French President Emmanuel Macron announced he was keeping Itté at his post despite the ultimatum for his departure. Itté's diplomatic immunity and visa, and that of his family, were revoked on 31 August and Nigerien police were ordered to remove him from the country, although this did not happen. On 15 September Macron accused the Nigerien junta of holding Itté and his staff hostage by blocking food deliveries to the embassy, with Itté reportedly living off military rations. On 24 September, it was announced by the French government that Itté and other diplomatic staff in Niger were to be recalled to France.

Itté wrote the geopolitical book Au cœur de la diplomatie française en Afrique (At the heart of French diplomacy in Africa), originally set to be released in March 2024. As of January 2024, the book's release is in doubt as its publication has been blocked by the French Foreign Ministry due to potentially sensitive information being included.

It was announced on 5 July 2024 that Itté was to be appointed by President Macron as the French ambassador to Colombia, becoming effective 15 August 2024. By 2025, Itté had brought a lawsuit for defamation against Nathalie Yamb in Geneva, Switzerland, reportedly with the blessing of the French government.
