= Drongo Company =

American PSYOP unit for Africa

Delta Company, 7th Psychological Operations Psychological Operations Battalion
- Active: 16 July 2026–present
- Country: United States
- Branch: United States Army
- Role: Psychological operations
- Part of: United States Africa Command; 3rd Special Forces Group; 7th Psychological Operations Battalion
- Garrison/HQ: Fort Bragg, North Carolina
- Mottos: "Potentia et Adduco" ("To Influence and Persuade")

Commanders
- Current commander: Captain Richard Koch

Delta Company, 7th Psychological Operations Battalion, nicknamed Drongo Company, is a US psychological operations unit operating since July 2026 throughout the United States Africa Command (AFRICOM) area of responsibility.

Set up to do operations "across contested environments", the unit is part of a wider shift in US military strategy on the African continent. The shift in strategy has been described as going for African partner forces to take the lead in battling extremist groups with the US providing intelligence sharing and other forms of support. Local campaigns are targeting support for extremist groups such as Al Qaeda, Boko Haram and ISIS.

== Background ==
The activation followed the pull-back of several combat units from African nations, such as a short-lived anti-ISIS campaign in Nigeria, and the closing of drone bases in Niger. At the same time US military is doubling down on its air war in Somalia and constructing new drone bases in Morocco. Other Western forces are also withdrawing their military presences from Africa, such as France's withdrawal from West Africa, completing with the transfer of its last military bases to Senegal in 2025. This is happening amid pressure created by the growing influence of China and Russia across the continent, resulting in reduced access and basing for the US Army. AFRICOM commander Dagvin Anderson has put the decline of US control in the region over the last decade at "about 75%".

The 7th Psychological Operations Battalion, also based out of Fort Bragg, was activated in 2011. They garnered public attention in 2025 for their ominous recruitment videos posted online. In 2017 they launched a PSYOP battalion "forged for Africa".

== History ==
Drongo Company was activated by the US Army's 1st Special Forces Command on July 16, 2026 in a ceremony held at Fort Bragg. Captain Richard Koch assumed command of the unit.

== Name ==
The company's nickname is derived from the Drongo family of birds, native to Africa. The bird is famous for its mimicry, being able to copy other animals' calls. According to the army the name "pays tribute to the mission of [...] influenc[ing] the objective reasoning, motives and behaviors of key audiences".
