= French military withdrawal from West Africa (2022–2025) =

- Part of the Mali War, the War in the Sahel and the war on terror
Date	18 March 2022 – 18 July 2025
Location	Mali, Burkina Faso, Niger, Central African Republic, Chad, Senegal, Ivory Coast
Result	Conclusion of French military presence in Mali, Burkina Faso, Niger, Central African Republic, Chad, Senegal, and Ivory Coast; France retains military presence in Gabon and Djibouti; Marked diminishment of French military influence in West and Central Africa

Beginning in 2022, France began to withdraw military troops from several West African nations following decades of military presence and interventions. Mali, Burkina Faso, Niger, and Chad unilaterally terminated their defense agreements, unlike the Central African Republic, Senegal, and the Ivory Coast, where French forces withdrew without a formal cancellation of the agreements. The withdrawal coincided with increasing opposition to French military intervention in the Islamist insurgency in the Sahel, as well as numerous military coups either with French support or with French participation, particularly in the "Coup Belt".

The withdrawal marked a fundamental shift in Franco-African relations, with several media outlets and geopolitical analysts stating that it represented the decline of Françafrique— France's sphere of military, economic, and geopolitical influence over its former colonies. The withdrawals also represented the shift of African interests away from security and development treaties with the western world, towards different parties such as China, India, the Gulf States, and especially Russia.

The defense agreements between France and French-speaking African countries established cooperation in defense and security matters and were often accompanied by secret clauses, allowing France to intervene militarily. Such interventions were often used to support, dispose, or install governments with French interests; to fight jihadism—particularly in the Sahel—or to put an end to civil wars. The departure of French troops from much of the African continent has marred "Françafrique", if not marking its end.

== Background ==
The French Community in 1959.

Following the independence of French African colonies beginning in 1959, France continued to maintain a sphere of influence over the new countries, known as Françafrique, which was critical to then President Charles de Gaulle's vision of France as a global power (or grandeur in French) and as a bulwark to British and American influence in a post-colonial world. Operating through both formal and informal channels, this system was characterized by several key elements: the "African cell" of presidential advisors who shaped African policy, the franc zone currency union, extensive cooperation accords, and stability-focused and interventionist military policies involving permanent settlement of French troops in Francophone nations.

After this decolonisation, France established formal defence agreements with many francophone countries in sub-Saharan Africa. These arrangements allowed France to establish itself as a guarantor of stability in the region. France adopted an interventionist policy in Africa, resulting in on average one military intervention per year from 1960 to the mid-1990s. They involved countries such as Benin (Operation Verdier in 1991), Central African Republic (Operation Barracuda in 1979 and Operation Almandin in 1996), Chad (Opération Bison in 1968–72, Opération Tacaud in 1978, Operation Manta in 1983 and Opération Épervier in 1986), Comoros (Operation Oside in 1989 and Operation Azalee in 1995), Democratic Republic of Congo (Operation Léopard in 1978 and Operation Baumier in 1991 when it was Zaire, and Operation Artemis in 2003), Djibouti (Operation Godoria in 1991), Gabon (1964 and Operation Requin in 1990), Ivory Coast (Opération Licorne in 2002), Mauritania (Opération Lamantin in 1977), Republic of Congo (Opération Pélican in 1997), Rwanda (Operation Noroît in 1990–93, Operation Amaryllis in 1994 and Opération Turquoise in 1994), Togo (1986), Senegal (to prevent a coup in 1962) and Sierra Leone (Operation Simbleau in 1992). France often intervened to protect French nationals, to put down rebellions or prevent coups, and to restore order, often to the support of particular African leaders.

In 2012, militant groups affiliated with Al-Qaeda attempted to seize parts of Mali with the intent to take control of other areas within the region. In response, France increased its presence in order to provide military assistance to Sahelian countries. This was defined by Operation Serval under the leadership of former president Francois Hollande, in order to prevent Islamist militants from seizing Bamako, Mali. The success of this operation was short-lived as militant groups began to appear in neighbouring nations, including Chad and Burkina Faso. By 2014, the French military sent over 5,000 troops to the Sahel under Operation Barkhane as means to support governments throughout the region in their struggle against Islamist groups.

== Withdrawal ==
In 2024, Niger, Burkina Faso, and Mali announced their withdrawal from the ECOWAS. The countries had earlier been suspended from ECOWAS due to military takeovers of their respective governments. On 6 July 2024, the military leaders of Mali, Niger, and Burkina Faso at a summit in Niamey, Niger, signed a confederation treaty to create an alternative military alliance. The signing marked the conclusion of the first joint summit of the Alliance of Sahel States.

In November 2024, the special politician for French operations in Africa, Jean-Marie Bockel, submitted a report to President Emmanuel Macron on the reconfiguration of France's African military presence, advocating a "renewed" and "rebuilt" partnership. France plans to reduce the pre-positioned forces it has on its military bases. The new terms of France's military presence in Africa intended for a significant reduction to maintain only a permanent liaison detachment, while adapting the offer of military cooperation to the needs expressed by African countries. The strategy emphasized significant troop reductions across all bases, except in Djibouti and Gabon.

On 6 January 2025, French President Emmanuel Macron said that France was right to intervene militarily in the African Sahel against Islamist militants, and said he was still waiting for the Sahel states to "thank" France while denying that the French military had been forced to leave the region.

On January 23, 2025, after the withdrawal of the French army from several African countries, the French Ministry of Foreign Affairs announced that it will invest in fewer military bases and more schools in the future in the region. This approach to the African continent will be characterized by initiatives focusing in particular on climate, education and health.

=== Mali ===
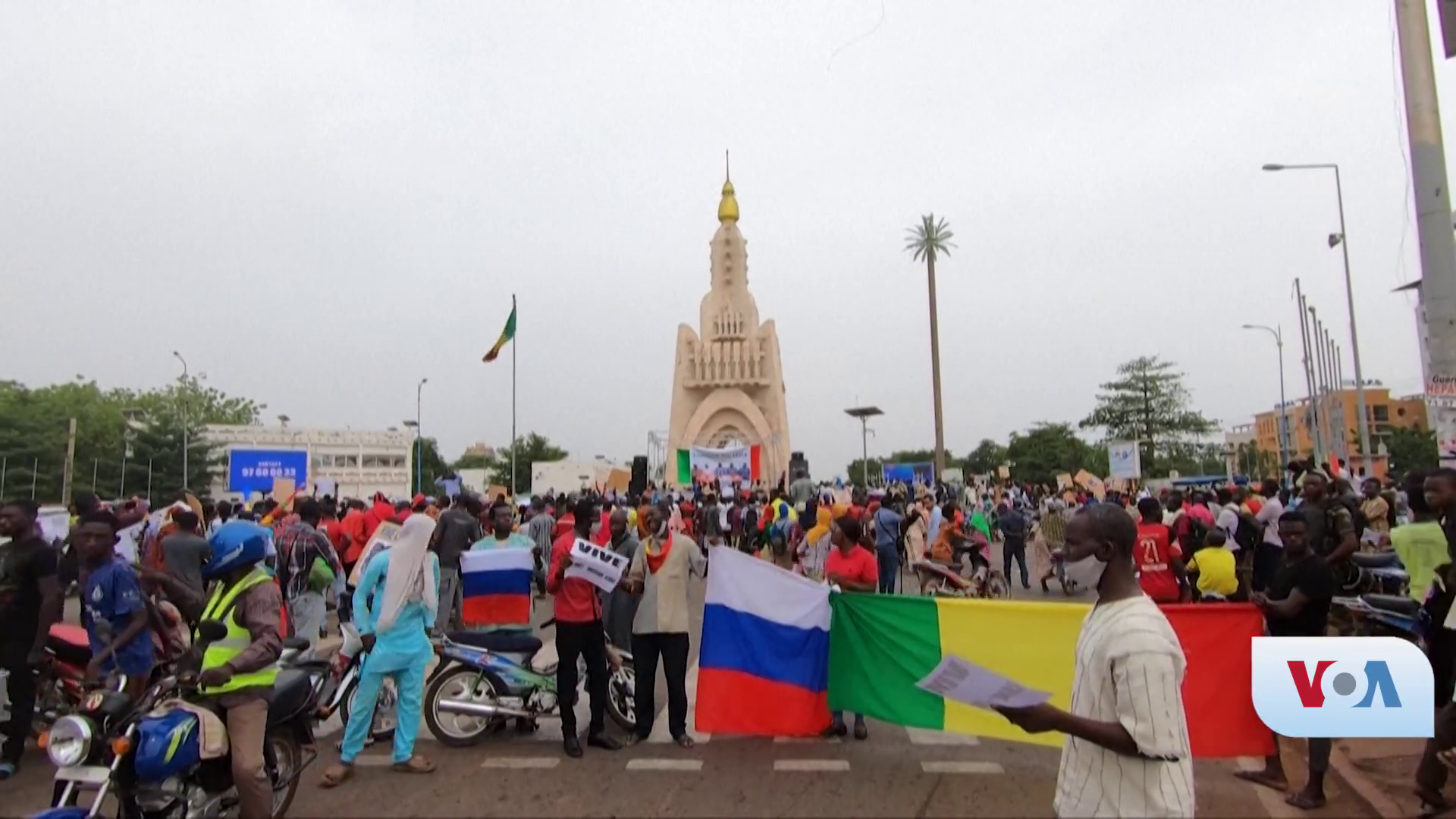
Demonstrations in Bamako, Mali, in favour of the military government following the 2021 coup d'état.

Operation Serval (French: Opération Serval) was a military campaign undertaken with the primary objective of removing Islamic extremists from the northern region of Mali, where they had initiated an offensive towards the central areas of the country. The operation concluded on 15 July 2014, and was succeeded by Operation Barkhane, which was launched on 1 August 2014 to expand the French military's operations over a vast area of the Sahel region and continue combatting Islamist insurgents in the Sahel region. In a survey conducted by the Friedrich Ebert Foundation, fewer than fifty percent of the individuals surveyed were content with the presence of the French military in the country, especially from those surveyed in southern Mali.

Operation Barkhane is considered less successful than its predecessor, mainly because of the lack of military success, and partially because of the complications in withdrawing French soldiers. As a result of the 2021 Malian coup d'état, French President Emmanuel Macron announced the end of the operation and his intentions to remove troops incrementally. The killing of several civilians in the village of Bounti in 2022, which was carried out by French fighter-jets, sparked one of Mali's most significant anti-France protests against French military intervention and Operation Barkhane.

On 18 March 2022, the military government of Mali asked France to withdraw its troops "without delay". President Macron, however, responded that about 5,000 French troops would leave Mali in an "orderly fashion" over the next four to six months, in order to provide protection for the United Nations Multidimensional Integrated Stabilization Mission in Mali (MINUSMA) and forces of other nations stationed in Mali. France completed its military withdrawal from Mali on 15 August 2022, marking the end of its nearly decade-long military intervention.

=== Burkina Faso ===
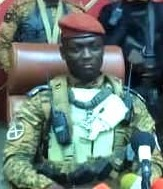
Ibrahim Traoré in 2022

A 2018 military accord between France and Burkina Faso had enabled the deployment of approximately 400 French special forces soldiers to conduct counter-terrorism operations within the country. This arrangement was part of broader French military involvement in the Sahel region, aimed at combating armed groups affiliated with al-Qaeda and the Islamic State who had gained control over substantial territories. Burkina Faso hosted important military installations for both France and the United States, along with a German logistics base.

Burkina Faso experienced a military coup in September 2022, leading to the establishment of a transitional government under President Ibrahim Traoré. This new administration emphasized national sovereignty and self-reliance in security matters, with government spokesman Rimtalba Jean Emmanuel Ouedraogo stating that Burkinabe authorities sought to become the primary actors in reclaiming their territory from armed groups. Following the coup, multiple demonstrations occurred calling for the withdrawal of both French troops and diplomatic presence, culminating in an attack on the French cultural center in Ouagadougou in October 2022.

In January 2023, Burkina Faso's military government formally announced the termination of its military agreement with France. This decision required the withdrawal of approximately 400 French special forces personnel from the country within a one-month period. Burkina Faso's Prime Minister Apollinaire J. Kyélem de Tambèla explicitly endorsed a reorientation away from France and western powers towards establishing military ties with Russian military contractors, following discussions with Russian diplomats and a diplomatic visit to Moscow in December 2022. French President Emmanuel Macron initially requested clarification regarding the decision, while expressing concern about Russia's growing influence in the region, which he characterized as "predatory."

February 2023 marked the official conclusion of French military operations in Burkina Faso, marked by a formal flag-lowering ceremony at a military camp near Ouagadougou, attended by senior officers from both nations.

=== Niger ===
In the wake of the 2023 coup d'état and the following crisis, thousands of Nigeriens stormed the French embassy. Its walls and gates were set ablaze and damaged after they were topped with Russian flags. The demonstrators also called for an immediate intervention by the Wagner Group. On 25 August, the junta ordered French ambassador Sylvain Itté to leave the country within 48 hours.

In August 2023, Niger denounced “cooperation agreements in the field of security and defense” with France by a decree announcing the end of the various military and defense agreements with France. Shortly afterwards, French president Emmanuel Macron announced it plans to end its military presence in Niger, with Macron stating "we are not there to deal with internal politics and be hostages of putschists." France does not recognize de facto leadership of Niger, maintaining that Mohamed Bazoum is the legitimate leader.

In December 2023, it was announced that France intended to close its embassy in Niamey due to it being unable to carry out diplomatic tasks due to restrictions imposed by the ruling junta.

=== Central African Republic ===
France had previously deployed over 1,000 troops to the Central African Republic in 2013 under Operation Sangaris, which lasted until 2016.

In mid-2021, Paris suspended military cooperation with Bangui over an alleged Russian-led anti-French campaign. On 15 December 2022, France completed its military withdrawal as the last 47 soldiers of the logistical mission (MISLOG-B) departed from Bangui M'Poko International Airport, ending direct French military presence amid deteriorating bilateral relations and the deployment of the Wagner Group.

=== Chad ===
The Chadian administration expressed dissatisfaction with limited financial support from France and the European Union for electoral processes following the country's political transition following Idriss Déby's death. Additionally, disagreements emerged regarding Chad's support of the Rapid Support Forces in the Sudanese civil war beginning in April 2023.

On 28 November 2024, Chad announced it would end a defense and security cooperation agreement with France, dating from 1966, and revised in 2019. Per a government statement, Chad intended to maintain "constructive relations with France in other areas of common interest, for the benefit of both peoples". On November 29, France acknowledged the denunciation of the defense and security cooperation agreements with Chad. On December 5, Chad set up a commission responsible for implementing the denunciation of the military cooperation agreements between France and Chad. France, for its part, has announced that it has entered into discussions on the termination of the military and security cooperation contract with Chad. On December 6, demonstrations in support of the termination of military cooperation agreements took place in Chad.

Chad's Minister of Foreign Affairs Abderaman Koulamallah framed the decision as an assertion of national sovereignty, describing the existing military agreement as obsolete and misaligned with contemporary geopolitical realities. The minister emphasized that this move did not represent a simple substitution of one foreign power for another, but rather a fundamental recalibration of Chad's strategic partnerships.

Prior to the defense agreement's termination, France maintained approximately 1,000 military personnel in Chad, stationed at bases in Abéché and N'Djamena. The withdrawal process began with French forces evacuating their base at Faya-Largeau, located in northern Chad. The evacuation proceeded rapidly, with an initial contingent of 120 soldiers departing for France, accompanied by 70 tons of cargo transported via Antonov 124 aircraft. The remaining military vehicles were scheduled for repatriation through Cameroon's port of Douala by January 2025.

On January 10, 2025, the Abéché military base was returned to Chad by France, and the N'Djamena air military base began to be emptied. On January 21, 2025, the french Minister Delegate for Remembrance and Veterans, Patricia Mirallès, confirmed that all French troops present in Chad would leave on time.

The last air base in Chad, the Sergent Adji Kossei base, or commonly 172 Fort-Lamy, is being handed over, starting January 31, 2025. Repatriating French military equipment from Chad via the port of Douala in Cameroon could take several months.

=== Senegal ===
In November 2024, Senegal announced plans to end the French military presence of 350 troops on its territory, becoming the first democratically governed nation in the region to request French withdrawal. The announcement coincided with the Thiaroye massacre's 80th anniversary, regarded as a crucial point in French–Senegalese relations where between 35 and 300 French West African soldiers were killed and lynched by the French Army due to protesting poor conditions and unpaid wages. President of Senegal Bassirou Dioumaye Faye, elected on a platform emphasizing national and economic sovereignty from the western world and seeking reparations against France for historic wrongs, set a timeline for complete withdrawal "by the end of 2025". The end of the presence of French forces in Senegal is planned for September 2025. On March 7, 2025, France returned several facilities used by the French army in Senegal, the first transferred as part of its military withdrawal from Senegal, where it had been present since 1960. On July 1, 2025, France handed over the Rufisque joint station to Senegal. This station, active since 1960, was responsible for communications on the southern Atlantic coast. It also served as a listening station in the fight against maritime trafficking. The handover was carried out without ceremony, limited to the signing of a report. The handover of the last remaining military infrastructure in Senegal to the Senegalese authorities is planned. On July 18, 2025, the two military sites will be returned to the Senegalese government: the airport base and Camp Geille, a 5-hectare site located in Ouakam. Four villas located in Plateau, near the port, will also be transferred to the Senegalese authorities. On July 14, 2025, Christine Fages, French Ambassador to Senegal, declared, "In accordance with the guidelines established in 2022 by President Macron, France will return to Senegal the military bases of the French elements in Senegal, on July 18, 2025.

=== Ivory Coast ===
Ivory Coast officials announced in December 2024 that the French military would withdraw from the nation. President Alassane Ouattara revealed the planned withdrawal during his end-of-year address, characterizing it as a mutual decision reached in coordination with French authorities. The announcement emphasized the modernization of Armed Forces of the Republic of Ivory Coast as a key factor enabling the transition. Under the withdrawal plan, control of the strategically significant Port Bouët military installation would transfer from French to Ivorian forces. At the time, the nation hosted the largest remaining amount of French troops stationed in West Africa, with approximately 600 military personnel stationed there. On February 20, 2025, France officially handed over its sole military base in Ivory Coast to local authorities, marking a significant shift in their bilateral relations. This decision aligns with France's broader strategy to reduce its military footprint in West Africa, following similar withdrawals from countries like Chad, Senegal, Mali, Niger, and Burkina Faso. The base, previously home to the 43rd Marine Infantry Battalion (43rd BIMA), has been transferred to Ivorian control and renamed Camp Thomas d'Aquin Ouattara, in honor of the nation's first army chief. This move reflects Ivory Coast's growing emphasis on national sovereignty and the modernization of its armed forces. France had occupied the Port-Bouët military base for more than 50 years.

=== Gabon ===
Gabon is home to one of the last two permanent bases of the French army in Africa, and France continues its disengagement. From July 1, 2025, only about a hundred French soldiers will remain in Libreville, compared to more than 1,000 a decade ago. This cooperation is modernizing and now takes the form of an academy, through the co-financing of the School of Administration of the Defense Forces of Libreville.

=== Djibouti ===
Djibouti continues to be home to a permanent French army base, hosting around 1,500 personnel in what France intends to be its military headquarters for Africa.

== Impact ==
=== Africa ===
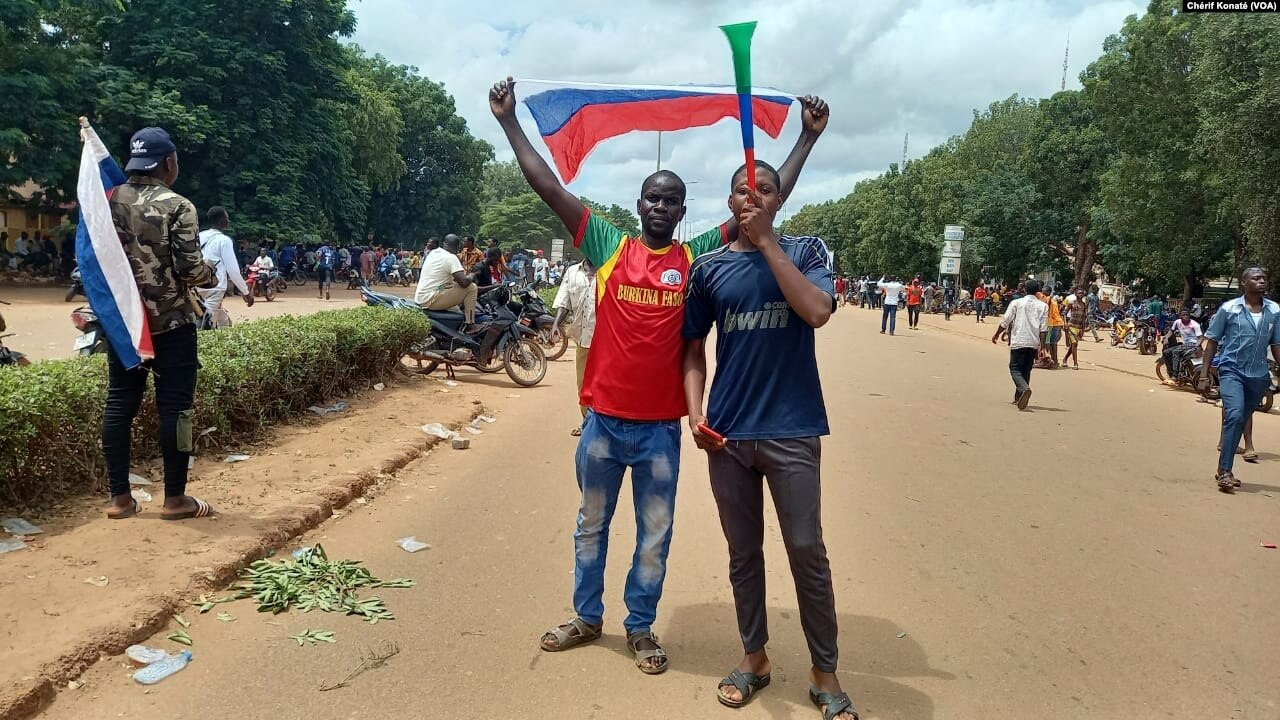
Burkina Faso civilians showing support for Russia following its embassy's reopening in 2023.

The reduction of French military presence coincided with increasing Russian influence in the region. Following the withdrawal of French forces, the governments of Mali, Burkina Faso, and Niger strengthened their ties with Russia, accepting the deployment of Russian mercenaries to support counter-insurgency operations in the Sahel. Throughout 2024, Russian engagement with both countries intensified, including high-level meetings between Russian President Vladimir Putin and Russian Minister of Foreign Affairs Sergei Lavrov with Chadian leadership. Russian diplomatic efforts included attempts to negotiate new military cooperation agreements, particularly seeking port access in Senegal to support its regional operations. This led Ukraine to fund opposition groups which in turn caused a proxy war between Russia and Ukraine.

By the beginning of 2025, the number of French troops in Africa had contracted significantly, with remaining forces limited primarily to installations in Djibouti and Gabon, totaling fewer than 2,000 personnel. The first half of 2024 saw a 25% increase in civilian casualties in affected regions, with 3,064 deaths recorded by the Armed Conflict Location and Event Data Project. While a direct causal relationship between French withdrawal and increased violence cannot be established, security analysts noted that the withdrawal of French soldiers created a significant security vacuum. Several deals were made between African Francophone nations and international parties in order to re-establish stability, including military partnerships with Russian forces and a deal between Chad and the United Arab Emirates involving UAE financial aid in exchange for Chad providing an airport for use as a logistical hub in support of the Rapid Support Forces (RSF) in the Sudanese civil war.

=== France ===
The Institute for the Study of War reported that the announcements by Chad and Senegal to terminate their defense accords resulted in a weakening of France's remaining logistical and military presence in Central and West Africa and a further decline in France's influence across its former colonial territories. France generally responded to its diminishing influence in Francophone African nations by strengthening economic ties with African Anglophone nations, particularly Nigeria and South Africa, which became France's largest trading partners in Africa.

== Analysis ==
Director and Senior Fellow of the Center for Strategic and International Studies Africa Program, Mvemba Phezo Dizolele, regarded the French withdrawals as a marker of the resistance from African populations to potential NATO expansion into Africa due to Europe's colonial and postcolonial history and unsuccessful military interventions. The think tank noted that French and NATO's focus on hard security was poorly suited for Africa's primary needs centering around infrastructure development. In contrast, comprehensive partnership approaches combining defense, security, technology, and infrastructure development from China, India, and Turkey addressed these fundamental development requirements better, resulting in shifting relations.

CSIS Africa Program Associate Fellow Catherine Nzuki regarded the withdrawals as a representation of the rejection of paternalism in Western-African relations, involving the use of leverage by more powerful states to influence weaker states' decisions. She emphasized the dynamic's presence in the Françafrique concept, which characterized decades of French military interventions, political involvement, and economic influence in former colonies. She stated that French attempts to established more balanced, reciprocal relations with former colonies following several coups by anti-French juntas were generally regarded as superficial and lacking substantial diplomatic changes.

Middle East and Africa geopolitical analyst and researcher Jonathan-Fenton Harvey regarded the withdrawal of French troops from West Africa, and especially Chad, as a significant turning point in western and African geopolitical affairs. He noted that Chad and Senegal represented "a cornerstone" of French military strategy in Africa, facilitating power projection into the Sahel, Central Africa, and Libya, which for the Sahel region had corresponded with the military government's engagement of Russian military contractors.

He believed that the withdrawals represented a French movement from Francophone Africa and towards Anglophone African nations such as Nigeria due to France's colonial history presenting fewer obstacles. This strategic pivot included significant economic agreements with Nigeria, Africa's largest economy. In contrast, he noted that the shift of Francophone African nations towards pursuing partnerships with nations outside of the western world including such as China, India, Turkey, and the United Arab Emirates, reflected the emergence of a multipolar world order where military treaties and earlier historical relations were growing less significant in determining international relationships.

Following the French military withdrawal from Africa, private military companies quickly offered their services to states wishing to outsource a wide range of missions ranging from logistical support, securing sites, training, and the protection of personalities.

== See also ==
- 1954 Geneva Conference
- Decolonization in Africa
- Françafrique
