= M62 =

M62 or M-62 may refer to:

== Military ==
- FAB-500 M-62, a variant of the FAB-500 Soviet/Russian air-dropped bomb
- M62, a Finnish military camouflage pattern of the year 1962 uniform; see M05
- Valmet M62, a Finnish assault rifle

== Transportation ==
- M62 motorway, in England
- M-62 (Michigan highway), a state highway in Michigan
- M62 locomotive, a Soviet heavy freight diesel locomotive
- BMW M62, a 1994 automobile engine
- Shvetsov ASh-62, an aircraft engine produced in the Soviet Union

== Other uses ==
- Messier 62, a globular cluster in the constellation Ophiuchus
- M62 Movement, a Nigerien political movement
