= France–Niger relations =

- Niger: France

France–Niger relations are the foreign relations between France and Niger. Their relations are based on a long shared history and the more-than-sixty-year rule of Niger by the French colonial empire, beginning with the French conquest in 1898. Niger obtained independence from France in 1960, and a history of French influenced culture and French language have been a point of commonality in the creation of a distinctive Nigerien culture from the diverse pre-colonial nationalities which make up modern Niger. France benefited economically from their time as a colonial power, and still relies on imports from Niger for elements of their economy.

== Colonialism and decolonisation ==
Niger has maintained close ties with France, its former colonial power throughout the history of the Nigerien Republic. Following Niger's independence in 1960, France maintained several hundred advisers at all levels of Niger's government and military. In the 1960s, the Military of Niger was drawn entirely from Nigerien former members of the French Colonial Forces: officered by Frenchmen who agreed to take joint French-Nigerien citizenship. In 1960 there were only ten African officers in the Nigerien army, all of low rank. President Diori signed legislation to end employment of expatriate military officers in 1965, though some continued to serve until the 1974 coup when all French military presence was evacuated. As well, the French had maintained until 1974 around 1000 troops of the 4th Régiment Interarmes d'Outre-Mer (Troupes de Marine) with bases at Niamey, Zinder, Bilma and Agadez. In 1979 a smaller French force was again based permanently in Niger. In the aftermath of the 2023 Nigerien coup d'état, France abandoned all of its bases in the country and by December 2023, all French troops had left.

== Current economic ties ==
Franco-Nigerien relations continue to be close, with France as Niger's top export partner by value and Niger as the second largest supplier of uranium to France. The French government developed large uranium mining sites in the town of Arlit, with France being a major contributor to Niger's net exports as large amounts of uranium are transported from Niger to France. (One source estimates that France receives 25% of their Uranium from Niger.) More recently, Niger criticized France for the agreement, arguing that Niger should retain a larger share of profits from uranium ore mining.

== Diplomatic relations ==
While conflicts have developed and subsided between the two independent republics, France maintains a strong diplomatic presence in Niamey and several thousand French expatriates live across the nation. Niger in turn maintains one of its only 24 foreign embassies in Paris along with three Honorary consular offices (in Bordeaux, Lyon, and Marseille) serving a large expatriate and naturalised Niger born population which lives in France.

Mariama Hima, a former Nigerien minister of Social Development, served as an ambassador of Niger in Paris between 1997 and 2003.

In the wake of the 2023 coup d'état and the following crisis, thousands of Nigeriens stormed the French embassy. Its walls and gates were set ablaze and damaged after topping them with Russian flags. The demonstrators also called for an immediate intervention by the Wagner Group. On 25 August the junta ordered French ambassador Sylvain Itte to leave the country within 48 hours.

More recently, France–Niger ties are showing some signs of deterioration. In August 2023, Niger denounced “cooperation agreements in the field of security and defense” with France by a decree announcing the end of the various military and defense agreements with France. Shortly afterwards, French president Emmanuel Macron announced it plans to end its military presence in Niger, with Macron stating "we are not there to deal with internal politics and be hostages of putschists." France does not recognize de facto leadership of Niger, maintaining that Mohamed Bazoum is the legitimate leader.

In December 2023, it was announced that France intended to close its embassy in Niamey because it is unable to carry out diplomatic tasks due to restrictions imposed by the ruling junta.

== Cultural ties ==
Nigerien national culture, made up as it is of a diverse group of pre-colonial national cultures, has been greatly influenced by French culture. The French language continued to be the official language of the Republic of Niger until 2025, when Hausa was declared the new official language. Cultural centers, such as the Centre Culturel Franco-Nigérien Jean Rouch in Niamey and the Center Culturel Franco-Nigérien de Zinder in Zinder, provide major institutions for the growth and promotion of French culture in Niger, as well as promoting Nigerien culture to a French audience. Niger is a founding member of the Organisation internationale de la Francophonie.

== Tensions ==
On 20 June 2025, Niger's ruling junta militia announced its plan to nationalize Somair, a unit of the French uranium company Orano which further escalated tensions between the two nations. Paris and Niamey relations have been deteriorating since 2023 when the military junta staged a coup to take over Niger.The Company Orano - 90% owned by France - holds a 63% stake in Somair. All remaining interest in Somair is owned by Niger's state-run Sopamin.

== Resident diplomatic missions ==
- France has an embassy in Niamey.
- Niger has an embassy in Paris.
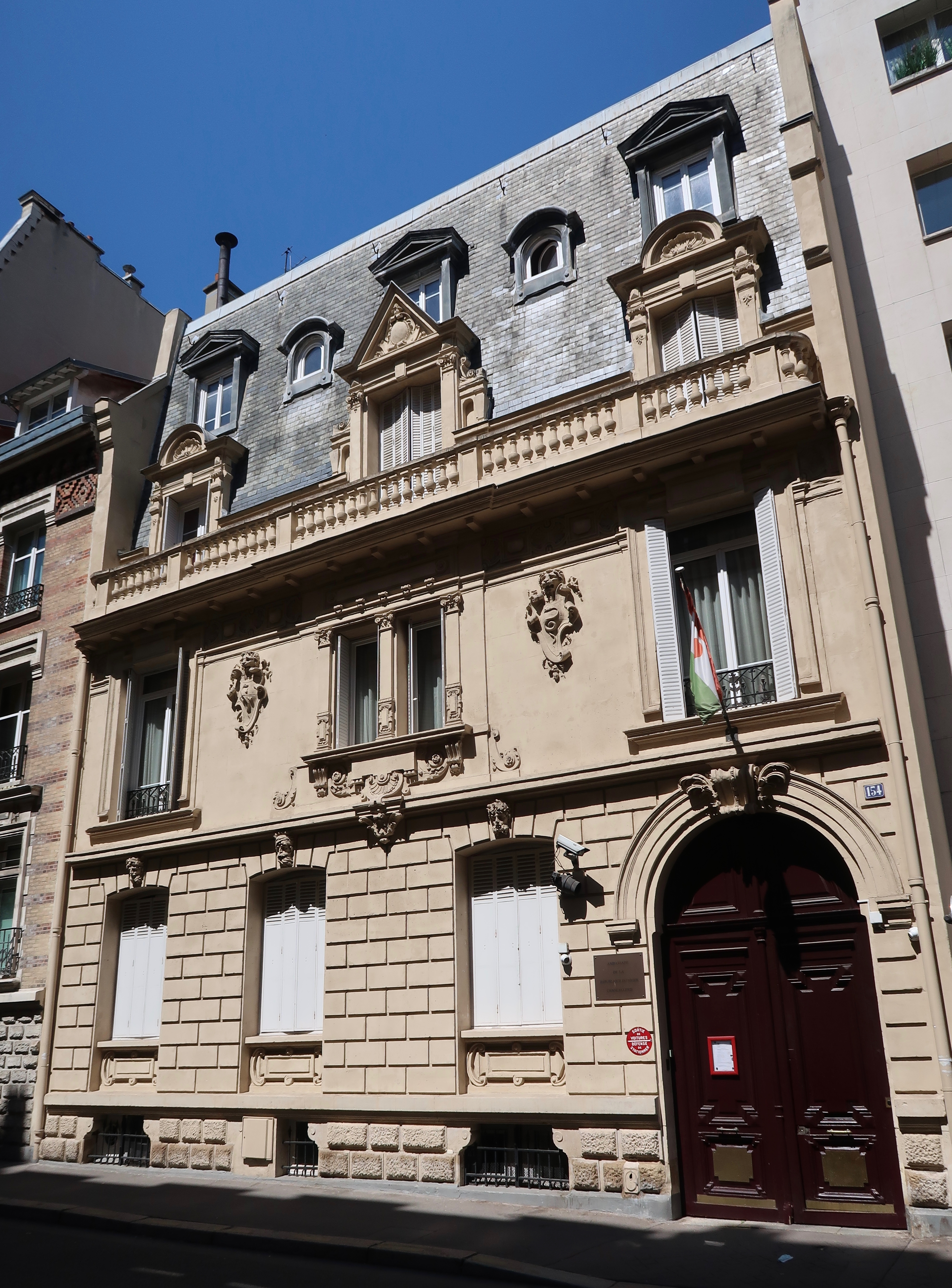
Embassy of Niger in Paris
