= Salaou =

Salaou is a surname. Notable people with the surname include:

- Abundance Salaou (born 2004), Ivorian footballer
- Moussa Salaou Barmou, Nigerien military officer
