= Hamadou Souley =

Nigerien Interior Minister

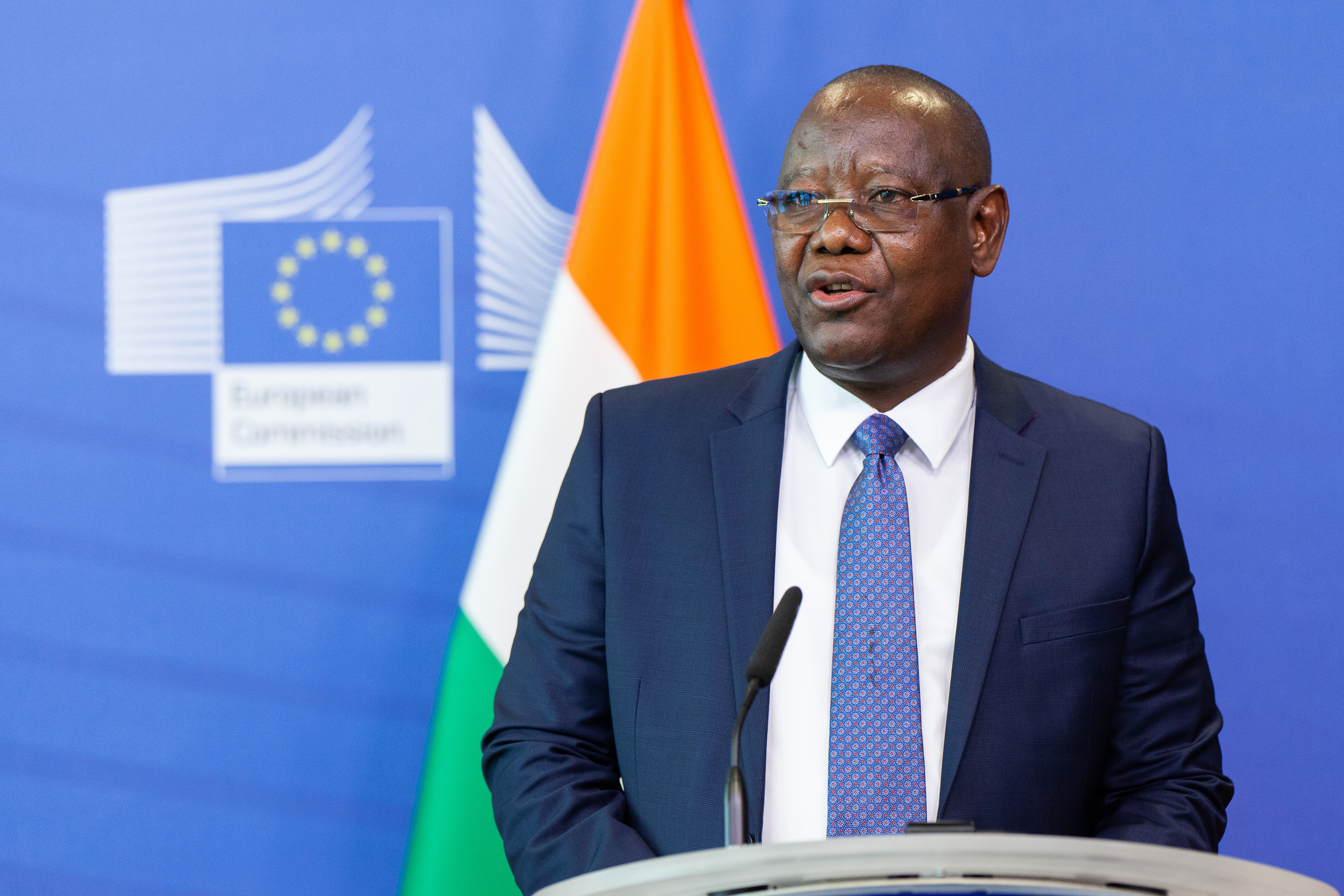
- Hamadou Adamou Souley in 2022

Minister of the Interior
- In office 29 November 2021 – 26 July 2023
- Preceded by: Alkache Alhada
- Succeeded by: Mohamed Toumba

Minister of Public Works
- In office 7 April 2021 – 29 November 2021
- Succeeded by: Gado Sabo Moctar

Hamadou Adamou Souley is a Nigerien politician who served as the Minister of the Interior and Decentralization from November 2021 until his arrest during the 2023 Nigerien coup d'état.

== Biography ==
Souley served as a government minister. Souley remains imprisoned by the National Council for the Safeguard of the Homeland military junta, as of 2025. In April 2025, Transparency International Niger and the Association for the Fight against Corruption (l’Association nigérienne de lutte contre la corruption, ANLC-TI) denounced the continued detention of Souley and other political and civilian figures, describing their arrests as "prolonged and unjust detentions"and "flagrant violations of human rights." They called for the immediate release of Souley, as well as the release of others detained by the junta, including former President Mohamed Bazoum and former First Lady Hadiza Bazoum.
