= Salifou Modi =

Deputy leader of Niger since 2023

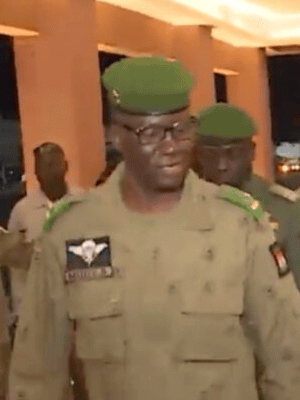
- Modi in 2023

Vice President of the National Council for the Safeguard of the Homeland
- Incumbent
- Assumed office 28 July 2023
- President: Abdourahamane Tiani
- Preceded by: Office created

Minister of Defence
- Incumbent
- Assumed office 10 August 2023

Nigerien Ambassador to the United Arab Emirates
- In office 1 June 2023 – 31 July 2023
- President: Mohamed Bazoum

Chief of Staff of the Niger Armed Forces
- In office 13 January 2020 – 31 March 2023
- President: Mahamadou Issoufou; Mohamed Bazoum
- Preceded by: Ahmed Mohamed
- Succeeded by: Abdou Sidikou Issa

Personal details
- Born: 12 October 1962 (age 64) Zinder, Niger

Military service
- Allegiance: Niger; National Council for the Safeguard of the Homeland
- Branch/service: Niger Army
- Rank: General of the Army
- Battles/wars: 2023 Nigerien coup d'état 2023 Nigerien crisis

Salifou Modi (born 12 October 1962) is a Nigerien military officer who has been the Vice President of the National Council for the Safeguard of the Homeland since 2023. Modi was a member of the Supreme Council for the Restoration of Democracy and participated in the coup against President Mohamed Bazoum. Prior to his vice presidency he was chief of staff of the Niger Armed Forces and ambassador to the United Arab Emirates.

== Career ==
Modi was a member of the Supreme Council for the Restoration of Democracy, a military junta that controlled Niger from 2010 to 2011. Modi later served as a military attaché in Germany.

Ahmed Mohamed, the chief of staff of the Niger Armed Forces, was dismissed on 13 January 2020, due to the deaths of 174 security force members starting in December and a terrorist attack that killed 89 soldiers. President Mohamed Bazoum appointed Modi to succeed Mohamed. Operation Barkhane was carried out with the French military during his tenure. Abdou Sidikou Issa was appointed to succeed him on 1 April 2023, and Modi was promoted to a four-star general three days before the end of his term.

On 1 June 2023, Modi was appointed as Niger's ambassador to the United Arab Emirates. Modi was selected to be Vice President of Niger after a military coup overthrew Bazoum. He led a delegation that met with the leaders of Mali and Burkina Faso, who had gained power via coups in 2021 and 2022, respectively. He met with Russian deputy defense minister Yunus-bek Yevkurov in 2023, for unclear purposes. The BBC subsequently reported that Russian general Andrey Averyanov was in attendance with Yevkurov, and that the meeting affirmed the Wagner Group's old commitments in the wake of Yevgeny Prigozhin's death.

In June 2025, Modi was promoted to the rank of General of the Army, the highest military rank in Niger. Modi attended a Russian military conference involving Niger, Mali, and Burkina Faso in August.

== Works cited ==
=== News ===
- "Attaque de Chinégodar: les chefs d'etat-major limogés". Voice of America. 13 January 2020. Archived from the original on 29 June 2025.
- "Le Niger et Barkhane ont mené 15 "opérations conjointes" de juillet à octobre". Voice of America. 29 October 2022. Archived from the original on 29 June 2025.
- "Niger Army Chief Fired After 89 Killed in Extremist Attack". Voice of America. 13 January 2020. Archived from the original on 29 June 2025.
- "Niger: l'ancien Chef d'Etat-major Salifou Mody nommé Ambassadeur auprès des Emirats Arabes Unis". Agence Nigérienne de Presse. 1 June 2023. Archived from the original on 1 June 2023.
- Bonny, Sidonie (3 August 2023). "Niger junta appoints civilians to Cabinet, member of military as vice president". Anadolu Agency. Archived from the original on 29 June 2025.
- Inwood, Joe; Tacchi, Jake (20 February 2024). "Wagner in Africa: How the Russian mercenary group has rebranded". BBC. Archived from the original on 29 June 2025.
- Peltier, Elian (2 August 2023). "A Leader of Niger's Coup Visits Mali, Raising Fears of a Wagner Alliance". The New York Times. Archived from the original on 29 June 2025.
