= Amadou Abdramane =

Nigerien Air Force Colonel

Colonel Major Amadou Abdramane

Member of the collective leadership of the National Council for the Safeguard of the Homeland
- In office 26 July 2023 – 28 July 2023
- Leader: Abdourahamane Tiani
- Preceded by: Office was established
- Succeeded by: Abdourahamane Tiani

Spokesperson of the National Council for the Safeguard of the Homeland
- Incumbent
- Assumed office 26 July 2023
- Preceded by: Office established

Personal details
- Born: Nigeria

Military service
- Allegiance: Niger; National Council for the Safeguard of the Homeland
- Branch/service: Niger Air Force
- Rank: Colonel
- Battles/wars: 2023 Nigerien coup d'état and the 2023 Nigerien crisis

Amadou Abdramane is a Nigerien Air Force officer who has served as the spokesperson of the National Council for the Safeguard of the Homeland since the coup d'état on 26 July 2023 and participated in the installation of Abdourahamane Tiani as President of the Republic of the Niger.

== Career ==
On 26 July 2023, he delivered a televised address announcing that the government and President Mohamed Bazoum had been overthrown, also announcing the suspension of Niger's constitution, the closure of its borders, the suspension of all institutions and a national curfew.
