= Moussa Salaou Barmou =

Nigerien Army general

Brigade General Moussa Salaou Barmou
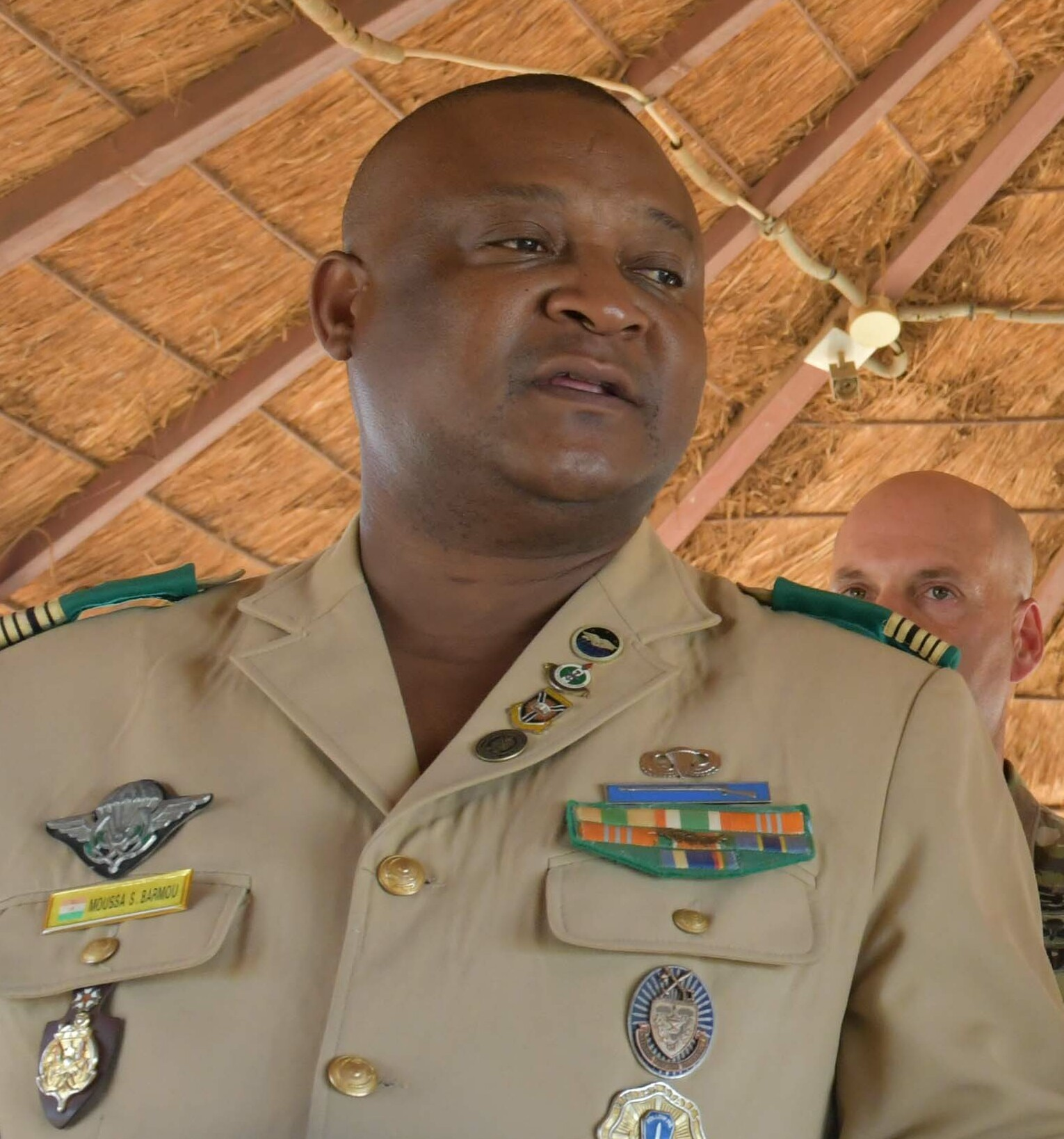
- Barmou as a Colonel in 2021.
- Military career
- Allegiance: Niger; National Council for the Safeguard of the Homeland
- Branch: Niger Army
- Rank: Brigade general
- Conflicts: 2023 Nigerien coup d'état and the 2023 Nigerien crisis

Moussa Salaou Barmou is a Nigerien military officer and one of the leaders of the 2023 coup d'état that removed Mohamed Bazoum from power.

== Career ==
Barmou received training in the United States, both at Fort Moore and the National Defense University.

In 2015, Barmou, who at the time was the Head of Niger's special forces, stated in an interview that Niger was conducting operations against Boko Haram to ensure security and peace.

Barmou stated that the Nigerien Armed Forces had good relations with the United States.

=== Participation in the 2023 Nigerien coup d'état ===
On 26 July 2023, he joined the National Council for the Safeguard of the Homeland, the junta that ousted President Bazoum, who served from 2021 until the military coup occurred. According to Nigerien sources, Barmou was also involved in the encirclement of the Bazoum Presidential palace.

Following the coup, he was identified as the new military chief of staff. He held the role until after the mutiny of 2026, when he was replaced as chief of staff by Brigadier General Mamane Sani Kiaou.
