= Abdou Sidikou Issa =

Nigerien Army general

Division General Abdou Sidikou Issa
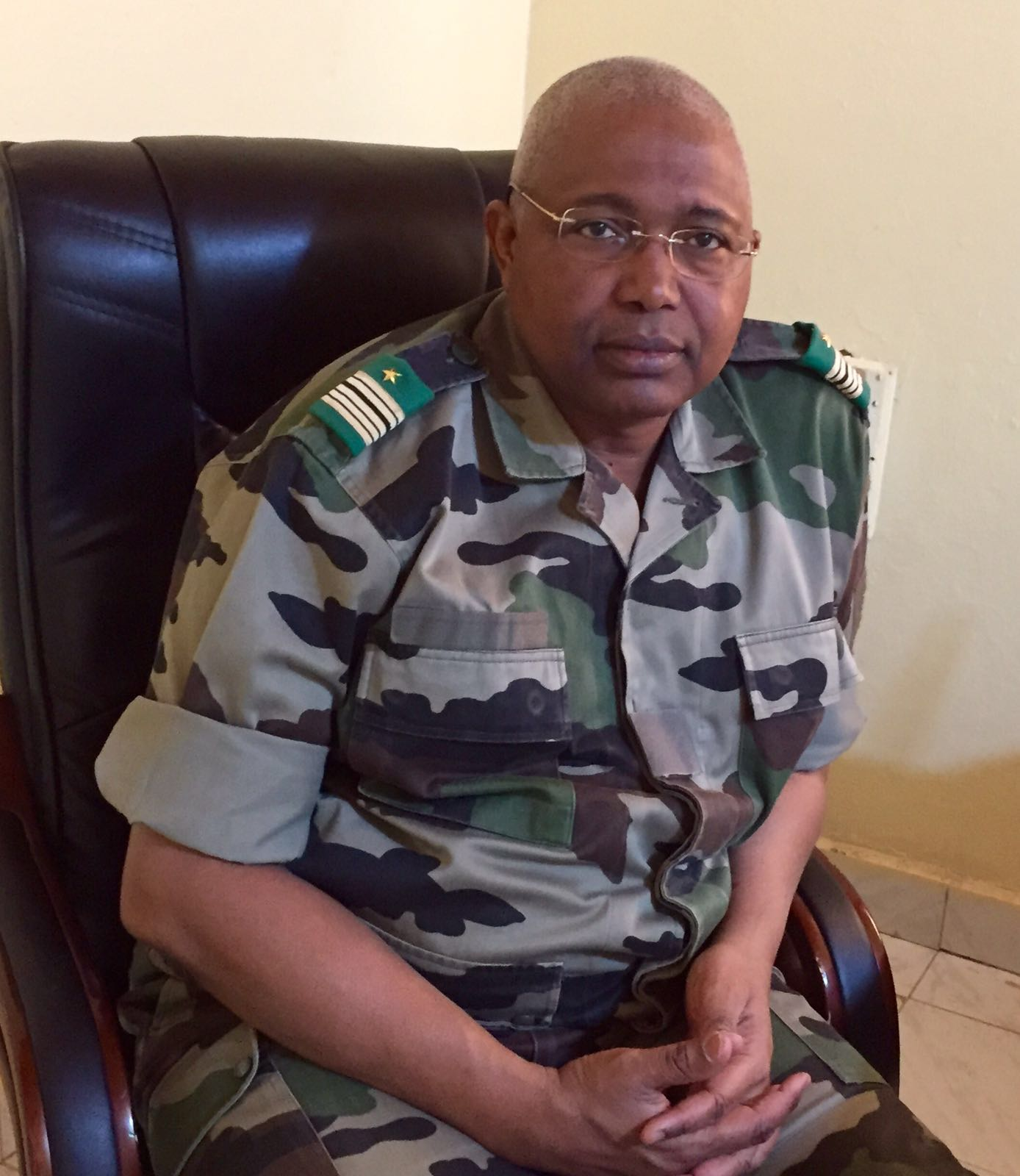
- Sidikou Issa as a Colonel in 2016
- Military career
- Allegiance: Niger; National Council for the Safeguard of the Homeland
- Branch: Niger Army
- Rank: Divisional general
- Conflicts: 2023 Nigerien coup d'état and the 2023 Nigerien crisis

Abdou Sidikou Issa is a Nigerien Army divisional general who served as the chief of staff of the Niger Armed Forces from 31 March 2023 to 5 August 2023 after being appointed by the president and his cabinet. On 26 July 2023, he supported the overthrowing of president Mohamed Bazoum by the National Council for the Safeguard of the Homeland to, in his words, 'avoid a deadly confrontation'. He was dismissed as Chief of Staff on 5 August 2023 by the ruling junta, replaced by Brigadier General Moussa Salaou Barmou, former head of the Nigerien special forces.
