= M62 Movement =

Political movement in Niger

- M62 : Union sacrée pour la sauvegarde de la souveraineté et de la dignité du peuple
- Leaders: Abdoulaye Seydou (arrested, later released after charges dropped)
- Dates active: 4 July 2022–present
- Headquarters: Niamey, Niger
- Active regions: Niger
- Ideology: Pan-Africanism; Sankarism; Anti-imperialism; Anti-French sentiment; Russophilia; Anti-Ukrainian sentiment

The M62 Movement (French: Mouvement M62), officially known as "M62: Sacred Union for the Safeguard of the Sovereignty and Dignity of the People" (French: M62 : Union sacrée pour la sauvegarde de la souveraineté et de la dignité du peuple), is a political movement in Niger. It was established in 2022 by a coalition of civil society organizations, as a reaction against the French military's presence during Operation Barkhane.

The movement organized a series of demonstrations against the French military, becoming the country's largest opposition movement against the Government of Mohamed Bazoum. It supported the 2023 Nigerien coup d'état, following which it held demonstrations outside the French Embassy in Niamey, demanding the withdrawal of the French military from the country.

== History ==
M62 was established by a coalition of fifteen civil society organizations on 4 July 2022, with the purpose of expressing opposition to the French military presence in Operation Barkhane. The movement's leader Abdoulaye Seydou claimed that the French military had massacred civilians, exploited the country's natural resources and prevented Niger from cooperating with neighboring Mali, in an appeal that was supported by Nigerien Pan-Africanists.

M62 organized a series of protests in September 2022, during which hundreds of participants used the flags of Niger and Russia as symbols, while chanting slogans such as: "Barkhane out", "Down with France" and "Long live Putin and Russia". Abdoulaye Seydou has denied any links with the Russian government, stating that "We are fighting for Niger's sovereignty, so we are not with any foreign country partners", and said protest organizers confiscated Russian flags brought by protesters. In an interview with The Irish Times, he described Thomas Sankara as an "idol" for his opposition to neocolonialism. Seydou was arrested by the Government of Mohamed Bazoum just one day after the interview.

M62 became one of the largest opposition movements in the country, denouncing what they described as their "political persecution" by the Bazoum Government. In October 2022, M62 accused the French military forces of massacring civilians during a helicopter raid against an illegal gold mine.

During the 2023 Nigerien coup d'état against President Bazoum, the group came out in support of the coup. On 30 July 2023, M62 rallied thousands of protesters in the Nigerien capital of Niamey, in a march at the request of the military junta's leader Abdourahamane Tiani. The demonstration went to the French embassy carrying Nigerien and Russian flags, demanding the withdrawal of French forces and calling for Russian intervention in the country. The demonstration was dispersed with tear gas before it arrived at the National Assembly.

On 14 August 2023, M62 leader Abdoulaye Seydou was released from prison by the Nigerien Court of Appeal, which cancelled his nine-month sentence. Following the coup, M62 called for protestors to blockade Niamey International Airport until foreign military forces withdrew from the country. On 1 September 2023, M62 organized a sit-in outside of the French embassy in Niamey, demanding that the French military withdraw from Niger.

In August 2024, M62 released a statement praising the Alliance of Sahel States (AES) for breaking ties with Ukraine over alleged Ukrainian involvement in the Malian Civil War, and called for a boycott of all Ukrainian products. On 29 January 2025, M62 called a demonstration to celebrate the exit of Niger and the AES from Economic Community of West African States (ECOWAS).
