= Mohamed Toumba =

Nigerien military officer

General Mohamed Toumba
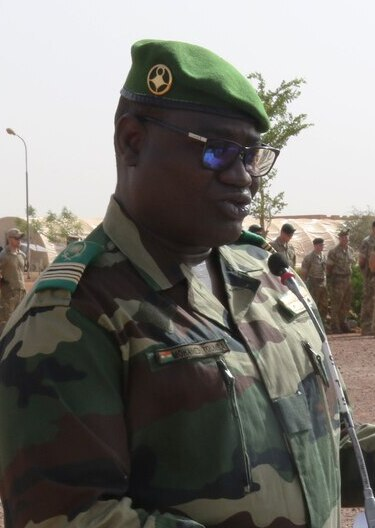
- Col. Toumba in Tahoua, Niger, April 11, 2018

Minister of the Interior and Decentralisation
- Incumbent
- Assumed office 26 July 2023

General Mohamed Boubacar Toumba is a Nigerien military officer who has served as Minister of the Interior and Decentralisation since the coup d'état of 26 July 2023.
