= National Council for the Safeguard of the Homeland =

Ruling military junta of Niger since 2023

- Majalisar Kula da Tsaron Ƙasa المجلس الوطني لحماية الوطن; Conseil national pour la sauvegarde de la patrie
- Central government

Overview
- Established: 26 July 2023
- State: Niger
- Leader: Collective leadership (Until 28 July 2025); Abdourahamane Tiani (From 28 July 2023)
- Headquarters: Niamey

The National Council for the Safeguard of the Homeland (Hausa: Majalisar Kula da Tsaron Ƙasa; Arabic: المجلس الوطني لحماية الوطن, romanized: al-Majlis al-Waṭanī li-Ḥimāyat al-Waṭan; French: Conseil national pour la sauvegarde de la patrie, CNSP) is the ruling military junta of Niger, following the 2023 coup d'état which overthrew President Mohamed Bazoum and the civilian government.

The military junta's takeover of the government led to the Nigerien crisis.

== Origins ==
=== Formation ===
On the evening of 26 July 2023, Niger Air Force Colonel-Major Amadou Abdramane went on state television channel Télé Sahel to claim that President Mohamed Bazoum, who had earlier been detained by the Presidential guard at his official residence in the capital Niamey, had been removed from power and announced the formation of the junta. Seated and flanked by nine other officers wearing fatigues, he said the "defense and security forces" had decided to topple Bazoum’s regime "due to the deteriorating security situation and bad governance." He also announced the suspension of the country's Constitution, the suspension of all state institutions, the closure of the country's borders and a nationwide curfew from 22:00 until 05:00 local time warning against any foreign interventions.

On 27 July, Colonel Abdramane announced on television that all activities by political parties in the country were to be suspended until further notice. At an unknown time, the leadership of the Niger Armed Forces issued a statement signed by the Army chief of staff General Abdou Sidikou Issa declaring its support for the coup, citing the need to "preserve the physical integrity" of the President and his family and avoid "a deadly confrontation... that could create a bloodbath and affect the security of the population."

On 10 August, the junta appointed a new cabinet headed by a civilian prime minister, Ali Lamine Zeine.

=== Leadership ===
On 28 July, presidential guards' Commander General Abdourahamane Tiani proclaimed himself as the president of the council in an address on Télé Sahel. He said the coup was undertaken to avoid "the gradual and inevitable demise" of the country and said that Bazoum had tried to hide "the harsh reality" of the country, which he called "a pile of dead, displaced, humiliation and frustration". He also criticized the government's security strategy for its purported ineffectiveness but did not give a timeline for a return to civilian rule.

== Identified members ==
No.	Portrait	Name (Lifespan)	Member since	Notes
1		Brigade General; Abdourahamane Tiani (born 1960/61 or 1964)	28 July 2023	President, former commander of Niger presidential guard.
2		Divisional General; Salifou Modi (born 1962)	28 July 2023	Vice President, former ambassador to the United Arab Emirates and former chief of staff of the Niger Armed Forces.
3		Divisional General; Abdou Sidikou Issa	26 July 2023	Former chief of staff of the Niger Armed Forces.
4		Brigadier General; Moussa Salaou Barmou	26 July 2023	Chief of staff of the Niger Armed Forces.
5		Colonel Major; Amadou Abdramane	26 July 2023	Spokesperson.
6		Brigadier General; Mohamed Toumba	26 July 2023	
