= 2023 Nigerien coup d'état =

Military coup against President Mohamed Bazoum

2023 Nigerien coup d'etat
- Part of the Coup Belt
Date	26 July 2023
Location	Niamey, Niger
Result	Coup d'état successful: Establishment of the National Council for the Safeguard of the Homeland

Belligerents
Government of Niger; PNDS-Tarayya	Dissident faction of the Niger Armed Forces; M62 Movement

Commanders and leaders
Mohamed Bazoum; Ouhoumoudou Mahamadou; Hassoumi Massaoudou; Hamadou Souley	Abdourahamane Tiani; Amadou Abdramane; Salifou Modi; Abdou Sidikou Issa; Moussa Salaou Barmou

Units involved
Niger Army loyal to Bazoum	Presidential Guard; Niger Army; National Guard of Niger

Strength
Western estimate: At least 5,000 ECOWAS stand-by force	30,000

Political support
ECOWAS; France; Algeria; European Union; United States; African Union; United Nations	Burkina Faso; Mali; Guinea; Russia; Myanmar; Wagner Group

Casualties and losses
At least 1 civilian supporter injured	Several civilian supporters injured

On 26 July 2023, a coup d'état occurred in Niger when the presidential guard detained President Mohamed Bazoum, and presidential guard commander General Abdourahamane Tiani proclaimed himself the leader of a military junta shortly after confirming the coup a success.

This was the fifth military coup d'état since the country gained independence from France in 1960, and the first since 2010. The coup was condemned by the United States and France, and by the West African regional bloc ECOWAS, the latter of which threatened military intervention against the junta, leading to the 2023–2024 Niger crisis.

== Background ==
Niger had previously undergone four military coups since independence from France in 1960, with the most recent having occurred in 2010. In between, there were also several coup attempts, the most recent of which was in 2021 when military dissidents tried to seize the presidential palace two days before the inauguration of president-elect Mohamed Bazoum. (Note: In March 2023, a Nigerien official alleged that another coup attempt was made while Bazoum was in Turkey, although the government refused to comment.) He was the first democratically-elected president to assume office from a similarly elected predecessor. The coup came in the wake of recent coups in nearby countries, such as in Guinea, Mali, and Sudan in 2021, and two in Burkina Faso in January and September 2022, which has led to the region being called a "coup belt".

Niger is a member of ECOWAS, which had already suspended Guinea, Mali and Burkina Faso from membership because of successful coups in recent years. Chairman Bola Tinubu warned that they will not allow another coup in the region and would take up these issues with the African Union and Western countries.

Analysts cite the rising cost of living and perceptions of government "incompetence", as well as Bazoum's plans to replace the head of the presidential guard, General Abdourahmane Tiani, as possible triggers for the coup.

The country frequently ranks at the bottom of the UN's Human Development Index and has also suffered from Islamist insurgencies led by Al-Qaeda, Islamic State and Boko Haram, despite its military receiving training and logistical support from the United States, France and Turkey, which have bases in the country. Disputes with the army over attitudes with ECOWAS' position on military juntas in the region may have also played a part; Salifou Modi, chief of staff of Niger's military, visited Bamako in March 2023 to agree with Mali that it could pursue jihadists on Malian territory, but Bazoum was supportive of ECOWAS in its anti-junta stance; Modi was replaced as chief of staff a few weeks later. Tiani stated that the Nigerien military overthrew Bazoum because of rising insecurity in regard to jihadism, but jihadist violence was decreasing at the time of the coup.

In 2022, the country became the hub of France's anti-jihadist operations in the Sahel region following its expulsion from Mali and Burkina Faso, with Bazoum being described as one of the few remaining pro-Western leaders in the region. Niger became a key ally for Western (particularly French, American, and Turkish) forces. With multiple coups and rising anti-French sentiments in the region, Niger became France's partner of last resort. American-trained officers were also reported to have trained many members of the presidential guard. US military investments in Niger include nearly 1,100 soldiers, drones, a secret CIA base, and millions of dollars in aid.

At the same time, along with anti-French sentiment, a current of thought favorable to the entry of Russian influence and the Wagner Group mercenary company began to grow. Russia, through Wagner, has been gaining ground at the expense of the French in the region, following the latest coups in Mali and Burkina Faso. At the same time, Turkey has also expanded its influence.

== Events ==
=== 26 July ===
==== Bazoum's detention ====
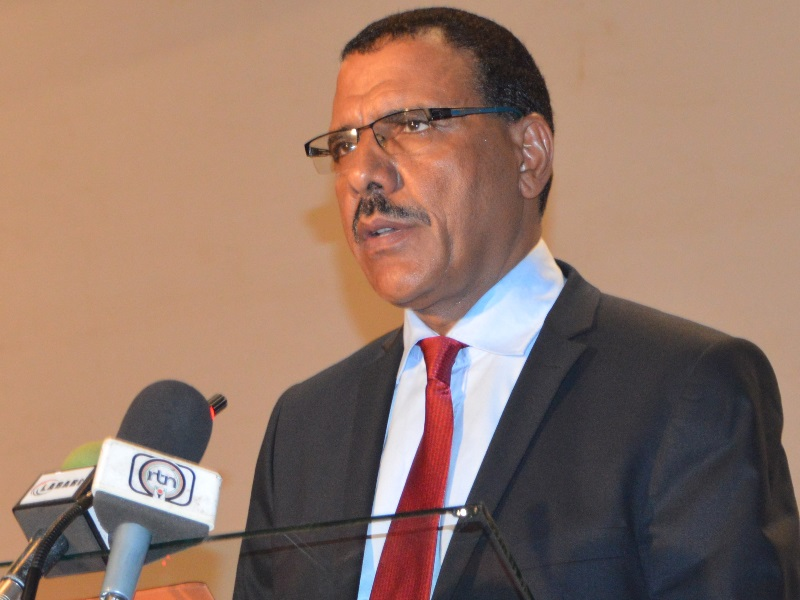
Mohamed Bazoum, who was President of Niger from 2021 until the 2023 coup

Early in the morning, the Nigerien presidency's Twitter account announced that presidential guards, commanded by Tiani (Note: Known as "Omar Tchiani" before his given name was given out in his public appearance following the coup.) engaged in an "anti-Republican demonstration" and tried "in vain" to obtain the support of the other security forces. It also said that Bazoum and his family were well after reports emerged that he was being held in the Presidential Palace in Niamey. Interior Minister Hamadou Souley was also arrested and held in the palace, while roughly 20 members of the presidential guard were spotted outside later in the day. The coup was reportedly led by Tiani, whom analysts said Bazoum had planned to relieve from his position. Sources close to Bazoum said that he had decided on Tiani's dismissal at a cabinet meeting on 24 July as their relations had reportedly become strained. Bazoum's wife Hadiza Bazoum and son Salem were detained with him at the presidential palace; his daughters were in Paris at the time of the coup.

Bazoum and his family were still in detention in mid-November 2023, reportedly with little food, water, or electricity.

==== Military mobilization ====
In the morning the palace and adjacent ministries were blocked off by military vehicles and palace staff were prevented from accessing their offices. Up to 400 civilian supporters of Bazoum tried to approach the palace but were dispersed by the presidential guard with gunfire, leaving one injured. Elsewhere in Niamey, the situation was described as calm. The presidency claimed that protests in support of Bazoum had occurred around the country's overseas diplomatic missions.

In response to these events, Niger's armed forces surrounded the presidential palace in support of Bazoum. The army issued a statement saying they had secured "major strategic points" in the country. The presidency stated that the army and the National Guard were ready to attack the presidential guard. The BBC reported that loyalist forces had surrounded the state broadcaster ORTN. The US embassy warned against travel along Niamey's Boulevard de la Republique, where the Presidential Palace was located.

==== Announcement of Bazoum's overthrow ====
In the evening, air force Colonel-Major Amadou Abdramane went on state television channel Télé Sahel to claim that Bazoum had been removed from power and announced the formation of a National Council for the Safeguard of the Homeland. One of the officers seen during the announcement was later identified as General Moussa Salaou Barmou, the head of the country's special forces.

Seated and flanked by nine other officers wearing uniforms representing all the different branches of the security forces, Abdramane said the defense and security forces had decided to topple the regime "due to the deteriorating security situation and bad governance." He also announced the dissolution of the country's constitution, the suspension of all state institutions, the closure of the country's borders and a nationwide curfew from 22:00 until 05:00 local time, while warning against any foreign intervention. The curfew was lifted on 4 August.

=== 27 July ===
==== Bazoum's response ====
In the morning, Bazoum tweeted that Nigeriens who love democracy would see to it that "hard-won gains will be safeguarded", indicating his refusal to step down from office. His foreign minister, Hassoumi Massaoudou, told France 24 that the country's "legal and legitimate power" remained with the president and reiterated that Bazoum was in good condition and that not the entire army was involved. Massaoudou declared himself acting head of state and called on all democrats to "make this adventure fail".

Despite being detained, Bazoum did not resign and was able to contact world leaders and officials such as French President Emmanuel Macron, UN Secretary-General António Guterres, AU Commissioner Moussa Faki, and US Secretary of State Antony Blinken. However, a former advisor to Bazoum who had been in contact with him said that the military was trying to wear him down by surrounding his residence with armored military vehicles, chaining the access gates shut and cutting the electricity supply. Subsequent reports indicated that he was suffering from bad health while in captivity.

==== Military recognition of the junta ====
The leadership of the Niger Armed Forces issued a statement signed by the army chief of staff, General Abdou Sidikou Issa, declaring its support for the coup. The statement mentioned the need to "preserve the physical integrity" of the president and his family and avoid "a deadly confrontation that could create a bloodbath and affect the security of the population."

In a television statement shortly after, Abdramane announced the suspension of all activities by political parties in the country until further notice. He also announced that the junta had issued a reprimand to France for violating the airspace closure after a military plane landed at an air base. Throughout the day, Télé Sahel continually broadcast the announcement of the junta's establishment with a few breaks in programming. The junta revoked military cooperation agreements with France, which had between 1,100 and 1,500 troops in the country.

A pro-coup demonstration took place with about 1,000 supporters of the junta flying Russian flags, voicing support for the Wagner Group, and throwing rocks at a passing politician's vehicle. The demonstrators denounced the French presence and that of other foreign bases. Other demonstrators gathered outside the headquarters of Bazoum's PNDS-Tarayya party, with footage showing them stoning and setting fire to vehicles. They ransacked and burned the premises, leading police to disperse them with tear gas. Demonstrations occurred in front of the National Assembly. This prompted the Interior Ministry in the evening to ban on all demonstrations with immediate effect. Civil servants were told to stay home.

=== 28 July ===
Tiani proclaimed himself as the president of the National Council for the Safeguard of the Homeland in an address on Télé Sahel. He said the coup was undertaken to avoid "the gradual and inevitable demise" of the country and said that Bazoum had tried to hide "the harsh reality" of the country, which he called "a pile of dead, displaced, humiliation and frustration". He also criticized the government's security strategy for its purported ineffectiveness and lack of collaboration with Mali and Burkina Faso but did not give a timeline for a return to civilian rule. His position as de facto concurrent head of state was later confirmed by Colonel Abdramane, who accused officials of Bazoum's government of plotting against the new regime while sheltering in foreign embassies and warned of bloodshed if they pushed through.

== Aftermath ==
Disruption within Niger following the coup continued, with demonstrations, censorship of broadcasts and interruptions to power supplies, as well as evacuations of foreign nationals. The situation escalated into a serious international crisis leading to threats of military intervention by ECOWAS and heightened tensions and military mobilization in Niger.

On 10 August, the junta declared a new government, naming 21 ministers led by Prime Minister Ali Lamine Zeine in an announcement on Télé Sahel by "secretary-general of the government" Mahamane Roufai Laouali. Three generals who were members of the CNSP were named to head the Interior, Defense and Sports ministries.

The heavy pressure from the international community and ECOWAS to hand over power, has prompted the junta to seek support from like-minded regimes in the region. On 2 August, a junta delegation headed by General Salifou Mody traveled to Bamako, Mali, and then to Ouagadougou, Burkina Faso. On 12 August, a delegation from the putschists, led by General Moussa Salaou Barmou, visited Conakry to ask Guinea for support and was received by the head of the Guinean junta, Mamadi Doumbouya.

On 13 August, the junta announced that it would prosecute Bazoum for "high treason" and "undermining the country's security". On 20 August, Tiani promised to return Niger to civilian rule within three years after meeting ECOWAS mediators in Niamey. On 22 August, the African Union suspended Niger from the bloc and told its members to avoid any action that might legitimize the junta. The junta gradually reopened Niger's borders, starting with crossings to Algeria, Burkina Faso, Mali, Libya, and Chad on 1 August, followed by its airspace on 4 September.

On 24 September, French President Emmanuel Macron announced France was pulling its troops as well as diplomatic staff, including its ambassador Sylvain Itté, from Niger by the end of 2023. Prior to this, Itté had defied the junta's demand for his expulsion, which led to a total blockade of the French embassy in Niamey. The international community's response to the coup was marked by a mix of sanctions and diplomatic efforts. While ECOWAS imposed sanctions and suspended Niger's membership, the African Union also suspended Niger from its activities. Western nations, including France and the United States, condemned the coup and suspended aid. In contrast, the junta sought to strengthen ties with non-Western partners, notably Russia, signaling a significant shift in Niger's foreign policy.

=== Impacts ===
The junta's actions, including detaining President Mohamed Bazoum and suppressing political opposition, drew widespread international condemnation. Despite ECOWAS's initial threats of military intervention, the bloc's response was limited, highlighting challenges in enforcing democratic norms among member states. In January 2024, Niger, along with Mali and Burkina Faso, withdrew from ECOWAS and formed the Alliance of Sahel States, aiming to bolster regional security cooperation and reduce reliance on Western partners. Some supporters of the junta view this move as a necessary step toward self-reliance, while others express concern over increasing political repression and reduced freedoms.

The coup exacerbated existing humanitarian crises in Niger. Sanctions and border closures led to shortages of essential goods, rising food prices, and increased displacement. Economically, the junta's policies, including the nationalization of certain industries and shifts in foreign alliances, led to reduced foreign investment and aid. However, new partnerships, particularly with Russia and China, were pursued to mitigate economic challenges.

Despite the military's justification of the coup as necessary to combat terrorism, attacks by armed groups linked to al-Qaeda and the Islamic State have persisted, particularly in the Tillabéri and Diffa regions. Civilians have faced ongoing violence, and some reports indicate that extremist groups have exploited instability to expand their influence. There have also been reports of abuses by the military, including crackdowns on perceived dissenters and allegations of extrajudicial killings.

== Reactions ==
=== Domestic ===
In the immediate aftermath of the coup, thousands of Nigeriens rallied in support of the military junta. Demonstrations in Niamey featured participants waving Nigerien and Russian flags, chanting slogans against France and ECOWAS. Some protesters expressed hope that the new leadership would restore national sovereignty and reduce foreign interference. A year after the coup, public opinion remained divided. While some citizens continued to support the junta, others grew disillusioned by ongoing economic difficulties and concerns about governance. An Al Jazeera feature detailed how political loyalties strained familial relationships, with one resident noting, "In my own family, we no longer talk politics because it leads to arguments". This underscores the nuanced and evolving nature of public sentiment in Niger.

Niger's governing political coalition denounced the coup as "a suicidal and anti-republican madness", while the opposition coalition expressed support for the military's grievances but disapproved of any political changes through force. Two deputy officials of Bazoum's cabinet, Daouda Takoubakoye and Oumar Moussa, said Tiani's statements on the coup were "lies" and accused him and the presidential guard of staging the coup for "personal gain". Bazoum's Prime Minister, Ouhoumoudou Mahamadou, who was in Europe at the time of the coup, also expressed his support for Bazoum and welcomed the imposition of sanctions by ECOWAS on the military junta as "very satisfactory and logical", while insisting that anti-French demonstrations in Niamey did not represent the Nigerien people as a whole.

Bazoum's predecessor as president, Mahamadou Issoufou, as well as other former leaders were said to have been involved in initial negotiations to release Bazoum and have the presidential guards stand down. In 2026, Nigerien exiles in Europe established the Alliance des Démocrates du Sahel, which advocates for the restoration of constitutional rule and civilian government in Niger, led by Mariama Djibrine.

=== International ===
The coup was condemned by the World Bank, the African Union, ECOWAS, the United Nations, Algeria, the European Union, France, and the United States; several of them, as well as the United Nations High Commissioner for Human Rights Volker Türk called for Bazoum's immediate release. On 2 August, the World Bank suspended disbursements to Niger.

On 30 July, ECOWAS gave Niger's coup leaders a one-week deadline to hand power back to Bazoum or to face international sanctions and/or use of force. On the same day, ECOWAS leaders said they would immediately enforce a no-fly zone over the country for all commercial flights, and a closure of borders with Niger. A series of sanctions was also announced, including the suspension of all commercial and financial transactions between its member states and Niger and the freezing of assets and travel restrictions for military personnel involved in the coup. A planned 30 billion CFA franc ($51 million) bond issuance by Niger scheduled for 31 July in the West African regional debt market was cancelled by the Central Bank of West African States. Following the expiration of its deadline on Bazoum's restoration, ECOWAS ordered the "immediate activation" of its intervention force but said it still favors a peaceful resolution to the crisis. On 18 August, ECOWAS said it had agreed an undisclosed "D-Day" for a possible military intervention to restore democracy in Niger if diplomatic efforts fail, stressing that it would not hold endless dialogue with the junta.

Benin President Patrice Talon called the coup a "military misbehavior". Kenyan President William Ruto called the coup a "serious setback" for Africa. South Africa also condemned and called on the junta to ensure Bazoum's safety and urgently return to constitutional rule.

The United States formally referred to the coup as "an effort to seize power by force and to disrupt the constitution," stopping short of describing it as a coup, as doing so would entail a withdrawal of economic aid and military assistance, including existing drone and military bases, to the nation. It expressed support for ECOWAS and warned the junta against harming Bazoum and those detained with him, stressing that it would hold them responsible for such an action. On 15 August, a Pentagon spokesperson referred to the events as an "attempted coup".

The Chinese foreign ministry expressed support for Bazoum and called for a diplomatic resolution to the crisis but did not directly condemn the coup or refer to the event as one. The EU and France withheld financial and development aid to Niger and suspended all security cooperation agreements with the country. France stated that it continued to recognize Bazoum as the "sole president" of Niger. Yevgeny Prigozhin, the head Wagner Group that has operated in Mali and supplanted France in combating Mali's jihadist insurgency, praised the coup and called it part of Niger's fight against its "colonizers." Prigozhin's statements contrasted with the official line given by the Russian government, with President Vladimir Putin's spokesperson Dmitry Peskov calling the coup a "serious concern" and calling for all sides "to show restraint" and for "the fastest possible return to legal order," while subsequently criticizing intervention by non-regional forces as "ineffective." Mykhailo Podolyak, an adviser to Ukrainian President Volodymyr Zelenskyy, alleged that Russia was behind the coup in Niger.

Human Rights Watch called on the Nigerien military to provide a clear timeline for a return to civilian rule and uphold citizens' rights to democratic elections. The AU also demanded that the military return to barracks in 15 days and restore civilian rule following a meeting of its Peace and Security Council. The UN announced that it had suspended its humanitarian operations in the country, but later clarified that it was still delivering aid to Niger but was not in contact with the military. The military junta of Myanmar expressed support for the coup.

== Analysis ==
Cameron Hudson, a senior associate of the Center for Strategic and International Studies, said that the coup could impact Niger's fight against the Islamist insurgency, adding that there were indications that the Nigerien military was not pleased with the level of support they received to fight militants. Ulf Laessing, head of the Sahel program at the Konrad Adenauer Foundation, said the coup was a "nightmare" for the West, which counted on Bazoum and Niger as its "new security anchor" in the region. Flavien Baumgartner, an Africa analyst at the security and political risk consultancy Dragonfly, said that Bazoum's removal could lead to the Wagner Group expanding into Niger, given that the country is an important producer of uranium. Russian political scientist Andrey Korotayev described the coup as a "coupvolution", noting its support from the political opposition in Niger.

At the time of the coup, a major oil pipeline that would be the longest in Africa at 1,980 kilometers in length was under construction. It would connect the oil fields of the Agadem oasis, in the Erg of Bilma, in Diffa, Niger with the Port Seme Terminal in Benin. By October 2022, 30% of the pipeline was complete. Benin authorities commented that the sanctions imposed on Niger by ECOWAS after the coup, although they did not stop construction work, could mean a significant delay. The Trans-Saharan gas pipeline connecting Europe and Nigeria was still being planned at the time of the coup.

The coup is seen by the International Crisis Group as encouraging for jihadists, as the coups in Mali and Burkina Faso were followed by intensified jihadist violence, according to ACLED data. Academic Taiwo Adeagbo asserts that the coup had ethnic backing; Niger's majority ethnic group, the Hausa people, were not supportive of Bazoum due to his Arab Ouled Slimane origin and became loyalists of Tiani because he was from the majority ethnic group. Professor Joseph Chinedu Ofobuike wrote that Bazoum was viewed with suspicion and even as a "foreigner" because of his ethnicity. The coup was perceived as bringing back power to the "natives".
