= Slavery in contemporary Africa =

Modern history of slavery in Africa

The continent of Africa is one of the regions most rife with contemporary slavery. Slavery in Africa has a long history within Africa since before historical records, but intensifying with the trans-Saharan and Indian Ocean slave trade and again with the trans-Atlantic and Barbary slave trade. The demand for slaves created an entire series of kingdoms which existed in a state of perpetual warfare in order to generate the prisoners of war necessary for the lucrative export of slaves. These patterns persisted into the colonial period during the late 19th and early 20th century. Although the colonial authorities attempted to suppress slavery around 1900, their attempts were largely ineffective. Even after decolonization, slavery continues in many parts of Africa despite being officially illegal.

Slavery in the Sahel region (and to a lesser extent the Horn of Africa) exists along the racial and cultural boundary of Arabized Berbers in the north and darker Africans in the south. Slavery in the Sahel states of Mauritania, Mali, Niger, Chad and Sudan in particular, continues a centuries-old pattern of hereditary servitude. Other forms of traditional slavery exist in parts of Ghana, Benin, Togo and Nigeria. There are other, non-traditional forms of slavery in Africa today, mostly involving human trafficking and the enslavement of child soldiers and child labourers, e.g. human trafficking in Angola, and human trafficking of children from Togo, Benin and Nigeria to Gabon and Cameroon.

Modern day slavery in Africa according to the Anti-Slavery Society includes exploitation of subjugate populations even when their condition is not technically called "slavery":

Although this exploitation is often not called slavery, the conditions are the same. People are sold like objects, forced to work for little or no pay and are at the mercy of their "employers".

— Antislavery Society, What is Modern Slavery?

Forced labor in Sub-Saharan Africa is estimated at 660,000. This includes people involved in the illegal diamond mines of Sierra Leone and Liberia, which is also a direct result of the civil wars in these regions. In 2017, the International Labour Office estimated that 7 in every 1,000 people in Africa are victims of slavery.

== Types of contemporary slavery ==
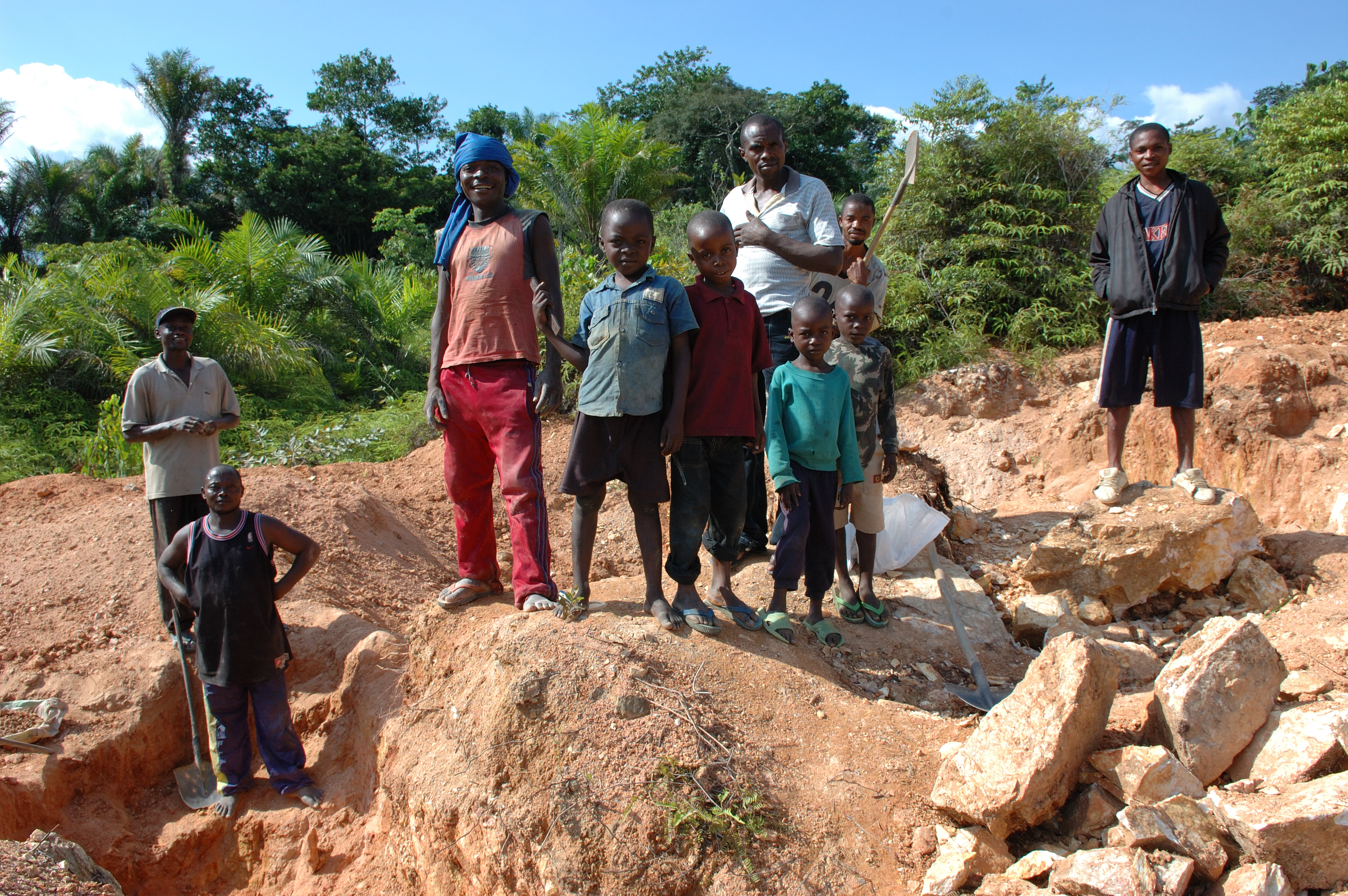
Hereditary slavery and corporate child labor in Africa

=== Sex trade ===
While institutional slavery has been banned worldwide, there are numerous reports of female sex slaves in areas without an effective government control, such as Sudan and Liberia, Sierra Leone, northern Uganda, Congo, Niger and Mauritania. In Ghana, Togo, and Benin, a form of (forced) religious prostitution known as trokosi ("ritual servitude") forcibly keeps thousands of girls and women in traditional shrines as "wives of the gods", where priests perform the sexual function in place of the gods.

=== Forced labour ===
Forced labor, which can be different from slavery, is defined as any work or services which people are forced to do against their will under the threat of some form of punishment. In the Democratic Republic of the Congo, the Pygmy peoples are usually victims of their Bantu neighbors, who have replaced the positions once held by Arabs and Europeans.

We must work for the Bantu masters. We cannot refuse to do so because we are likely to be beaten or be victims of insults and threats. Even though we agree to work all day in the fields, we are still asked to work even more, for example, to fetch firewood or go hunting. Most of the time, they pay us in kind, a worn loincloth for 10 workdays. We cannot refuse because we do not have a choice.

— Antislavery Society, Interview with an indigenous man in the Congo

=== Child slave trade ===
The trading of children has been reported in modern Nigeria and Benin. The children are kidnapped or purchased for $20–70 each by slavers in poorer states, such as Benin and Togo, and sold into slavery in sex dens or as unpaid domestic servants for $350 each in wealthier oil-rich states, such as Nigeria and Gabon.

In April 2014, Boko Haram kidnapped 276 female students from Chibok, Borno. More than 50 of them soon escaped, but the remainder have not been released. Instead, the leader of Boko Haram, Abubakar Shekau, who has a reward of $7 million offered by the United States Department of State since June 2013 for information leading to his capture, announced his intention of selling them into slavery.

=== Ritual slavery ===
Ritual servitude (Trokosi) is a practice in Ghana, Togo, and Benin where traditional religious shrines take human beings, usually young virgin girls, in payment for services, or in religious atonement for alleged misdeeds of a family member—almost always a female. In Ghana and in Togo, it is practiced by the Ewe people in the Volta Region, and in Benin, it is practiced by the Fon.

== Slavery by country ==
=== Chad ===
The practice of slavery in Chad, as in the Sahel states in general, is an entrenched phenomenon with a long history, going back to the trans-Saharan slave trade in the Sahelian kingdoms, and it continues today. As elsewhere in Central and West Africa, the situation reflects an ethnic, racial and religious rift. IRIN (Integrated Regional Information Networks) of the UN Office for the Coordination of Humanitarian Affairs reports children being sold to Arab herdsmen in Chad by their parents due to poverty.

=== Congo ===
Debt bondage-like slavery is rife in parts of Congo. According to the Global Slavery Index, approximately, over one million people are enslaved in the region of the Democratic Republic of Congo.

=== Ethiopia ===
Mahider Bitew, Children's Rights and Protection expert at the Ministry of Women's Affairs, says that some remote studies conducted in Dire Dawa, Shashemene, Awassa, and three other towns of the country indicate that the problem of child trafficking is very serious. According to a 2003 study, about one thousand children were trafficked via Dire Dawa to countries of the Middle East. The majority of those children were girls, most of whom were forced to be prostitutes after leaving the country. The International Labour Organization has identified prostitution as the worst form of child labor.

In Ethiopia, children are trafficked into prostitution, to provide cheap or unpaid labor, and to work as domestic servants or beggars. The ages of these children are usually between 10 and 18, and their trafficking is from the country to urban centers and from cities to the country. Boys are often expected to work in activities such as herding cattle in rural areas and in the weaving industry in Addis Ababa and other major towns. Girls are expected to take responsibilities for domestic chores, childcare, and looking after the sick, and to work as prostitutes.

=== Ghana, Togo, Benin ===
In parts of Ghana among the Ewe people, a family may be punished for an offense by having to turn over a virgin female to serve as a sex slave within the offended family. In this instance, the woman does not gain the title of "wife". In parts of Ghana, Togo, and Benin, shrine slavery persists, despite being illegal in Ghana since 1998. This system of slavery is sometimes called trokosi (in Ghana), or voodoosi in Togo and Benin, or ritual servitude. Young virgin girls are given as slaves in traditional shrines and are used sexually by the priests, in addition to providing free labor for the shrine.

Many Chinese prostitutes are trafficked to Ghana to service expatriate communities in the country, the Enslavement Protection Alliance-West Africa (EPAWA) investigations reveal. The Accra-based non-governmental organization told Citi Newsroom that victims are recruited under the guise of working as restaurant assistants. They are then confined and forced to provide sexual services.

=== Madagascar ===
Domestic servitude and forced labor are a continuing problem and increasing as a result of exacerbated poverty in Madagascar, according to a 2012 mission by the United Nations Special Rapporteur for contemporary forms of slavery. The UN Special Rapporteur identified children as particularly vulnerable and was particularly concerned about the enslavement of youth in mining and sexual exploitation or servile marriages.

=== Mali ===
Slavery continues to exist in Mali in all ethnic groups of the country but particularly among the Tuareg communities. The French formally abolished slavery in 1905, but many slaves remained with their masters until 1946 when large emancipation activism occurred. The first government of independent Mali tried to end slavery, but these efforts were undermined with the military dictatorship from 1968 until 1991. Slavery persists today with thousands of people still held in servitude; however, an active social movement called Temedt (which won the 2012 Anti-Slavery International award) has been pressuring the government for ending slavery in the country.

Although the Malian government denies that slavery continues, National Geographic writer Kira Salak claimed in 2002 that slavery was quite conspicuous and that she herself bought and then freed two slaves in Timbuktu. In addition, with the 2012 Tuareg Rebellion, there are reports of ex-slaves being recaptured by their former masters.

=== Mauritania ===
According to the Global Security Index Mauritania has one of the highest rates of vulnerability to slavery, ranking at number 4 in the region. A system exists now by which Arab Muslims—the bidanes—own black slaves, the haratines. An estimated 90,000 Mauritanians remain essentially enslaved. The ruling bidanes (the name means literally white-skinned people) are descendants of the Sanhaja Berbers and Beni Hassan Arab tribes who emigrated to northwest Africa and present-day Western Sahara and Mauritania during the Middle Ages. According to some estimates, up to 600,000 Mauritanians, or 20% of the population, are still enslaved, many of them used as bonded labour. Slavery in Mauritania was criminalized in August 2007. Malouma Messoud, a former Muslim slave has explained her enslavement to a religious leader:

"We didn't learn this history in school; we simply grew up within this social hierarchy and lived it. Slaves believe that if they do not obey their masters, they will not go to paradise. They are raised in a social and religious system that everyday reinforces this idea."

In Mauritania, despite slave ownership having been banned by law in 1981, hereditary slavery continues. Moreover, according to Amnesty International:

Not only has the government denied the existence of slavery and failed to respond to cases brought to its attention, it has hampered the activities of organizations which are working on the issue, including by refusing to grant them official recognition.

Imam El Hassan Ould Benyamin of Tayarat in 1997 expressed his views about earlier proclamations ending slavery in his country as follows:

[it] is contrary to the teachings of the fundamental text of Islamic law, the Quran ... [and] amounts to the expropriation from Muslims of their goods; goods that were acquired legally. The state, if it is Islamic, does not have the right to seize my house, my wife or my slave.

Biram Dah Abeid, often called the Mauritanian Nelson Mandela, "Le Spartacus Mauritanien", an anti-slavery activist and member of the Haratin ethnic group in Mauritania argues that

there is a kind of informal coalition – Beydanes [the slave owning caste], the state, police, judges, and imams – that prevents slaves from leaving their masters. "Whenever a slave breaks free while IRA [his antislavery group] is not aware and not present, police officers and judges help Arab-Berbers to intimidate the slave until he returns in submission".

Biram, along with 16 other activists, since 11 November 2014, is awaiting trial in Mauritania on multiple charges which include "violating public order" and "offending the authorities".

The story of Biram Dah Abeid, a prominent anti-slavery activist on trial, illustrates the troubled history and continued prevalence of slavery in Mauritania. Yet, Mauritanian human rights campaigners remain hopeful and believe that the trial will ultimately lead to positive long-term changes.

=== Niger ===
Niger continues to have significant problems with three forms of contemporary slavery: hereditary slavery, what Anti-Slavery International terms "passive slavery", and servile marriages called wahaya. Because of the continued problem of slavery and pressure from the Timidria organization, Niger became the first country in Western Africa to pass a law specifically criminalizing slavery. Despite the law, slavery persists throughout the different ethnic groups of the country, women are particularly vulnerable, and a 2002 census confirmed the existence of 43,000 slaves and estimated that the total population could be over 870,000 people. In a landmark case in 2008, the Economic Community of West African States (ECOWAS) Community Court of Justice found the government of Niger responsible for continuing a woman's slave status as part of a wahaya marriage and awarded her US$21,500.

=== Sudan ===
Sudan has seen a resurgence of slavery since 1983, associated with the Second Sudanese Civil War. Estimates of abductions range from 14,000 to 200,000 people.

In Sudan, animist and Christian captives in the civil war are often enslaved, and female prisoners are often used sexually, with their Muslim captors claiming that Islamic law grants them permission. According to CBS News, slaves have been sold for $50 per person. In 2001, CNN reported that the Bush administration was under pressure from Congress, including conservative Christians concerned about religious oppression and slavery, to address issues involved in the Sudanese conflict. CNN has also quoted the U.S. State Department's allegations: "The [Sudanese] government's support of slavery and its continued military action which has resulted in numerous deaths are due in part to the victims' religious beliefs."

Jok Madut Jok, professor of History at Loyola Marymount University, states that the abduction of women and children of the south by north is slavery by any definition. The government of Sudan insists that the whole matter is no more than the traditional tribal feuding over resources.

=== South Africa ===
Despite significant efforts made by the South African Government to combat trafficking in persons, the country has been placed on the "Tier 2 Watch List" by the U.S. Department of Trafficking in Persons for the past four years. South Africa shares borders with Namibia, Botswana, Zimbabwe, Lesotho, Mozambique and Eswatini. It has 72 official ports of entry "and a number of unofficial ports of entry where people come in and out without being detected" along its 5 000 km-long land borderline. The problem of porous borders is compounded by the lack of adequately trained employees, resulting in few police officials controlling large portions of the country's coastline.

== See also ==
- Abolition of slavery timeline
- History of slavery
- Sexual slavery in contemporary Africa
- Slavery in Africa
