= List of Nigeriens =

This is a list of notable people from Niger:

== Leaders and politicians ==
=== Modern ===
- Hama Amadou, former Prime Minister
- Kalla Ankourao, former minister
- Djibo Bakary, colonial premier and Sawaba party leader
- Bibata Niandou Barry lawyer and minister
- Jeannette Schmidt Degener (1926–2017), businesswoman, feminist and politician
- Hamani Diori, first President
- Mahamadou Issoufou, present Leader of the Opposition, former prime minister
- Ibrahim Baré Maïnassara, President, 1996–1999
- Mamadou Tandja, President, 1999–2010
- Hadizatou Mani, human rights advocate
- Ibrahim Hassane Mayaki, former prime minister
- Mamane Oumarou, Prime Minister, 1983 & 1989
- Mahamane Ousmane, President, 1993–1996
- Ali Saibou, President, 1987–1993
- André Salifou, professor and opposition leader
- Ilguilas Weila
- Seyni Oumarou, present prime minister
- Ousmane Issoufou Oubandawaki, former Minister of National Defence, former Minister of Transports, former Director General of ASECNA

==== Not served or opposition ====
- Rhissa Ag Boula

==== Military Leaders ====
- Seyni Kountché, military officer, President 1974–1987
- Général Ali Saïbou, military officer, President 1987–1992
- Daouda Malam Wanké, military officer, President 1999–2000

== Journalist ==
- Grémah Boucar - journalist.
- Moussa Kaka - director Maradi based radio station Saraounia FM.
- Mariama Keïta - journalist and feminist activists
- Rahmatou Keïta - journalist and film director
- Nouhou Arzika - journalist and civil rights activists
- Samira Sabou - journalist and blogger
- Moussa Tchangari - journalist and civil society leader
- Tchima Illa Issoufou - correspondent for BBC Hausa.

== Religious figures ==
- Sarraounia: Mauri religious leader
- Ambroise Ouédraogo: Roman Catholic Archbishop of Maradi

== Other ==
- Kadidjatou Amadou, disability activist, paralympian and social entrepreneur
- Lucien Bouchardeau, FIFA football referee
- Ibrahim Chaibou, FIFA football referee and match fixer
- Emaniel Djibril Dankawa, nakke
- Mariam Issoufou, architect

== See also ==
- List of Nigerien writers
- List of people by nationality
