= Descent-based slavery =

Type of slavery based on ancestry

Descent-based slavery is a form of slavery based on the assignment of a so-called hereditary "slave status". Although slavery has been officially abolished by law, stigmatisation and discrimination based on genealogy persist locally.

This phenomenon, rooted in history, still affects many people today, particularly in West Africa (Mali, Niger, Mauritania, Burkina Faso, Nigeria, Senegal). Slavery by descent is present in most of the ethnic groups of the Western Sahel, particularly in the Tuareg, Moorish, Hausa, Soninke and Fulani communities.

"Slave" status is generally transmitted through the maternal line. Even after the official abolition of slavery by most of the colonial powers in Africa and right up to the present day, many people are still considered to be "descendants of slaves", on the grounds that one of their ancestors was enslaved.

However, this group often also includes people who were never literally enslaved in the past, but who were assigned the social status of foreigners by village chiefs when they arrived, and who were only allowed to marry descendants of enslaved people, so that these "foreign migrants" are socially inserted into the "descendants of slaves" status group.

== Definition ==
Anti-Slavery International defines descent-based slavery as the situation where an individual is "born into slavery" because their ancestors were captured and enslaved and their families have "belonged" to "slave-owning" families ever since.

In terms of terminology, it is important to prefer the terms "enslaved", "considered to be a descendant of a slave", "locally assigned the status of a descendant of a slave", in order to avoid essentializing these categories, which are social rather than biological constructs. The activists themselves are fighting against the use of the term "slave".

== History ==
The phenomenon of slavery and internal trafficking preceded the transatlantic slave trade, although the latter reinforced the importance of trafficking in West African economies. People captured during wars or raids were enslaved, kept locally or sold to finance other wars.

In the 19th century, the phenomenon of internal slavery in West Africa grew in importance, with the increase in local conflicts, while the outlet for the Atlantic slave trade gradually closed as a result of the transatlantic abolitions. The abolitions and the fall in demand for slaves outside the continent made access to slave ownership possible for many sections of the population. The conversion of West Africa into a plantation economy, the "legitimate trade", particularly in coastal areas during the colonial period, relied essentially on the labour of enslaved people.

As "slave" status was mainly transmitted through the maternal line, this led to the creation of an endogamous class that could be exploited at will by the local elites. Freedom could be bought back, but this was rare. Some victims of descent-based slavery do not have ancestors who were captured and reduced to slavery, but were assigned this status after migrating to a new community. The children of a "slave" concubine and a "noble" man are generally free if the father recognises them, but do not have a status strictly equivalent to that of the children of free wives.

The internal slave trade was officially abolished during French colonisation of French West Africa in 1905, which led a number of slaves to leave their former "masters ". The history of descent-based slavery is linked to the history of internal migration, whether forced or voluntary, and whether or not it led to emancipation. Nevertheless, abolition did not always lead to the actual emancipation of those still assigned "slave" status: the colonial authorities only partially applied the new laws, and practices of slavery by descent continued in a more or less concealed form.

== Contemporary situation ==
Practices directly linked to the slave-owning past are still perpetrated today and form part of what is known as descent-based slavery.

These practices can be found in most communities in the Sahel (Mali, Niger, Burkina Faso, Mauritania, Nigeria, Cameroon, Chad, Sudan and Senegal).

People considered locally as "descendants of slaves" face discrimination and abuse. They are sometimes forced to work without pay, denied access to education and civil status documents, and excluded from public office.

Refusal to accept the status of "slave" in the face of those who consider themselves to be their "masters" leads to sanctions in the villages where the people concerned live: victims of descent-based slavery who refuse their status are exposed to physical violence, and may be denied access to essential resources such as water, land and necessary consumer goods (embargo).

Slavery by descent consequently leads to forced migration, which is not very visible and is invisible. Historically, these migrations have accompanied resistance and movements to escape slavery, to found autonomous communities, or to cities or neighbouring countries.

In the Kayes region, which has been particularly hard hit by this phenomenon, more than 3,000 victims of descent-based slavery have had to leave their villages since 2018. Until 2021, the Malian authorities did not recognise the existence of victims of descent-based slavery in the region, and considered that the people concerned were simply taking part in "traditional" cultural practices, which had to be respected in order to preserve social cohesion.

Slavery by descent is a "public secret" in the villages concerned, in a society that is generally reluctant to listen to what the victims have to say. The "ideology of slavery", which can be defined as "a cultural system that justifies and legitimises a social order based on a social hierarchy inherited from slavery" persists today, prompting certain members of the political and economic elite who might be categorised as "descendants of slaves" to remain silent about their origins. People considered locally as "descendants of slaves" are particularly vulnerable to other forms of modern slavery. The practices of " fostering " (placing a child in the care of another family), marriage and domestic service may conceal situations of modern slavery under the guise of legality.

== Legislation ==
Legislation explicitly criminalising practices linked to descent-based slavery has existed in Niger since 2003 and in Mauritania since 2015. The Guinean constitution of 2020 prohibits slavery, human trafficking and forced labour (article 7), but these provisions were not included in the transitional charter of 27 September 2021.

There is no specific law criminalising descent-based slavery in Mali, although the Constitution affirms the equality of all Malian nationals and the country is a signatory to several international conventions against slavery and trafficking (guaranteeing the right to life and freedom). Since 2006, a coalition of Malian human rights organisations has been lobbying for the adoption of a law criminalising descent-based slavery. A draft law was drawn up but never passed, being relegated to second place in 2016 by other government priorities, notably security. The absence of such a law makes it difficult to appeal to the courts, not to mention other judicial malfunctions and corruption. A number of anti-slavery activists and organisations also stress the importance of adopting such a law, even though they know that its effective application is likely to be long and complex.

== Resistance to descent-based slavery ==
Resistance to descent-based slavery and its consequences has existed throughout the history of this phenomenon, leading in particular to the foundation of free autonomous communities. The village of Bouillagui, in the Kayes region, is a good example. In the same region, and particularly in and around the town of Kayes, people who have fled slavery are called "djambourou", which is synonymous with "Freedom". The origins of this term are unclear. It is possible that it comes from the Wolof term "diambour", which means "free peasant". This term would have travelled to West Africa with the French colonial conquest of Mauritania, Mali and as far as the Ivory Coast from Senegal. It would have referred to the inhabitants of the villages of freedom, founded by the French colonial administration to take in slaves fleeing their masters, but systematically recruited for forced labour by the colonial authorities. Today, the term has acquired a pejorative connotation in Kayes (Mali), denigrating these people as "vagabonds", "unattached", "uncivilised", "rebels to authority". When used to insult a female person, it even means "prostitute".

The traumas associated with exile, family separation and the persistence of stigma into contemporary generations fuel the fight against descent-based slavery. Various strategies exist to combat the stigma attached to victims of descent-based slavery: these strategies range from concealing the assigned status (often facilitated by migration) to challenging it.

Social movements led by people assigned "slave" status now exist in almost all the countries of French-speaking West Africa. The Soninke diaspora is heavily involved in the fight against descent-based slavery, notably through the "Gambana" movement (a slogan meaning "equality"), operating mainly in Senegal, Gambia, Mauritania and Mali. Social networks play a decisive role in the fight against descent-based slavery. The Gambana WhatsApp groups are currently followed by more than 70,000 people in Africa and the diaspora. In Mali, several associations are fighting against descent-based slavery, including RMFP Gambana (Rassemblement malien pour la Fraternité et le Progrès), which is the national branch of the international Ganbanaaxun Fedde movement. Major demonstrations against slavery took place in Kayes in 2020 (in reaction to the death of four Malian activists, beaten to death on the orders of local slave elites in Djandjoumé, western Mali), and in 2022 following the murder of Djogou Sidibé, who had refused to be assigned "slave status". The community of Malian bloggers also launched the #MaliSansEsclaves campaign in 2019.

Other associations are active elsewhere in West Africa, including Semme Allah in Benin, SOS Esclaves in Mauritania, Timidria in Niger, etc.

== Gender, age and descent-based slavery ==
The majority of those enslaved before abolition were women, and the majority left their "masters'" villages after abolition. Female and juvenile labour was therefore in great demand, particularly among "noble" women, who turned to the family network. The system of confiage expanded in the twenty years following abolition. Questions of child custody after the father's death, or the recovery of a former "slave" child, were often submitted to the courts, because of the economic stakes involved. The emancipation of slaves also meant regaining control over their own families, which the courts rarely guaranteed in the absence of financial compensation to the former "master". The boundaries between trust, pledging one person for the debts of another, child labour and forced marriage became permeable and perpetuated the hierarchies of slavery.

Young girls from poor families who have been assigned the status of "slaves" are still often victims of forced marriage under the wahaya system (Islamic concubinage): they are not considered legitimate wives and suffer social isolation, economic and sexual exploitation (as in the case of the movement of concubines from Niger to northern Nigeria). There is sometimes a return migration to the region of origin, but the socio-economic situation of these women generally remains precarious.

Those considered as "slaves" are particularly vulnerable to modern slavery (the case of "petites bonnes" in Mali).

== Islam and descent-based slavery ==
People assigned "slave" status may face restrictions on their practice of the Muslim religion: the widowhood of a woman considered to be a "slave" is shorter; fathers of families are not allowed to slaughter animals for the feast of Tabaski and must butcher the animal in the family of those considered to be their former "masters".

Certain documents signed by the kadis ratified the liberation of a person categorised as a "slave" (manumission). In a pre-abolitionist Islamic context, manumission was a legal form of emancipation. Manumission gave access to certain Islamic privileges, such as receiving a new name and passing on an inheritance, but established a clientelistic relationship between the former "master" and the former "slave", who did not become free in the same way as the former master, but rather "freed". It was therefore not a question of total emancipation. As the colonial decrees abolishing slavery were only weakly applied by the administrations and courts, slavery and the practice of manumission persisted in certain areas. Recourse to manumission most often concerned the oldest members of the franche who were assigned slave status, a practice that was sometimes denounced as naïve, backward-looking or even as "treachery to one's class". In their journey towards emancipation and to free themselves from social stigma, other strategies are used to a greater extent, to challenge, circumvent or ignore these social boundaries.

Various interpretations of Islam coexist with regard to slavery. Islam is often used by political and religious elites to maintain the status quo of slavery and descent-based slavery. On the other hand, resistance movements such as IRA Mauritania and Gambana invoke Muhammad's liberation of slaves and consider slavery practices to be illegitimate in an Islamic context.
