= Slavery in Niger =

Slavery has been practiced in the Sahel region for many centuries and persists to this day. The Bornu Empire in the eastern part of Niger was an active part of the trans-Saharan slave trade for hundreds of years. Other ethnic groups in the country similarly had a history of slavery, although this varied and in some places slavery was largely limited to the political and economic elite.

When the French took control of the area, they largely ignored the problem and only actively banned the trade in slaves but not the practices of slavery. Following independence, many of the major slave holders became prominent political leaders in both the multiparty democracy period and the military dictatorship (1974 until 1991), and so the problem of slavery was largely ignored. In 2003, with pressure from the anti-slavery organization Timidria, Niger passed the first law in Western Africa that criminalized slavery as a specific crime. Despite this, slavery persists throughout the different ethnic groups in the country, women are particularly vulnerable, and a 2002 census confirmed the existence of 43,000 slaves and estimated that the total slave population could be over 870,000 people. The landmark Mani v. Niger case was one of the first instances where a person won a judgement against the government of Niger in an international court for sanctioning her slave status in official decisions.

== Historical practices ==
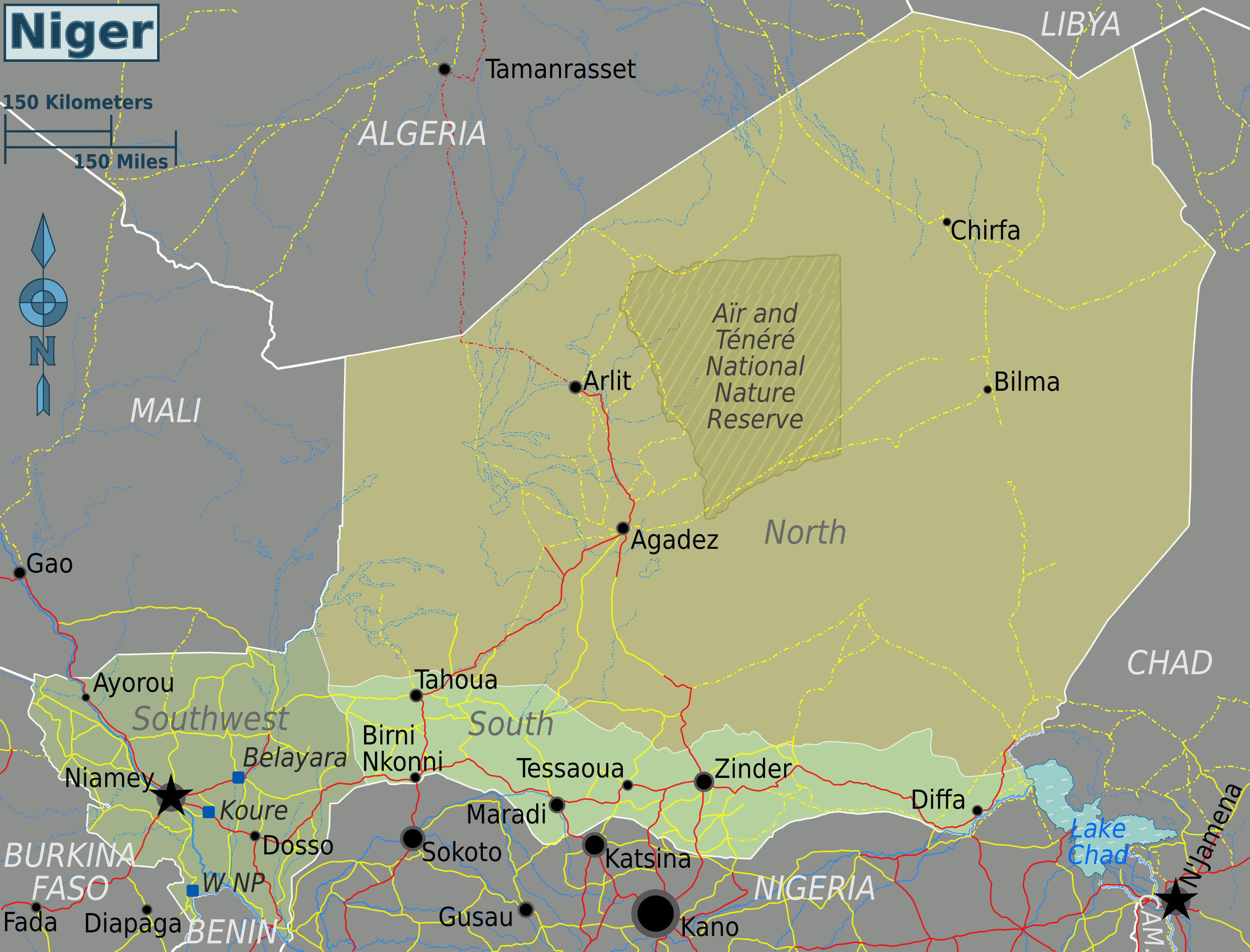
Map of Niger

Slavery existed throughout what is today Niger and the region played a pivotal role in the trans-Saharan slave trade for many centuries. In some ethnic groups, slavery became a significant phenomenon and made up a large part of the population and the economic production and trade. In other areas, slavery remained small and were only held by the elite in the communities. However, since political leaders often were slave-holders, they presented a significant hurdle for French authorities when they colonized the area and in post-independence Niger.

=== Bornu ===
Much of the east of present-day Niger was involved in a significant part of the trans-Saharan slave trade with a route starting in Kano and traveling through the rugged Aïr Mountains. The Bornu Empire centered along this route became a prominent participant in the Trans-Saharan slave trade prior to the Fulani jihad (1804–1808) to the east and the movement of Tuareg into the Aïr region in the 1800s. The trade through Bornu was small-scale for many centuries but remained steady before reaching its peak in the 1500s.

Starting in the 1600s, the Jukun confederation, a collection of pagan peoples, began challenging the Bornu empire. The result was a series of retaliatory slave raids between the two powers with each feeding the slave trade to the coast (the West African slave market for the Jukun and the North African markets for Bornu).

With the decline of the Bornu empire in the 17th and 18th centuries, slaves became a more significant part of the domestic economy with the creation of both slave villages and slave plantations throughout the empire. This occurred both because of the rise of the Sokoto Caliphate in the 1800s which increased the agricultural trade and introduced large-scale slave plantations to the region and as a result of exorbitant taxes leveled by the Bornu authorities which caused free people in the empire to purchase slaves to increase output and pay taxes.

In terms of domestic use, agricultural work figured the most prominently. Women were the highest valued domestically, to a large part because of cultural practices which dictated that only first generation slaves could earn their freedom, and that the children of slaves never could become free. As a result, women of child bearing age, whose children would all be slaves for life, were particularly valuable.

=== Other areas of Niger ===
Beginning in the 18th century but particularly in the 19th century, the Sultanate of Damagaram, located in the present-day city of Zinder, became a political rival to the Bornu empire. Damagaram was successful because it built a large, mobile army able to protect trade routes and because they made alliances with the Tuareg leaders who had now become the primary power in the Aïr Mountains. With these alliances, Zinder became a major power along the trans-Saharan trade route from Kano to Tripoli and Cairo. Zinder combined populations from the Kanuri (the major ethnic group of the Bornu empire), the Hausa, and the Tuareg and as a result developed slave practices which borrowed from all three to create a large slave population and varied institutions of slavery. There were thus large populations of domestic and agricultural slaves, borrowed from Kanuri customs, the development of plantation slavery, from Hausa practice, and the development of separate slave communities, from Tuareg practice. Slaves were not the only export commodity from the Sultanate, but were crucial parts of the overall economic structure. As the Sultanate increased in power, the Sultan began to replace nobles in his court with slave administrators, which increased his ability to rule without interference by others.

Elsewhere in Niger, slavery was practiced in a variety of different ways. In the Zarma speaking regions in the west of Niger, slavery provided the crucial workforce in agriculture. It has been estimated that up to 75% of the population in these regions were slaves in 1904–1905. Unlike Damagaram and Bornu regions, any slave could be freed by their master in Zarma practices.

In Northern Niger, in the present regions of Tahoua and Agadez, there are no signs of large-scale indigenous practices of slavery before the Tuareg entered the area in the 1800s. Since the light-skinned Tuaregs were the only slave holders and the dark-skinned indigenous population was largely held in servitude, the division of society between free and slaves adopted a racial division in these regions. The most important Tuareg community were the Kel Owey who settled in the Aïr Mountain region. Because of the rugged terrain with severe drought effects, and because of their participation in the trans-Saharan trade, the Tuareg used a form of slavery where communities of slaves would tend animals and do limited agriculture and would be allowed to move freely around an area. Although these communities had some significant liberties, their harvest, products, and children were closely controlled by a Tuareg noble.

In the Hausa societies in central Niger, slavery was primarily practiced in royal courts and thus of a limited nature. Similarly, in what is today the Maradi Region in central Niger, the Maradi leaders were engaged in a long-running series of tensions with the Sokoto Caliphate involving slave raiding by both sides. However, the Maradi mostly took slaves for ransom and domestic slavery was usually only used by the aristocracy and people of power.

=== French rule and independence ===
When the French took over the region in the early 1900s they had a policy banning the existence of slavery. The French officially banned slavery in all French West Africa in 1905, but did not enforce the ban since they did not view enforcement to be politically possible, and the French policy was therefore to officially prohibit slavery and informally tolerate its continuation.

However local French administrators usually resisted pressure to abolish slavery from the colonial and metropolitan governments. French administrators would take credit for abolishing slavery by simply ignoring its continued existence or claiming that the bonds were voluntary. One local administrator justified such a policy by saying, "I do not think it is presently possible to eliminate slavery. Our civilization has not penetrated deeply enough for the natives, both masters and slaves, to understand and accept any measures towards the outright elimination of slavery." The local colonial administrators did however carry out policies to put a stop to slave trafficking and slave markets. During World War I, in order to meet quotas of troops to the French army, traditional chiefs supplied slaves to the colonial administration. In urban areas and settled communities with a strong French administrative presence, slavery and forced servitude were gradually ended, but in the rest of the country the practices remained active.

Traditional chiefs, who had been major slave owners particularly in Tuareg communities, became prominent leaders of the country after independence. They held positions in government and were the leaders of many of the major parties during the brief multi-party period of the country. These prominent positions of slave-holders continued during the military dictatorship where the regional chiefs were relied upon for support of that government. As a result, slavery was largely an ignored issue by the government for the early decades of independence.

== Modern slavery ==
Slavery continues to exist in Niger today. The most significant survey of slavery in Niger identified 11,000 respondents throughout the country as being slaves. Using further responses from these a partial sample revealed 43,000 slaves. Further extrapolating from this information, and including the children of slaves, the anti-slavery organization Timidria estimated a possible total of 870,363 slaves (both chattel slaves and passive slaves) in Niger in 2002–2003. The existence of slavery is not limited to a single ethnic group or region, although it is more prominent in some. A 2005 report by the Convention on the Elimination of All Forms of Discrimination Against Women found that "slavery is a living reality among virtually all ethnic groups, especially the Tuaregs, the Arabs and the nomadic Fulani" and the report also identifies the Hausa. A 2005 study stated that over 800,000 Niger people are enslaved, consisting of nearly 8% of the population.

Anti-Slavery International identifies three different types of slavery practiced in Niger today: chattel slavery, a "milder form" of slavery where former slaves are forced to give some of their crops to a former master, and wahaya, a form of concubinage involving the purchase of girls to do household chores and as sexual servants of their masters. Chattel slavery involves the direct ownership of an individual and there are limited examples of slave buying still occurring in Niger in the early 21st century. More prominent is the second type of slavery, sometimes called passive slavery, in which former slaves retain some tributary and forced-labor relationship with former masters. Individual freedoms are still controlled in this form and people can be beaten or otherwise punished for disobeying former masters.

Wahaya is a unique form of slavery currently in practice in Niger (and parts of Nigeria) which involves the sale of young girls (the majority before the age of 15) who are born into slavery in Tuareg communities and then sold to wealthy and prominent Hausa individuals as an unofficial "fifth wife." The women perform domestic duties for their master and the official wives, as well as forced sexual relationship with the master. They are considered fifth wives because they are in addition to the four wives a person can legally have in Niger (according to Islamic tradition) and are considered subservient to the official wives. Despite the name, men can take multiple "fifth wives."

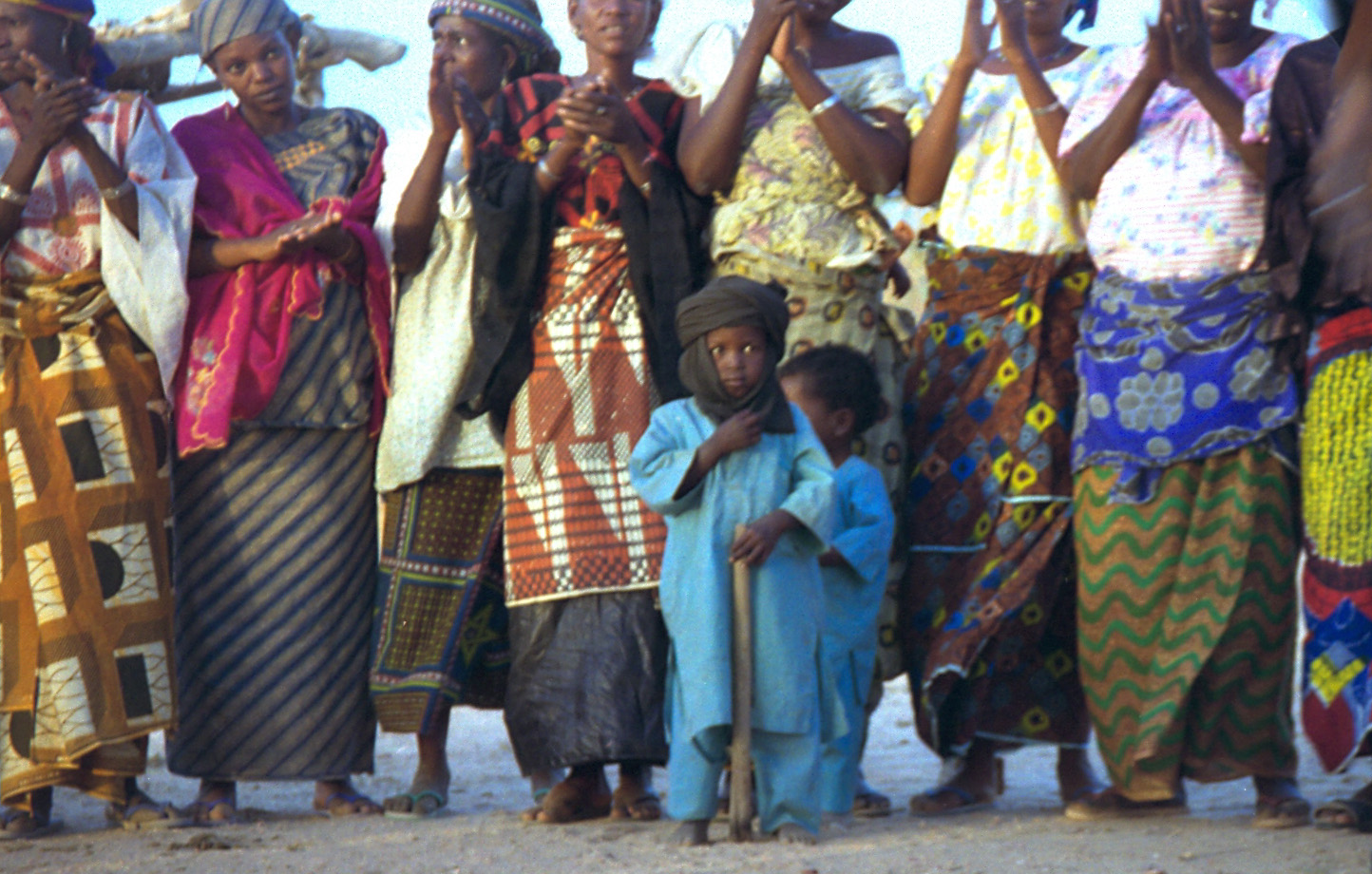
Tuareg women and children, Niger, 1997

Although slavery is rare in urban environments, social pressure and social prohibitions on marriages of the descendants of slaves with the descendants of free persons creates a caste system which separates people even where slavery no longer exists.

=== Human trafficking ===
Human trafficking has become an increasing problem in Niger in recent years. For many years, Niger was primarily a transit country for human trafficking, but was limited as a source or destination country. However, in the 2000s, when other routes saw increasing enforcement, routes through Niger became more prominent, and Niger also began to become a source country for human trafficking. Following this increasing problem, Niger passed a law against human trafficking in 2010 and created high level positions in the government in order to deal with the problem. The 2011 United States Department of State report found that although Niger is making some progress on the issue of human trafficking, the political and administrative situation following the 2010 coup prevented effective efforts.

=== Laws against slavery ===
Although the Constitution of Niger declares all people equal, there was no law specifically against slavery or any criminal offense for enslaving another human in Niger until 5 May 2003. The French directives of 1905 and 1920, which were part of the Nigerien legal corpus after independence, pertained solely to the slave trade and did not stop domestic servitude or hereditary slavery. In 2003, the new law was passed which did criminalize slavery with a maximum prison sentence of up to 30 years. The law though does include systems of mediation between slaves and masters as a necessary first step in the process. With this legislation, Niger was the first country in West Africa to pass a law specifically pertaining to slavery and creating a criminal penalty for the offense.

Two years later, there was a plan for a significant number of public ceremonies where Tuareg slaveholders would formally free their slaves. The government initially co-sponsored a prominent event in which Arissal Ag Amdagu, a Tuareg chief in Inates, Tillabéri Department would free 7,000 of his slaves. However, apparently fearing bad publicity, right before the event happened, the government sent a delegation through the Tuareg areas threatening punishment for any public manumissions. The government claimed that the public ceremony was changed because no one is enslaved in the country anymore so it was not necessary. Although Ag Amagdagu had signed a pledge with Timidria that he would free these 7,000 slaves, he instead said at the event that "Slavery doesn't exist in Inates ... Nobody has told me they have seen slaves. If someone has slaves they must tell me."

=== Mani v. Niger ===
Mani v. Niger, sometimes called a "historic" or a "landmark" decision, was a case in the Economic Community of West African States (ECOWAS) Community Court of Justice which served as the first regional court decision to be heard on the issue of slavery in Africa. According to Jeroen Beirnauer who is the head of ITUC's Forced Labor Project, the case set "a regional standard in international human rights law."

The basis for the case was that in 1996, 12-year-old Hadijatou Mani Koraou, who had been born into slavery in a Tuareg community, was sold for US$400 to 46-year-old El Hadj Souleymane Naroua as his "fifth wife" under the wahaya custom. Over nine years of violence and forced sexual relations, Mani gave birth to four children with Naroua. In 2005, Naroua signed a formal document freeing Mani, but then declared that she was his wife and prevented her from leaving his house. Mani received an initial judgement freeing her from the marriage on 20 March 2006 because, the court declared, there was never a religious ceremony marrying the two. This ruling was then reversed at a higher level and the case moved all the way to the Supreme Court. While the case was pending, Mani remarried and Naroua responded by filing a criminal complaint and getting her and her new husband convicted of bigamy (with a sentence of six months in prison). The court held that she was still legally married to Naroua and used her slave status as a justification for the marriage. In response to the charge of bigamy, Mani filed charges against Naroua for slavery in 2007 and followed this with a petition to the ECOWAS court on 14 December 2007 asking them to find Niger in violation of the African Charter on Human and Peoples' Rights.

Niger's main argument was that the case was inadmissible to the ECOWAS court because domestic options had not been exhausted for remedying the situation. In terms of the case, Niger argued that although slavery still existed, they had made gains against it and it was largely being limited. The ECOWAS court found on 27 October 2008 that neither argument was sufficient and ruled for Mani. ECOWAS rejected the domestic exhaustion standard for a case to be brought to it and used the Barcelona Traction International Court of Justice case as precedent to find that slavery required special attention by all organs of the state. Mani was awarded US$21,500 and expenses in the case.

After the ruling, the government of Niger said they accepted the ruling with a Nigerien government lawyer in the case announcing that "A ruling has been made, we have taken note of it and it will be applied."

=== Social movements against slavery ===
The main social movement dedicated to the issue of slavery and post-slave discrimination in Niger is Timidria, a non-governmental organization founded by Ilguilas Weila and other intellectuals on 15 May 1991. Its name means fraternity or solidarity in Tamajaq. The organization holds regular congresses and organizes a host of different events to raise prominence to the issue of slavery in Niger and fight for its eradication.

== See also ==
- Human trafficking in Niger
- Human rights in Niger
- Slavery in Africa
- Slavery in modern Africa
