= Human trafficking in Equatorial Guinea =

In 2009 Equatorial Guinea was principally a destination for children subjected to trafficking in persons, specifically conditions of forced labor and possibly commercial sexual exploitation. Children were believed to be recruited and transported from nearby countries, primarily Nigeria, Benin, Cameroon, and Gabon, and forced to work in domestic servitude, market labor, ambulant vending, and other forms of forced labor, such as carrying water and washing laundry. Most victims were believed to be exploited in Malabo and Bata, where a burgeoning oil industry created demand for labor and commercial sexual exploitation. Women may also have been recruited and transported to Equatorial Guinea from Cameroon, Benin, other neighboring countries, and from China for forced labor or forced prostitution. In October 2009, the vessel Sharon was detained in Gabon with 285 immigrants aboard, including 34 children identified as trafficking victims destined for Equatorial Guinea. Reports that women of Equatoguinean extraction were trafficked to Iceland for commercial sexual exploitation during the last reporting period have not reappeared.

In 2009 the Government of Equatorial Guinea did not fully comply with the minimum standards for the elimination of trafficking; however, it is making significant efforts to do so. Despite these efforts, such as anti-trafficking training for law enforcement personnel, the government did not prosecute any trafficking offenses during the reporting period. It routinely deported trafficking victims without recognizing their victim status or referring them to assistance services. It continued to provide anti-trafficking training to law enforcement officials, and police monitoring of possible child labor exploitation in open-air markets, though for another consecutive year, this training failed to lead to tangible anti-trafficking actions.

The U.S. State Department's Office to Monitor and Combat Trafficking in Persons placed the country in "Tier 3" in 2017 and 2023.

Equatorial Guinea ratified the 2000 UN TIP Protocol in February 2003.

In 2021, the country had a potential prison sentence of up to ten years for human trafficking.

The Organised Crime Index noted in 2023 that the Obiang government had never prosecuted anyone for human trafficking.

== Prosecution (2009) ==
The Government of Equatorial Guinea demonstrated minimal law enforcement efforts to combat trafficking during the reporting period; the few measures taken were incidental to efforts to tighten border security and to control more closely immigration, emigration, and the issuance of work and travel permits to foreign migrants. Equatorial Guinea prohibits all forms of trafficking through its 2004 Law on the Smuggling of Migrants and Trafficking in Persons, which prescribes 10 to 15 years imprisonment, and sufficiently stringent punishments. To date, no human trafficking cases were prosecuted under the relevant portion of this law. The government demonstrated no evidence of its forging partnerships with other governments in the region to investigate and prosecute trafficking cases. There was no evidence, however, of government officials’ involvement in or tolerance of trafficking. Under a government-funded contract with a foreign security training company, instructors conducted courses to improve the awareness of military and police officials on human trafficking issues. Two government officials - one from the Ministry of Defense and a sitting Supreme Court justice - assisted in the training. In December 2009, the government signed a new five-year contract with the foreign company that will address maritime security and include instruction on human rights and human trafficking issues.

== Protection (2009) ==
The Government of Equatorial Guinea demonstrated no effective measures to protect trafficking victims during the reporting period. The government has no law to provide benefits or services to victims and witnesses; it did not provide funding or support to any victim care facilities, though such services are called for in the government’s National Plan Against Human Trafficking. Law enforcement authorities did not employ procedures to identify victims of trafficking among foreign women and children in prostitution or foreign children in exploitative labor conditions. The government also did not make efforts - in either a systematic or ad hoc way - to refer victims to organizations that provide short- or long-term care. The provision of care for child trafficking victims was the responsibility of the Ministry of Social Affairs and the Catholic Church. In practice, only Equatoguinean children were placed in a church or NGO-run an orphanage for care; foreign children were usually deported summarily. The government did not provide foreign trafficking victims with access to legal, medical, or psychological services, and the government made little effort to assist them with temporary or permanent resident status, or any other relief from deportation. The government did not keep records on the total number of trafficking victims identified during this reporting period. The government continued to provide specialized training for law enforcement and immigration officials on identifying and assisting victims of trafficking during the reporting period, and these trained officials were issued wallet-sized instruction cards showing the steps to take when a trafficking situation or victim is identified. Social workers received no such training. The government deported foreign trafficking victims without care or assistance after a brief detention and seldom notified the victims’ embassies. Officials did not appear to be fifindictims but frequently confiscated their possessions and money. No victims were penalized for unlawful acts committed due to being trafficked during the reporting period. The government gave little to no assistance - such as medical aid, shelter, or financial help - to its nationals who were repatriated as victims of trafficking.

== Prevention (2009) ==
The government of Equatorial Guinea undertook limited trafficking prevention efforts during the year. In partnership with UNICEF and a foreign contractor, the government provided anti-trafficking information and educational campaigns during the reporting period - principally nationally broadcast radio and television spots to familiarize the general population with human trafficking. The Prime Minister’s Office directed activities of the Interagency Commission for Trafficking in Persons, which is chaired by the Ministry of Justice. The Commission also includes the Attorney General, and the Ministries of Health, Interior, National Security, and Women’s Affairs. It is not clear how often the committee met during the year. The government did not undertake any discernible measures to reduce the demand for forced labor or commercial sex acts during the year.
