= Hélène Kaziende =

Nigerien educator, journalist and writer (born 1967)

Hélène Kaziendé
- Born: 15 August 1967 (age 58); Niamey, Niger
- Citizenship: Nigerien
- Occupations: Educator, journalist and writer
- Notable work: Aydia (novel); Les fers de l'absence (novel)
- Awards: Prize for "Le Déserteur" (1992)

Hélène Kaziendé (born 15 August 1967) is a Nigerien educator, journalist and writer.

== Early life and education ==
Hélène Kaziendé was born in Niamey.

== Career ==
Her short story "Le Déserteur" ("The Deserter") won a prize at a competition organized by radio station Africa No. 1. It was included in the collection Kilomètre 30. Afrique: 30 ans d'indépendance, published in 1992.

=== Selected works ===
- Aydia, novel (2006)
- Les fers de l'absence, novel (2011)

== Personal life ==
Since 1996, Kaziendé has been living in Togo.

== See also ==
- List of Nigeriens
- List of novelists
- List of short story authors
- List of women writers
