= Human trafficking in Cameroon =

In 2009 Cameroon was a country of origin, transit, and destination for children subjected to trafficking in persons, specifically forced labor, and a country of origin for women in forced labor. Individual trafficking operations usually involved the trafficking of two or three children at most, as when rural parents handed over their children to a seemingly benevolent middleman who may promise education and a better life in the city. A 2007 study conducted by the Cameroon government reported that 2.4 million children from Cameroon’s ten regions involuntarily work in forced domestic servitude, street vending, and child prostitution, or in hazardous settings, including mines and tea or cocoa plantations, where they are treated as adult labourers. An unknown number of these children are trafficking victims.

Nigerian and Beninese children attempting to transit Cameroon en route to Gabon, Equatorial Guinea, or adjacent countries also fall into the hands of traffickers who force them to stay in the country and work. An unknown number of Cameroonian women are lured abroad by fraudulent proposals of marriage on the Internet or offers of work in domestic service and subsequently become victims of forced labor or forced prostitution - principally in Switzerland and France, and according to reports in 2009, as far away as Russia. This trafficking reportedly is facilitated by corrupt officials who accepted bribes for the issuance of travel documents.

The State Department's Office to Monitor and Combat Trafficking in Persons placed the country in "Tier 2 Watchlist" in 2017. The country was moved to Tier 2 in 2023.

Cameron ratified the 2000 UN TIP Protocol in February 2006.

In 2023, the Organised Crime Index gave Cameroon a score of 6.5 out of 10 for human trafficking.

== Prosecution (2009) ==
The Government of Cameroon does not fully comply with the minimum standards for the elimination of trafficking. However, it is making significant efforts to do so. Despite these efforts, the government did not show evidence of increasing efforts to convict and punish trafficking offenders, including complicit officials, and to identify and protect victims of trafficking. While state prosecutors coordinated efforts with Interpol to investigate suspected trafficking offenses, particularly in the Northwest Region, there have been no reports of new trafficking prosecutions or convictions.

Experts consider the 2005 law against child trafficking to be well written but underused because there is no system to provide relevant judicial officials with copies of new laws. Judges, law enforcement officials, and social workers do not enforce the legislation because they are not familiar with it. The government did not take measures to complete and enact a 2006 draft law prohibiting trafficking of adults. It failed to investigate reports of maintaining hereditary servants in involuntary servitude in the Northern Region. In August 2009, the Ministry of Social Affairs, in partnership with UNICEF and NGO's, began to develop a guide for protecting vulnerable children from exploitation, including trafficking, but did not complete a draft by the expected deadline at the end of 2009.

The Government of Cameroon demonstrated weak anti-trafficking law enforcement efforts over the last year. The government enacted no relevant legislation during 2009, and the country does not have a law prohibiting all forms of trafficking in persons, as its 2006 draft law against adult trafficking has yet to be passed and enacted. The country’s existing 2005 law against child trafficking and slavery prescribes a penalty of 20 years’ imprisonment for these offenses - a punishment that is sufficiently stringent and commensurate with penalties prescribed for other serious offenses.

During 2009, authorities investigated 26 new cases of human trafficking, as well as 18 other cases of possible trafficking offenses, none of which has resulted in a prosecution. All of the 26 cases involved children, and 10 of the cases were arrests and detentions pending trials. Several factors delay these cases, including the limited number of gendarmes and police officers available in rural areas, poor understanding of trafficking issues among victims who may be illiterate, and the lack of any security units specifically assigned to anti-trafficking details. The remaining 16 cases were alleged trafficking offenders who were caught in the act and arrested, but finally released after the matter was resolved either at the level of security forces, social affairs agencies, or a human rights lawyer’s chambers.

To address these cases, officials used the 2005 anti-child trafficking law and the pertinent provisions of the penal code. The government reported no trafficking convictions during 2009. The government did not investigate traditional leaders in the Northern Region suspected of keeping hereditary servants in conditions of involuntary servitude. Official sources give no indication that the government facilitates or condones trafficking, though there were signs of some officials’ involvement in trafficking.

In November 2009, a Bamenda-based lawyer filed a complaint against a commissioner of one of the police districts for complicity in child trafficking. The lawyer claimed that the commissioner opposed the arrest and detention of a woman caught while committing transnational trafficking. The Bamenda High Court took no action on the complaint against the police commissioner during 2009.

== Protection (2009) ==
The Cameroonian government showed sustained but weak efforts, which were limited due to financial constraints, to ensure that victims of trafficking received access to necessary assistance during the year. The government acknowledged that trafficking is a problem in Cameroon, and provided some direct assistance to victims, including temporary residency status, shelter, and medical care. Government personnel did not demonstrate systematic and proactive efforts to identify trafficking victims among vulnerable groups, such as street children, women in prostitution, and illegal migrants, or refer these victims to necessary care, though government officials did informally refer victims to service providers. The government did not discriminate on the basis of country of origin of trafficking victims; however, it did not provide legal alternatives to the removal of foreign victims to countries where they may face hardship or retribution.

The informal system employed by government personnel for referring victims in need of short- and long-term shelter to government-run or NGO facilities is cumbersome. Once security officials identified individuals as trafficking victims, they addressed a report to the local administrative authority, which in turn directed victims to the appropriate government agency for appropriate action, including the provision of lodging in shelters or homes, medical care, and food. By the end of 2009, the government had begun to renovate the few care centers it maintains for trafficking victims. In August 2009, the Ministry of Social Affairs began working with UNICEF to draft a manual that would show families respected in local communities how to create foster homes that provide shelter, food, health care, and education to trafficking victims - a new model for protection in the country, scheduled to begin in 2010.

The government encouraged victims to assist in the investigation and prosecution of trafficking cases. Victims were provided the opportunity to file civil suits against trafficking offenders, though in the case of child victims, adult family members needed to instigate proceedings. At least one such case was pending in the Northwest Region at the end of 2009, with an 18-year-old victim, supported by local organizations, suing an alleged trafficking offender. Through the National Commission on Human Rights and Freedoms, and national and international NGOs, the government for the first time provided specialized training on how to identify trafficking victims to some of its officials, including law enforcement officers, in four regions of the country beginning in July 2009.

== Prevention (2009) ==
The Cameroonian government sustained weak trafficking prevention efforts over the last year. Radio and television broadcast the government’s anti-trafficking message daily, sometimes wrapped in sports-star endorsements or public service announcements. The government reported that customs agents, border police, and gendarmerie units increased monitoring of the country’s borders, notably at seaports and airports, but land borders continued to be rarely patrolled. Individuals passed freely between Cameroon and neighbor states.

The government reported no measures to reduce the demand for commercial sex acts within Cameroon. The government did not provide members of the Cameroonian armed forces with training on human trafficking prior to their deployment abroad on international peacekeeping missions.

== See also ==
- Human rights in Cameroon
