= Lirwana Abdourahmane =

Nigerien human rights lawyer and activist

- Occupations: Civil society activist, lawyer
- Organization: Mouvement patriotique pour une citoyenneté responsable
- Known for: Member of the Mouvement patriotique pour une citoyenneté responsable
- Notable work: Civic protests, political mobilization, advocacy for citizens’ rights

Lirwana Abdourahmane (also known as Abdourahmane Lirwana) is a lawyer and civil society advocate from Niger involved in civic activism who represents individuals and groups engaged in protests and public demonstrations. He has been associated with the Mouvement Patriotique pour une Citoyenneté Responsable (MPCR), a Nigerien organization that promotes civic engagement.

== Career and civic involvement ==
Abdourahmane has worked as a lawyer in Niger, where he has defended members of civil society groups facing legal charges related to public demonstrations and political activism. He has also been involved in organizing public events and discussions focused on government policies and citizen participation.

In 2018, Abdourahmane took part in protests against a new finance law introduced by the Nigerien government. Along with other civil society leaders, he opposed the law, arguing that it would have a negative impact on the population. The protests were part of a broader campaign led by civic groups calling for changes in economic and governance policies.

== Arrest and legal proceedings ==
=== 2018 arrest ===
On 25 March 2018, Abdourahmane was arrested in Niamey along with other activists after participating in a demonstration and charged with "provocation of an unarmed gathering". On 24 July 2018, a court in Niamey gave him a three-month suspended prison sentence. He also faced additional legal proceedings during this period. His arrest and detention were criticized by national and international organizations, which raised concerns about the treatment of civil society actors in Niger. On 13 July 2019 he was released from prison after several months in detention, and resumed his legal and civic activities.

=== 2026 arrest ===
On 21 September 2026, Abdourahmane was summoned by the police in Niamey and subsequently charged with "spreading data likely to disturb public order", and was detained. Human Rights Watch reported that the evidence used against Abdourahmane was a Facebook post he made on 12 September in which he alleged that the Niger Armed Forces was divided between supporters of Mahamadou Issoufou and Mohamed Bazoum, both former presidents. At a court hearing held on 6 October, prosecutors asked for Abdourahmane to be sentenced to five years' imprisonment.

== See also ==
- Human rights in Niger
- Moussa Tchangari
