= Arzika =

Arzika is a surname. Notable people with the surname include:

- Mohammed Arzika, Nigerian politician
- Nouhou Arzika, Nigerien activist and public figure
