= Hadizatou Mani =

Nigerien activist

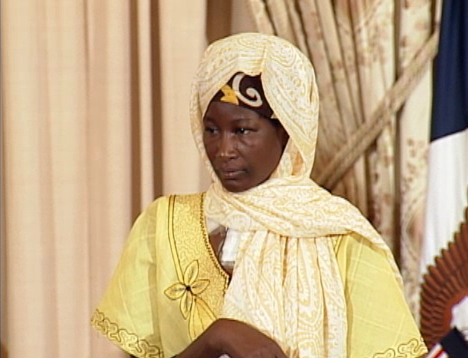
Hadizatou Mani when she visited Secretary of State Hillary Rodham Clinton and First Lady Michelle Obama in 2009.

Hadizatou Mani (born 1984) is a Nigerien human rights activist who fought a legal battle to free herself from slavery, and who since her emancipation has acted as an anti-slavery advocate.

== Biography ==
Mani was born in Dogaroua in the Tahoua Region of central Niger in 1984. When she was 12, she was sold into slavery for $500. She became her owner's fifth "wife", and had to carry out domestic tasks as well as physical labour. Mani was sexually abused throughout her enslavement and had four children, two of whom survived infancy.

In 2003, following international pressure, slavery became illegal in Niger. Timidria, a Nigerien non-governmental organisation, forced Mani's master to sign a certificate of emancipation for Mani and another of his wives, although Mani was not initially informed that she had been emancipated.

Multiple legal battles ensued following Mani's emancipation; the first upheld her freedom, while a second stated that this was not the case. Mani remarried following her initial emancipation, and her former husband accused her of bigamy as a result. A final court case in 2008, in which Mani was supported by Anti-Slavery International and Timidria and presented her case before the court of the Economic Community of West African States, was ultimately successful; ECOWAS subsequently called on its member states to protect their citizens against slavery.

Following the final court case, Mani was awarded $20, 000 in damages, and received international attention for her plight, including being awarded an International Women of Courage Award in 2009 from then-First Lady Michelle Obama and then-Secretary of State, Hillary Clinton. Time named Mani as one of their most influential people of 2009.

Despite Mani's legal victory, slavery continues to occur in Niger, and Mani has since become an anti-slavery campaigner and has helped other female victims of slavery through Timidria to challenge their enslavements in legal courts. This included a 2014 court case in which a man was sentenced to four years imprisonment for enslaving a woman.

In 2022, Mani was named by the BBC as one of its 100 Women of the year.
