= Fetish priest =

Type of religious person in West Africa

In Ghana, Togo, Benin and other countries of West Africa, a fetish priest is a person who serves as a mediator between the spirits and the living. Fetish priests usually live and worship their gods in enclosed places, called a "fetish shrine". The fetish shrine is a simple mud hut with some kind of enclosure or fence around it. The priest or priestess performs rituals to consult and seek the favor from his gods in the shrine. The rituals are performed with money, liquor, animals, and in some places, human sex slaves called trokosi, fiashidi, or woryokwe. The priest is usually chosen through "spiritual nomination of the shrine" through divination.
