= Emaniel Djibril Dankawa =

Nigerien football player

Emanuel Djibril Dankawa
Personal information
- Place of birth: Niger
- Position: Centre back

Team information
- Current team: Olympic F.C.

Senior career*
| Years | Team | Apps | (Gls) |
| 2007– | Olympic F.C. | | |

International career
| 2008– | Niger | 4 | (0) |
- * Club domestic league appearances and goals

Emanuel Djibril Dankawa is a Nigerien football player. He plays for the Niger national football team. He can play all defensive and midfield positions.

Dankawa played for the Niger side that finished runners-up in the 2009 UEMOA Tournament., making his FIFA competitive debut for Niger on 31 May 2008 against Uganda in Kampala.
