= Nouhou Arzika =

Nigerien activist and public figure

Nouhou Mahamadou Arzika
- Born: 1968 (age 57–58); Dogondoutchi, Niger
- Education: University of Niamey
- Occupations: Civil society activist, political activist
- Years active: 1990s–present
- Organization: Mouvement patriotique pour une citoyenneté responsable
- Known for: Founder of the Mouvement patriotique pour une citoyenneté responsable
- Notable work: Civic protests, political mobilization, advocacy for citizens’ rights

Nouhou Mahamadou Arzika (born 1968) is a Nigerien civil society activist and public figure. He is the founder and president of the Mouvement patriotique pour une citoyenneté responsable (Patriotic Movement for Responsible Citizenship), a civic movement active in Niger's political and social discourse. Arzika is known for his advocacy on behalf of citizens' rights, his criticism of government policies, and his leadership in public mobilization efforts.

== Early life and education ==
Nouhou Arzika was born in 1968 in Niger. He began his primary education in the town of Dogondutsi and attended secondary school in the city of Dosso. He later studied at the University of Niamey, where he became actively involved in civic and student movements, laying the foundation for his future activism.

== Career ==
=== Activism and Civic Engagement ===
Nouhou Arzika gained public recognition in Niger for his outspoken views on social and economic justice. His movement promotes responsible citizenship, civic participation, and government accountability. He has organized several peaceful protests and press campaigns addressing issues such as rising living costs, taxation, and foreign military presence in the country.

In 2015, Arzika was arrested along with other civil society leaders, including Moussa Tchangari, for their opposition to government policies. The arrest was widely condemned by human rights organizations and seen as an attempt to suppress free expression.

=== Political Aspirations ===
In 2017, Arzika publicly expressed interest in contesting for the presidency of Niger. He argued for a shift in political leadership and pledged to bring citizen-focused reforms through democratic means.

=== Arrests and Legal Challenges ===
Throughout his career, Arzika has faced legal harassment, surveillance, and periods of detention due to his activism. International watchdogs and rights groups have criticized the Government of Niger's handling of civil society leaders, citing violations of human rights and freedom of assembly.
