= Human trafficking in Mali =

Mali ratified the 2000 UN TIP (trafficking in persons) Protocol in April 2002.

In 2010 Mali was a source, transit, and destination country for men, women, and children subjected to trafficking in persons, specifically forced labor and, to a lesser extent, forced prostitution. Within Mali, women and girls were forced into domestic servitude and, to a limited extent, prostitution. Malian boys were found in conditions of forced begging and forced labor in gold mines and agricultural settings both within Mali and neighboring countries. Reports indicated that Malian children are trafficked to Senegal and Guinea for forced labor in gold mines and for forced labor on cotton and cocoa farms in Côte d'Ivoire. Boys from Mali, Guinea, Burkina Faso, Niger and other countries were forced into begging and exploited for labor by religious instructors within Mali and across borders. Adult men and boys, primarily of Songhai ethnicity, were subjected to the longstanding practice of debt bondage in the salt mines of Taoudenni in northern Mali. Some members of Mali's black Tamachek community were subjected to traditional slavery-related practices rooted in hereditary master-slave relationships.

In 2010 the Government of Mali did not fully comply with the minimum standards for the elimination of trafficking; however, it made significant efforts to do so. Despite these efforts, such as assisting with the identification and rescue of 80 child trafficking victims and drafting new anti-trafficking legislation, the government failed to show evidence of progress in prosecuting and convicting trafficking offenders, and did not take action on five pending cases of traditional slavery. Therefore, in 2010, Mali was placed on the Tier 2 Watch List for the second consecutive year. The country was moved to Tier 2 again in 2023.

== Prosecution (2010) ==
The Government of Mali demonstrated limited law enforcement efforts to combat trafficking during the last year. Mali does not prohibit all forms of trafficking, though Article 244 of the criminal code prohibits all forms of child trafficking. Conviction of child trafficking carries a penalty of from five to 20 years' imprisonment. These penalties are sufficiently stringent and comparable with penalties for sexual assault. Article 229 of the criminal code criminalizes the sexual exploitation of children and forced prostitution of adult women. Malian law may not adequately criminalize other forms of trafficking. Criminal Code Article 242, passed in 1973, prohibits individuals from entering into agreements or contracts that deprive third parties of their liberty: NGOs argue that this law, which has sometimes been characterized as an anti-slavery law, is inadequate to prosecute cases of hereditary slavery. In November 2009, the Malian government participated in a conference organized by a leading anti-slavery NGO to introduce draft anti-slavery legislation to civil society organizations, and officials plan to introduce a separate law outlawing all forms of trafficking to the Malian legislature later in 2010.

During the reporting period, the government made two arrests for human trafficking offenses: in both cases, the suspected traffickers were released without trial. Malian authorities reported no prosecutions or convictions of trafficking offenders. On two occasions in 2009, one suspected trafficking offender was taken into custody by Malian authorities with trafficked children in his possession as he attempted to leave the country: on both occasions, he was released with no explanation. A trial date has not yet been set for three individuals arrested in March 2008 for allegedly trafficking two Malian and 24 Guinean children to Mali from Guinea; they were released in June pending trial. Six cases of traditional enslavement remained pending in Malian courts and judicial authorities have taken no discernible action to prosecute these cases to completion in a criminal court. In one case, however, local authorities responded to an NGO request to discuss an amicable resolution, though this is not an adequate response to an alleged crime of slavery. One of these cases involves a black Tamachek child taken from his parents in Kidal in September 2007 by an individual claiming traditional ownership rights over the child; the child remains in the custody of this traditional master.

During the reporting period, the government provided no training on human trafficking investigations or legislation to Malian law enforcement and judicial officials. Authorities collaborated with the governments of Burkina Faso, Guinea, and Mauritania to secure the repatriation of trafficking victims. There were no reports of official complicity in human trafficking. Some officials may not perceive certain kinds of trafficking, such as forced begging at the order of Koranic teachers, as egregious human trafficking offenses, thereby impeding some trafficking investigations. Traditional conflict mediation was favored over the rule of law in some cases of child trafficking and exploitation. In several cases, for example, authorities released religious teachers suspected of forcing children to beg after it was determined that the teacher had the parents' permission to take the child.

== Protection (2010) ==
The Government of Mali demonstrated moderate efforts to protect trafficking victims in the last year. Authorities did not report a formal system for identifying trafficking victims among vulnerable populations, such as child laborers. Due to its limited resources, the government did not operate any victim shelters or provide direct aid to victims. Instead, it referred victims to NGOs and international organizations for assistance, and provided in-kind support to these organizations in the form of land or buildings. Authorities reported assisting 80 child victims of trafficking during 2009. The government did not report assisting any victims of traditional slavery. Most cases of trafficking identified by NGOs are reported to the government, and an official from the Ministry for the Advancement of Women, Children, and the Family coordinates the process of repatriation with a counterpart in the government of the victim's country of origin.

During the reporting period, officials interviewed victims in one suspected child trafficking case and also interviewed one victim of traditional slavery. Mali does not provide legal alternatives to the removal of foreign victims to countries where they face hardship or retribution. Identified victims are not inappropriately incarcerated or fined for unlawful acts committed as a direct result of being trafficked. While the Malian government stated that it has developed a system for collecting data on trafficking crimes and the number of victims identified, officials have not made this system public.

== Prevention ==
The Government of Mali made limited efforts to prevent trafficking, through awareness-raising or other means, in 2023. It held two events on World Day Against Trafficking in Persons in collaboration with international organizations, and organized a national forum on the fight against hereditary slavery. A regional government office in the zone with the higher prevalence of forced agricultural labor operated a public awareness campaign on child trafficking and child labor. However, many government officials do not acknowledge that hereditary slavery exists in Mali. During the reporting period, the National Steering Committee Against Child Labor, which is composed of 43 government, NGO, and international organization members, reported no actions and suffered from poor interagency communication. However, the Ministry for the Promotion of Women and Children created a more streamlined committee to combat trafficking, and the Malian government decided to introduce a law criminalizing all forms of trafficking in 2010. The government took no visible measures to reduce the demand for commercial sex acts or forced labor.

== See also ==
- Human rights in Mali
- Slavery in Mali
