= Tchima Illa Issoufou =

Nigerien journalist

- Occupation: Journalist
- Employer: BBC Hausa
- Notable work: Reporting on security and governance issues in Niger

Tchima Illa Issoufou is a Nigerien journalist and correspondent for BBC Hausa, known for her reporting on security, governance, and civil society in Niger. In 2024, she fled the country after facing threats and government intimidation related to her journalistic work, particularly after covering unrest in the Tillabéri region and interviewing civil society activist Ali Tera. Her case drew international attention to deteriorating press freedoms in Niger under military rule.

== Career ==
Illa Issoufou worked as a reporter and correspondent for BBC Hausa, covering political developments, regional security threats, and civil unrest in Niger and the broader Sahel region. Her reporting included in-depth coverage of government responses to jihadist violence, the conditions in conflict-affected regions such as Tillabéri, and the broader impact of instability on civilian populations.

== Threats and exile ==
In early 2024, Illa Issoufou faced threats after publishing reports on security challenges in Tillabéri, including a piece featuring commentary from activist Ali Tera. Shortly after the interview aired, Tera was arrested by Nigerien authorities, and Illa Issoufou was reportedly questioned and intimidated by security personnel. Press freedom groups warned that she was being targeted for her reporting. Fearing for her safety, she left Niger in April 2024 and has since been living in self-imposed exile. Human rights organizations highlighted her case as emblematic of the repression facing journalists in Niger under the junta that came to power in a July 2023 coup.
