= Slavery in Mali =

Slavery in Mali exists today, with as many as 200,000 people held in direct servitude to a master. Since 2006, a movement called Temedt has been active in Mali struggling against the persistence of slavery and the discrimination associated with ex-slaves. There were reports that in the Tuareg Rebellion of 2012, ex-slaves were recaptured by their former masters. Moreover, the phenomenon of descent-based slavery still persist in different ethnic groups.

Slavery in Mali existed across different ethnic groups of Pre-Imperial Mali before the Muslim conquest. Slavery increased in importance with the Trans-Saharan slave trade across the Sahara during the Middle Ages, particularly during the Mali Empire, which traded West African slaves to the Berber and Arabic polities of North Africa. Following the collapse of the Mali Empire (c. 1600 AD), slave raiding increased and the slave trade became a key part of the economy in the Tuareg, Mandé, and Fula communities which would eventually be the major ethnic groups in the country of Mali.

When the area came under French colonial control in 1898, as French Sudan, the French authorities formally abolished slavery in 1905. Despite this declaration, traditional patterns of servitude persisted. Although some slaves left their positions of servitude following the declaration of 1905, many remained and in much of the country, slavery continued more or less unimpeded. With the political opening of the creation of the French Fourth Republic in 1946, large numbers of slaves left their positions and slavery became a key political issue for the Sudanese Union – African Democratic Rally (US-RDA) party.

When the Republic of Mali achieved independence in 1960, the government tried to further undermine the institution of slavery but efforts were largely stalled when the military dictatorship of Moussa Traoré took over the country from 1968 until 1991.

== History and practices ==
=== Slavery before colonization ===
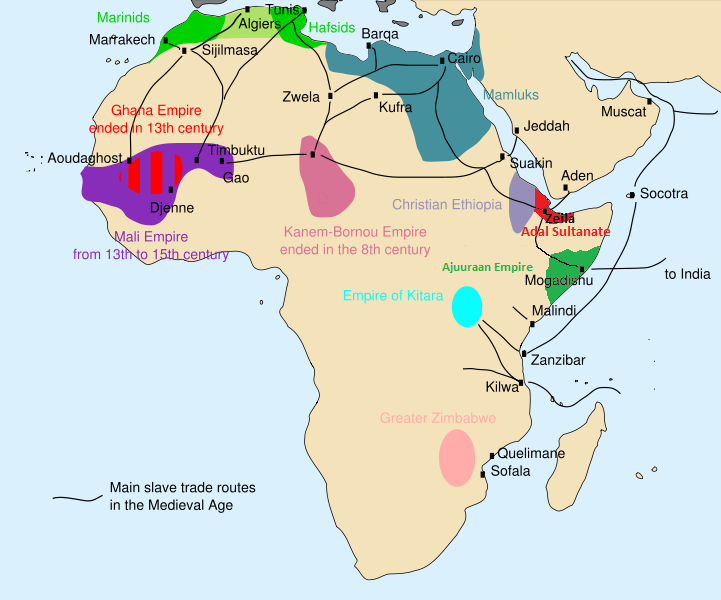
The trade routes of the slave trade in medieval Africa.

Inside the borders of present-day Mali, slavery existed for many centuries in the Mali Empire and the surrounding communities and kingdoms. Slavery continued to exist after the fall of the Mali Empire being a significant part of the economies of Tuareg, Mandé, and Fula communities. With the chaos at the fall of the Mali Empire, slave raiding and the slave trade increased significantly throughout the region.

The sale and trade of slaves in the 19th century was often regulated by Islamic legal codes allowing trade between different communities in the area. Slavery was not practiced in a uniform way and a variety of forms of servitude existed with distinctions often made between different types of slaves: for example between people bought or captured and those born into a household and also a distinction between those who tended herds and those who dealt with household tasks.

Slavery was not as essential in some communities with some in the southern part of present-day Mali having few or no slaves. However, in many parts of present-day Mali, slave labor was a key pillar of the economic system and relied on extensively. This reliance on slave labor was noted by early French administrators of the territory when the French were taking control of the area in the 1890s as a critical issue.

=== French control ===
The French took control over the region in the 1890s and established a limited administration as part of French West Africa. Eventually the area would be organized and called the French Sudan colony, but administration was often linked to other colonies in the region for much of the early 1900s. In 1903, French administrators were instructed to not use slave as an administrative category anymore: functionally, slave status could not be used anymore to decide legal or property issues.

==== French abolition of slavery (1905) ====
This was followed in 1905 when the French issued a formal decree ending slavery throughout French West Africa, including the area to become the country of Mali. Throughout French West Africa almost a million slaves responded to this by moving away from their masters and settling elsewhere, with the French supporting this effort by creating settlements around the Niger River and digging wells for communities elsewhere to engage in agriculture away from their former masters.

This process had an impact or effect on the Southern and Western parts of present-day Mali most significantly, but in the Northern and Eastern parts of the colony large numbers of slaves remained in relationships of servitude to their masters. Throughout the area of present-day Mali, rough estimates say that about one-third moved away and ended the slavery relationship while two-thirds remained with their masters. In the 1920s, most Tuareg households still had slaves who tended to the house and animals.

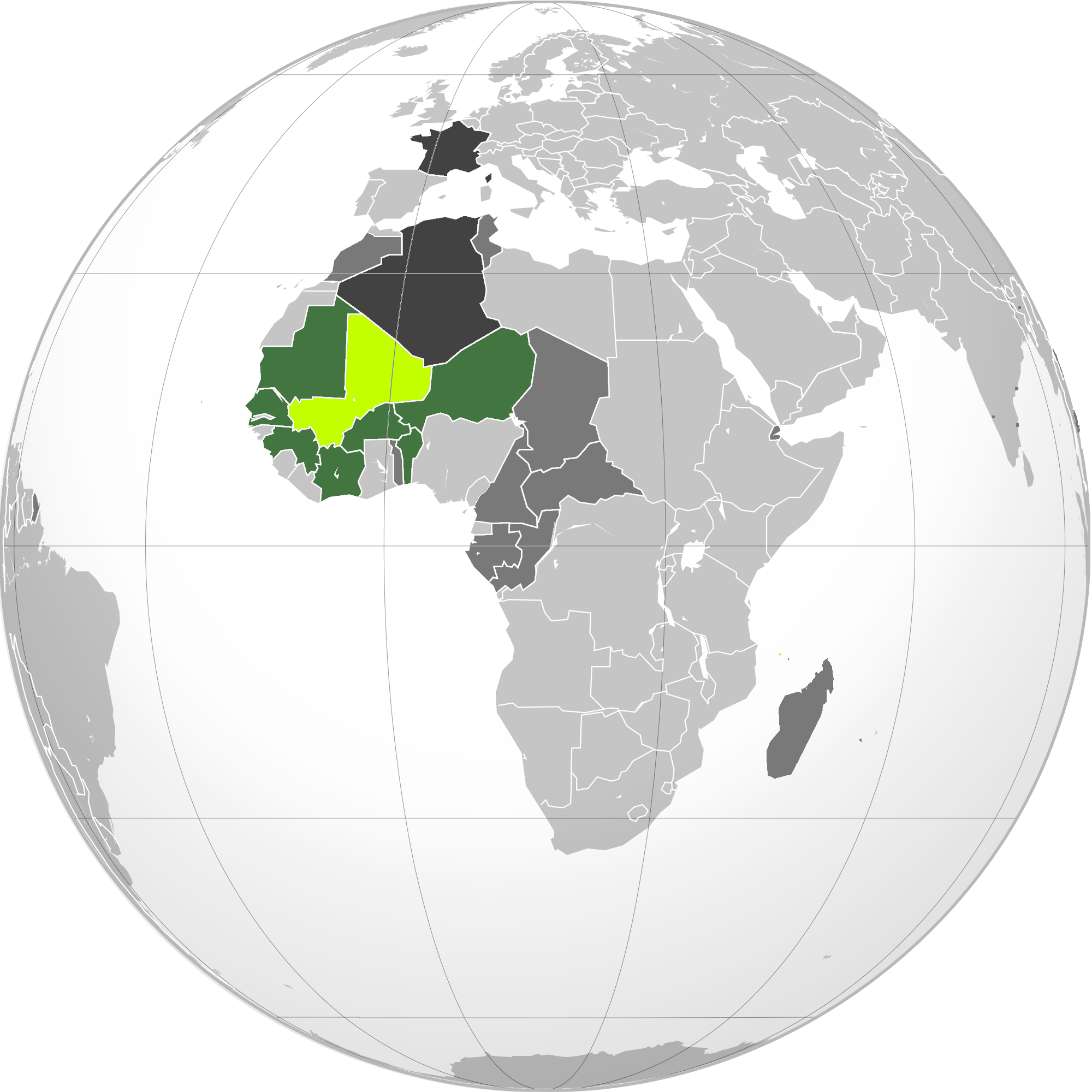
French Sudan (Lime) and the rest of the French colonies in Africa (Dark Green).

Although slavery persisted, some aspects of the relationship changed with the French administration. Slaves who escaped their masters could find official protection by French authorities in the cities for limited amounts of time. Slaves were sometimes able to renegotiate the terms of their servitude in the changed political situation. Some were willing to agree to maintain servitude status if they received control over their family life and were given some land to pass to their children. In addition, the French administration actively worked to end slave raiding and the most clear manifestations of the slave trade greatly reducing those means of acquiring slaves.

The efforts of the French administration on slave issues was largely connected to policies regarding the Tuareg areas. The Tuareg people had actively resisted French rule in the area until 1903 and were the cause of frequent revolts for many of the early decades of the 1900s (namely the Kaocen Revolt of 1916–1917). French administration largely sought to replace the political power of Tuareg society by undermining what they saw as a rigid hierarchy and caste system.

The French saw Tuareg society divided into groups of nobles, vassals, and slaves and decided to largely support the vassals in order to undermine the power of the nobles. In this effort, slaves were not considered a crucial aspect. The caste system was similarly imputed to have a racial dimension with vassals and nobles being defined as white and slaves defined as black.

As a result of the continued persistence of large numbers of slaves in Tuareg societies and the focus on vassals rather than slave populations, French administrators in the French Sudan reported incorrectly that slavery did not exist in Tuareg society so that the 1905 declaration ending slavery was largely being adhered to. Thus, for many decades after the 1905 abolition of slavery, the practice continued to exist in much of French Sudan.

The situation changed with a large number of slaves resiting their status starting in 1946. In that year, the French Fourth Republic was founded and a key part of the new constitution was direct elections for positions in the colonies. Along with these efforts, a political party came to prominence in the French Sudan, called the Sudanese Union – African Democratic Rally (US-RDA), which had a strong political base in the south of the colony. As a result of both its socialist ideology and to gain a political base in the north, the US-RDA encouraged slaves to resist their masters and become free. As a result, large numbers of slaves in the country began claiming ownership over their herds and land or simply moving to other areas where employment opportunities were available (maiu or to other colonies like the Gold Coast).

Large scale emancipation and many slave revolts occurred throughout the colony., sometimes creating new villages. One prominent example of slave revolt in 1955 in the town of Norben in the Gourma-Rharous Cercle. With encouragement from the US-RDA, slaves in the area took the entire herds they cared for and moved away from their master's land. The master then organized a violent raiding party on the slaves to attempt and take back the animals. The case came to the French administrator in the area who ruled that the slaves would be given independent status from their master and that they would receive more than half of the herd.

Despite these efforts by the French administration, the institution of slavery persisted through much of the colony and it was still possible in 1958 to purchase a slave in Timbuktu.

=== Independent Mali to the present (1960–) ===
Since independence in 1960, slavery continues to persist in Mali. In recent years there has been a movement trying to fight the continued practice of slavery and discrimination against ex-slaves. Although slavery is illegal, slave relationships continue to persist throughout Mali in every ethnic group in the country, although mainly in Tuareg communities.

In addition, there are reports that the status of ex-slaves and restrictions on their behavior exists in the Malian diaspora living in other countries. Some in the government claim that since there is freedom to leave the situations are not properly defined as slavery. The anti-slavery Malian organization Temedt contributed to a report claiming that up to two million people continue to be held in passive and active slave relationships, with as many as 200,000 people forcibly held as slaves.

==== Persistence of slavery ====
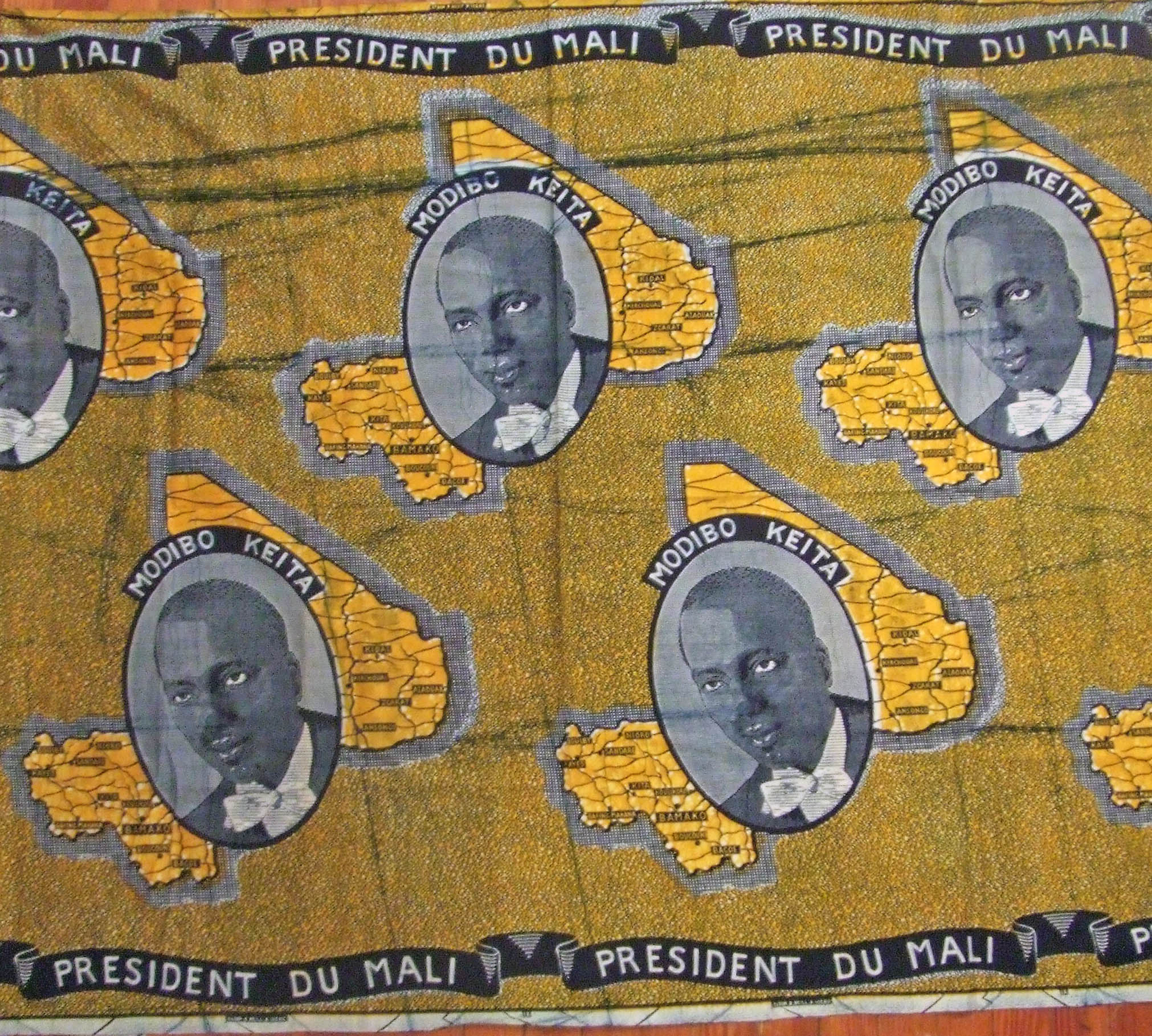
A poster of Modibo Keïta, the first President of Mali, who encouraged slaves to leave their masters.

In the early 1960s the first President of Mali, Modibo Keïta, and the US-RDA party made ending slavery a main issue for the party. Slavery was formally outlawed in the country and some efforts were made to continue the French efforts to resettle ex-slave populations. The US-RDA encouraged every slave in the country to leave their masters and many did. However, many returned within a year or two as a result of limited economic opportunities provided for ex-slaves in the country. Even these limited efforts were largely halted with the dictatorship of Moussa Traoré from 1968 until 1991.

Although legally allowed to leave, economic and social issues have kept many people in situations that are defined as slavery. In addition, even when freed, discrimination and political power is wielded over ex-slaves in many instances. Democratization in the 1990s did not necessarily entail emancipation and there are examples of former masters pressuring and forcing ex-slaves to vote for the candidates they prefer; however, there have also been examples of resistance to this pressure.

Some people who were formerly slaves or whose parents or grandparents were have risen to political prominence in post-dictatorship Mali (including Amadou Toumani Touré who was the President of Mali from 2002 until 2012). The discussion of their slave origins is largely suppressed and kept as a public secret to avoid the stigma attached with that history.

There are efforts by social movements to criminalize slavery and struggle against the stigma attached to ex-slaves. News reports about youth from Mali being involved in forcible work conditions in neighboring countries caused the government to introduce migration restrictions on all teenage Malians.

In 2002, New York Times writer Michael Finkel was fired from his job for creating a composite fictional character in reports of a child slave in Mali.

With the Tuareg Rebellion of 2012, the anti-slavery organization Temedt reported that the first people punished under the sharia system implemented were former slaves and some Tuareg families used the chaos to recapture slaves which had resisted in recent years.

==== Temedt ====
Temedt is a social movement which tries to end slavery throughout Mali and fight against negative stereotypes and discrimination against ex-slaves. It develops out of two efforts in the 1990s and today has over 30,000 members.

In the 1990s, Ibrahim Ag Idbaltanant (the current President of Temedt) founded the Groupement des Artisans Ruraux d’Intadeyni (GARI) which organized around providing education and micro-credit for people of slave descent in Tuareg areas. Similarly in 1994, Mohammed Ag Akeratane (the former President of Temedt) founded a movement known as Tazolt, a reference to the black paint that is sometimes added under the eyes of Tuareg people. These movements resulted in the creation of Temedt, meaning genealogy or solidarity, in 2006 in the city of Essakane.

The organization brings together intellectuals with a slave lineage to publicly challenge the practice and stigma of slavery. To protect themselves at their meetings, they invite government officials, other nongovernmental organizations, and Tuareg leaders to the events.

Temedt is involved in public awareness campaigns, assisting legal challenges to slavery, and political pressure on the government to improve attention to the issue. The public awareness campaigns include parades and folklore presentations as well as other efforts to end discrimination against ex-slaves. The organization also provides key lawyers to help with the prosecution of slave cases, and with assistance from the American Bar Association, have provided key legal efforts on a number of cases.

One prominent case occurred in October 2011 when the first person in Mali was prosecuted on allegations of slavery for exploiting Iddar Ag Ogazide. Temedt pressured for the case and provided financial assistance to Ag Ogazide's family during the difficult period. After a first hearing in which the accused claimed that he had paid Ag Ogazide for his work, the trial was delayed when the judge had to flee Gao for his safety. With the Tuareg Rebellion and the military coup, the case has been delayed further. The organization also pushes the government to further criminalize slavery and add additional sanctions against the practice and works with anti-slavery organizations in other countries and with Anti-Slavery International to coordinate efforts.

In 2012, the organization received the annual prize from Anti-Slavery International for their efforts against slavery.

== See also ==
- Human trafficking in Mali
- Slavery in Mauritania
