= Prostitution in Benin =

Prostitution in Benin is legal but related activities such as brothel keeping and benefiting from the prostitution of others are illegal. UNAIDS estimates there to be about 15,000 prostitutes in the country. Most of these are migrants from neighbouring countries, mainly Nigeria, Togo and Ghana. Only 15% of the prostitutes are Beninese. Prostitution occurs on the streets, in bars, restaurants, hotels and brothels. With advent of the smartphone, many prostitutes use apps to make arrangements with clients.

Many women enter prostitution for economic reasons. Some young Beninese women learn English so they can go to Nigeria to work as prostitutes as Nigeria has a thriving sex industry.

In rural areas widows will discreetly turn to prostitution to support her family. This is a cultural and social tradition that is not regarded as prostitution by the community, but is regarded as a method of preserving the family name. Any children born from these liaisons take the dead husband's name. It's not uncommon for a widow to have five children after her husband has died.

HIV, sex trafficking and child sex tourism are problems in the country.

== Sexual health ==
As with other sub-Saharan African countries, HIV is a problem. Sex workers are amongst the high risk groups. Clients are often soldiers and truck drivers. Because of their travelling, if they become infected, potentially they spread the infection over a wide area.

In 1992, a prevention project, supported by the Canadian International Development Agency (CIDA) was implemented among sex workers in the largest city, Cotonou. This saw condom use increase and HIV amongst sex workers fall from 53.3% in 1993 to 30.4% in 2008. The prevalence of other STIs also fell significantly in the same period: gonorrhoea 43.2 to 6.4% and chlamydia 9.4 to 2.8%.

The NGO, Centre d'Etudes, de Recherches et d'Interventions pour le Développement (CERID), provides sex workers with free medical treatment and counselling. UNAIDS reported in 2016 that the HIV prevalence amongst sex workers in the country was 15.7%.

== Sex trafficking ==
Benin is a source, transit, and destination country for women, children subjected to sex trafficking. Most identified victims are Beninese girls subjected to sex trafficking in Cotonou and across Benin's southern corridor. Togolese girls are exploited in commercial sex in Benin. Cases of child sex tourism involving both boys and girls along the coast and within the department of Mono have been reported in previous years. A 2016 survey conducted in the cities of Cotonou in southern Benin and Malanville in northern Benin indicated that girls are subjected to sexual exploitation, including potential sex trafficking, in these two cities. The department of Oueme in southeast Benin was reportedly a primary area of recruitment for child trafficking victims subsequently exploited in the Republic of the Congo. Most child victims intercepted in Benin, either from Benin or other West African countries, are exploited or en route to exploitation within the country. Benin is the largest source country for trafficking victims in the Republic of the Congo; Beninese victims are also subjected to trafficking in Nigeria, Gabon, and Lebanon. West African women are exploited in commercial sex in Benin. Young Beninese women are recruited from Benin by unlicensed Beninese and Lebanese recruiters for domestic work in Lebanon and Kuwait; reportedly, some are forced into commercial sex. OCPM reports that traffickers no longer travel with child victims being moved internally or to nearby countries. Victims now travel alone and are met by traffickers or their accomplices once they reach their destination. This tactic makes investigations more difficult.

Existing laws do not prohibit all forms of trafficking. The 2006 Act Relating to the Transportation of Minors and the Suppression of Child Trafficking (act 2006–04) criminalizes child trafficking but focuses on movement of children rather than their ultimate exploitation and prescribes penalties of six months to two years imprisonment or fines if children are moved for the purpose of labor exploitation; these penalties are not sufficiently stringent. The penal code outlaws procuring or offering a person for prostitution and the facilitation of prostitution with punishments of six months to two years imprisonment. None of these punishments are sufficiently stringent or commensurate with punishments prescribed for other serious crimes. Comprehensive anti-trafficking legislation that would criminalize all forms of trafficking, including the trafficking of adults, has been pending MOJ review since September 2012.

The United States Department of State Office to Monitor and Combat Trafficking in Persons ranks Benin as a 'Tier 2' country.
