= Ilguilas Weila =

Ilguilas Weila is an anti-slavery human rights activist in Niger. He is president of the anti-slavery organization Timidria.

Ilguilas Weila and five other people were arrested on 28 April 2005 accused of trying to falsely elicit money, two billion CFA francs, from foreign donors. Four were released shortly afterwards but Weila and Alassane Biga were freed on bail by a Niger court on 17 June. He denies any wrongdoing. A demonstration was held on 19 May through the capital Niamey in protest at his arrest.

The charges came after a ceremony, in March, to release 7,000 slaves in the northern part of Tillabéri Region was cancelled at the last minute by the government who maintains slavery does not exist. At least 43,000 people are thought to live in subjugation across Niger, which officially banned slavery in May 2004. The matter is liable to embarrass the Nigerien president Tandja Mamadou who currently heads the Economic Community of West African States.

Much of Weila's work is devoted to informing people of their rights under the new law which are unknown in much of Niger owing to poverty, low literacy and the inaccessibility of many areas. Timidria gives literacy classes to freed slaves and also money so they can start a new life. It is these funds, provided partly by London-based Anti-Slavery International, that Weila is alleged to have stolen. Anti-Slavery International has written an open letter denying these claims. The organization has attempted to highlight Ilguilas Weila's work outside of Niger and he received their Anti-Slavery Award in November 2004.

Weila has criticised the ingrained nature of slavery in the region and questioned the role of religion "Islam assisted in the indoctrination of slaves through the use of religion, by saying for example if you disobey your master, you will not access paradise, hence your paradise is in the hands of your master," though Islam says no muslim can be a slave.
