= Ritual servitude =

Tradition of human beings as payment

Ritual servitude is a practice in Ghana, Togo, and Benin where traditional religious shrines (popularly called fetish shrines in Ghana) take human beings, usually young virgin girls, in payment for services or in religious atonement for alleged misdeeds of a family member. In Ghana and in Togo, it is practiced by the Ewe people in the Volta region; in Benin, it is practiced by the Fon.

These shrine slaves serve the priests, elders, and owners of a traditional religious shrine without remuneration and without their consent, although the consent of the family or clan may be involved. Those who practice ritual servitude usually feel that the girl is serving the god or gods of the shrine and is married to the gods of the shrine.

If a girl runs away or dies, she must be replaced by another girl from the family. Some girls in ritual servitude are the third or fourth girl in their family suffering for the same crime, sometimes for something as minor as the loss of trivial property.

This form of slavery is still practiced in the Volta Region in Ghana, despite being outlawed in 1998, and despite carrying a minimum three-year prison sentence for conviction. Among the Ewes who practice the ritual in Ghana, variations of the practice are also called trokosi, fiashidi, and woryokwe, with trokosi being the most common of those terms. In Togo and Benin it is called voodoosi or vudusi. Victims are commonly known in Ghana as fetish slaves because the gods of traditional African religions are popularly referred to as fetishes and the priests who serve them as fetish priests.

== Use of the terms "servitude", "slave" and "slavery" ==
Human rights organizations and other NGO's commonly use the words "servitude", "slaves", and "slavery" as non-technical, popularly understood terms that describe the reality of this practice. They point out that the practice meets all the commonly accepted definitions of slavery. Shrine slaves perform services which are not voluntary and are not paid. Their lives are totally controlled by the shrines, who in a sense become their owners.

Proponents of the system of ritual servitude by any of its names object to this term, but except for the technical terms "trokosi", "vudusi", "fiashidi", "woryokoe", the problem is coming up with a suitable alternative. Sometimes they have compared the trokosi to traditional queen mothers, implying a sense of respect for them, but one representative of an NGO who claims to have interviewed hundreds of participants reports that the participants themselves are offended at being called queens and insist they are/were simply slaves.

Juliana Dogbadzi, who served 17 years as a trokosi, says she was "slave to a fetish priest". Cudjoe Adzumah made a study of the practice in the Tongu Districts of Ghana and defined "trokosi" as "slaves of the gods".

Emmanuel Kwaku Akeampong, a native Ghanaian of Harvard University, says that "tro" means a "god" and "kosi" is used at different times to mean either "slave", "virgin", or "wife". Anita Ababio, a Ghanaian lawyer who has extensively researched the issue, explains that the Adangbe and Ga word, "woryokwe" comes from "won" meaning cult, and "yokwe", meaning "slave". Thus, she claims, a "woryokwe" is a "slave of a cult". Robert Kwame Amen in Ghana Studies also refers to trokosi as an institution of slavery. Likewise, Stephen Awudi Gadri, President of the Trokosi Abolition Fellowship of Ghana, and also himself from a shrine family, claims that trokosi are "slaves of the deities of the shrines". "Though euphemistically, they are called the 'deity's wives', yet they serve the priests and elders of the shrine and do all the hard chores, as well as becoming sexual partners of the priest", Gadri says. He also says, "the trokosi works for the priest without any form of remuneration whatsoever", and "it is a form of slavery". Ababio claims, "The servile status of the trokosi is seen in the duties they perform in the shrines, for which no payment is made...unfortunately for most trokosi, when they are freed they are still bound by rituals which keep them connected or attached to a shrine for life. Practically it means that these victims of ritual servitude always have the rights of ownership exercised over them." She then goes on to quote Article 7 of The Convention on Institutions and Practices Similar to Slavery, which defines a slave as "a person over whom any or all powers attaching to the rights of ownership are exercised". Angela Dwamena-Aboagye, a Ghanaian lawyer, says ritual servitude is "slavery, pure and simple. It violates every human right."

Some of the traditional priests also admit the trokosi are slaves. For example, Togbe Adzimashi Adukpo, a shrine priest, admitted in an interview with BBC in February 2001, "Yes, the girls are my slaves. They are the property of my shrine."

On the question of whether trokosi is a form of slavery and whether sexual abuse is involved the answers are polarized into two camps. Some traditionalists defend the system saying that it is simply a cultural practice of certain shrines and as such should be protected. These defenders claim that while instances of sexual abuse may occur, there is no evidence that sexual or physical abuse is an ingrained or systematic part of the practice. According to them, the practice explicitly forbids a trokosi to engage in sexual activity or contact. The other camp is represented by NGOs working with the trokosi and by former trokosi who have been liberated. These opponents of the practice have recorded testimony of hundreds of former (now liberated) trokosi who say that sexual abuse was a regular part of their time at the shrine, claiming the number of children born to them by the priest and shrine elders as evidence and witnesses.

Although virtually everyone recognizes that the victims themselves have no choice or say in their lot, Stephen Awudi Gadri says that "both the parents (of the victims) and the girls (that is, the victims) have no choice".

== Religious connections ==
Simon Abaxe has researched the practice in Ghana. He says that ritual servitude is part of African traditional religion in some places, but not a universal practice of that religion. A form of ritual servitude is also practiced in India and Nepal as part of Hindu religion called Devadasi, and various forms of it were part of ancient religious traditions of devotion to various gods and goddesses.

== Reasons ==
There are two major reasons for the practice of ritual servitude. Most common is the concept of atonement. A girl is given to the shrine or to the gods as a kind of "living sacrifice" to atone for the real or alleged crimes of a family member or ancestor, as discerned by the priest of the shrine. During a process of divination he calls on the gods of the shrine to reveal this information. Girls given to atone for such crimes in a sense are considered a kind of savior, for as long as she remains in the shrine or under its control, the anger of the god is believed to be averted from the rest of the family.

The second most frequent reason for the practice of ritual servitude is that the girl is given for the continuous repayment of the gods for services believed to have been obtained or favors believed to have been rendered from the shrine. Thus a girl may be given into ritual servitude when someone believes a child has been conceived or a person has been healed, for example, through the intervention of the shrine.

Proponents of the practice claim that some participants choose a life of ritual servitude of their own volition, but human rights organizations claim that while this may be theoretically possible, they haven't found one yet.

In the past, the traditions of the shrines were veiled in secrecy, and people dared not discuss them, fearing the wrath of the gods if they dared to do so. For this reason, the practice was neither widely known nor well understood. In more recent times, since the 1990s at least, abolitionists and human rights advocates have penetrated the veil of secrecy. The issue has been widely discussed, for instance, in the newspapers and on the radio in Ghana.

== Origin and history ==
=== In the Dahomey Empire ===
The giving of virgin girls to the gods was part of many ancient religions. In West Africa, the practice has gone on for at least several hundred years. Similar practices using similar terminology were found in the royal court of the Kingdom of Dahomey (in what is now Benin) in the 18th and 19th centuries. Wives, slaves, and in fact all persons connected with the royal palace of Dahomey were called ahosi, from aho meaning "king", and si meaning "dependent" or "subordinate". In Gbe languages, aho means widow and the suffix si or shi means female so ahosi literally means widow. Ahosi started as group of wives of departed kings in the kingdom of Dahomey. The death of the monarch usually leaves behind his wives and concubines who the new king may not take fancy to as they may be too old for him to fancy. By one estimate there were 5,000 to 7,000 ahosi living in the palace at Abomey, and no men lived there except for a few hundred eunuchs were charged with controlling the women. After sunset no men at all were allowed in the palace except the king, and he was guarded by women guards called Amazons. The king controlled every aspect of the lives and even the deaths of the ahosi. Visitors to old Abomey today are shown a mass grave and told that the king's wives "volunteered", on his death, to be buried alive with him in order to accompany him and serve him in the world to come. One researcher pointed out, "Of course, one should not make the mistake of ascribing modern democratic meaning to the word "volunteered" as if the wives wanted to die or had any choice in the matter". Ahosi who became too powerful or too independently minded were simply sacrificed (literally and physically) in the annual office ceremony lasting several days in which the power of the king was renewed by hundreds of human sacrifices, usually performed by public beheadings.

The practice was documented by A. B. Ellis who was an eyewitness of the practice in the Dahomey Empire (now Benin) in 1879. According to Ellis, one god called "Khebioso" (Heviosso, God of thunder and lightning) had 1500 wives in Dahomey alone, the women being called "kosiwo” (poor females). He said they cared for the shrines of the gods, but their main business was religious prostitution. According to Ellis, most of the gods of the Ewe-speaking people at that time had such women who were similarly consecrated to their service and were commonly considered "wives" of the gods.

One might argue that those ahosi were wives of the king and lived in the palace, not wives of the gods living in the shrines. But that distinction is not as clearcut as it might first seem, for the palace was the center of Dahomean religious life, and the place where sacrifices were made and rituals to the ancestors were performed. Over time, then, it was an easy jump from being ahosi living lives totally controlled by the king in the palace where sacrifices were offered and rituals were performed, to being trokosi living lives totally controlled by a priest in a shrine where sacrifices were offered and rituals were performed. Even in the time of the Kingdom of Dahomey, one reads of the vodun or gods successfully demanding that someone become a devotee or vodunsi (wife or follower of the god).

=== In Ghana ===
As people migrated within West Africa, the practice spread. Sandra Greene has noted that in Ghana, the practice dates to at least the late 18th century. At the time the Amlade clan Sui became very powerful, and began to demand female slaves from those who sought its services. The practice called "replacement" also began in Ghana at that time. Under this practice, if a shrine slave died or ran away, the family was required to replace her with another girl. At the beginning of the 19th century, Nyigbla became the chief Anlo deity, and its shrines also began to demand slaves for its services. Involuntary slavery, however, was not at that time and in that place common, since Nyigbla also instituted a practice called foasi, whereby two servants were recruited annually on a more-or-less voluntary basis. At that time, the slaves were often married to members of powerful priestly families.

== History of opposition to the practice ==
=== In colonial times ===
When Ghana (then Gold Coast) was under colonial rule, a few citizens complained about the practice, but the colonial masters turned their heads. They derided them as "the blind men who wanted to help others see". The colonial government did investigate the practice at Atigo shrine near Battor from 1919 to 1924. The investigating District Commissioner, W. Price Jones, called it "a pernicious habit of handing girls over to the fetish", but for economic reasons, decided not to interfere. As a result of that inquiry, shrine slaves held at the Atigo shrine were told they could return home if they wished. Soon after, the colonial government ignored another complaint that the shrine was still keeping trokosi. After that, the practice slid back into secrecy and was not brought to the public consciousness again until 1980.

=== In the 1980s ===
The practice was drawn into the national spotlight at that time when Mark Wisdom, a Baptist pastor, responded to what he claims was a vision from God, and challenged the system in the national media. Wisdom claimed that as he prayed, he saw a vision of women in bonds, crying out for help. Wisdom claimed to have later discovered these same women on one of his evangelistic missions, held in bondage in a shrine just across the Volta River from his home, but previously unknown to him. He began publicly denouncing the practice, so much so that headlines in Ghana screamed that he was not afraid of the shrine priests. Wisdom wrote a book on the subject, founded FESLIM (Fetish Slaves Liberation Movement), and was instrumental in some of the earliest liberations, but it was his bold public statements reported in the news that pricked the national consciousness.

=== In the 1990s ===
In the early 1990s, Ghanaian journalist Vincent Azumah found courage to write publicly about the practice and sparked a nationwide debate. Then the International Federation of Women Lawyers in Ghana (FIDA) organized an investigation into shrine practices and issued a report in 1992. These events took place while Jerry Rawlings still held the presidency of Ghana with an iron fist. Rawlings and his administration were defenders of African Traditional Religion, calling it the "African Heritage" and a cause for national pride. One example of this was his granting of free air time to the founder of the Afrikania movement, Okomfo Damuah, at a time when Christian churches were virtually denied access to both radio and TV. Azumah and FIDA's actions were very bold in the light of the political climate of the day.

The Ghana National Commission on Children brought attention to the issue during the celebration of the Organization of African Unity Day of the African Child on June 16, 1993. In 1994 and 1995 Ghanaian lawyer Anita Heymann Ababio researched the practice in the light of Ghanaian law, and recommendations from this research later became a Law Reform Commission report to the Ghana government in 1995. According to Emmanuel Kweku Akeampong, a Ghanaian professor of history at Harvard University, the practice of trokosi received significant national attention in Ghana in 1996 and 1997.

=== Outlawing in Ghana ===
In 1998, the Law Reform Commission of Ghana, drawing on the recommendations of Ababio and others, drafted a law specifying "ritual or customary servitude" as a crime. The law passed, requiring a mandatory three-year prison term for those found guilty.

=== International award 1999 ===
In 1999, Juliana Dogbadzi, a former trokosi, won the Reebok Human Rights Award for her efforts in speaking up on behalf of her fellow trokosi.

=== Opposition by NGOs ===
Although the practice was outlawed in Ghana in 1998, it continued due to fear and the reluctance of the government to interfere with traditional practices. Some NGOs had already worked to liberate shrines, but after the law did not solve the problem, NGOs began to get even more seriously involved in advocating against the practice and in working for agreements to reduce the practice by liberating individual shrines.

Some of the organizations that have joined the effort are UNICEF, International Needs Network Ghana, the Swiss "Sentry Movement", the Trokosi Abolition Fellowship, the Anti-Slavery Society, and Every Child Ministries. Survivors for Change is a group of former trokosi who have banded together to speak up against the practice. Organizations that have been most active in liberating ritual slaves are FESLIM (Fetish Slaves Liberation Movement), founded by Mark Wisdom, International Needs, and Every Child Ministries. Christian NGOs and human rights organizations have been fighting it—working to end the practice and to win liberation for the shrine slaves. They have carried out their activities with strong support from CHRAJ—the Commission on Human Rights and Administrative Justice—and the Ministry of Women's and Children's Affairs. A Court of Women was organized in Accra in 2003 to continue the fight against the practice.

== Meaning of "Trokosi" and "Vudusi" ==
The word trokosi comes from the Ewe-Gbe words "tro", meaning deity or fetish, and "kosi", meaning female slave. "Ko" denotes poverty and "si" denotes female.

"Vudusi", pronounced "vudushi", means female adherent of voodoo religion. The "tro" deity is not, according to African traditional religion, the Creator or what might be called the "High" or Ultimate God. "Tro" refers to what African Traditional Religion calls the "small gods" or "lesser deities"—spirits of nature, etc. which are venerated in traditional religion. The term trokosi is commonly used in English in Ghana as a loanword.

=== Categories of Tro adherents ===
- Those who join the Tro of their own volition (extremely rare) and those who were born to women associated with the Tro and initiated as children (Trovivo);
- Those thought to have been born through the intervention of the Tro (Dorfleviwo) (those used to buy the womb) and thus incur a lifetime obligation of servitude to the tro;
- Those allegedly called by the tro to serve as priest and priestesses of the shrine (Tronua);
- Those who were forced to become Trokosi to repay the Tro because their family supposedly benefited from it.
- Those Trokosi who are sent by families, often against the will of the girl involved, out of fear that if they do not do so, further calamities may afflict them through the anger of the shrine deities. This last group consists of those virgins who are sent into servitude at the shrines of the Troxovi due to crimes allegedly committed by their senior or elder family members, almost always males like fathers, grandfathers, and uncles. The trokosi is sort of a "living sacrifice," who by her suffering is thought to save the family from trouble.

Opponents of the practice claim that all except those who joined of their own volition are virtually slaves in every normal sense of the word.

NGO's point out that practices in traditional shrines vary, but trokosi are usually denied education, suffer a life of hardship, and are a lonely lot, stigmatized by society.

The period of servitude varies from a few months to life. In some cases it involves payment of a heavy fine to the shrine, which can require many years of hard labor or even a lifetime of service to pay. In shrines where the period of servitude is limited, after a ritual and sometimes after months or years in the shrine, the Trokosi returns to her family, but her life is still controlled by the shrine for the rest of her life. Supporters of the practice claim that in the vast majority of cases, there is no particular stigma attached to one's status as a former Trokosi shrine participant. NGOs working to rehabilitate former trokosi say that the social stigma is immense and that it is the most enduring and difficult aspect of the practice.

== Main variations in the practice ==
Ritual slavery shows a high degree of cohesiveness, but there are many significant differences as it is practiced in various shrines and in various areas. Every Child Ministries, a Christian NGO that has done much research on the topic, lists these as variations that they have observed in their work:

=== Entry age of the participants ===
Most frequently those in ritual servitude are young virgin girls at the time of entry into the shrine. Of course, the girls grow up, so where their servitude is long or lifetime, the participants are of all ages.

=== Length of service ===
There are two basic lengths of service—perpetual or lifetime service and limited service. One traditional priest expressed the view that once a crime had been committed, it had to be atoned for until the end of time. This is the view of lifetime or perpetual service. Shrine slaves serving for a lifetime have no hope of ever getting free unless outsiders intervene on their behalf. In some shrines, in some areas, and for some alleged crimes, the service is limited to a specific number of years. In other cases, a substantial fee is exacted from the shrine slave or her family. The girls work to try to earn that fee, but in reality the fee is so high and their means of paying it so low that there is virtually no hope of ever paying off the debt that has been laid on them. Some shrines have taken so many slaves that they cannot contain them all. Some slaves become unattractive or unuseful to the priest. In these cases trokosia may be given what is called "temporary" release. This is actually a misnomer, since it is a permanent condition. The temporary part only gives the slave permission to live outside the shrine temporarily. All the important decisions of her life are still controlled by the shrine, she is still at the beck and call of the priest, and she has to serve at the annual festival of the god every year, for which she is required to bring gifts that may take her all year to accumulate. One child of a trokosi on "temporary release" said, "whenever my mother goes fishing or does any work, she must divide it into three, with two parts going to the priest."

=== Practice of replacement ===
Where perpetual or lifetime servitude is practiced, the shrines often, but not always, practice what they call "replacement." when a trokosi or vudusi dies or runs away, she has to be replaced by another virgin from the same family or clan. Some human rights interviewers report that they have interviewed numerous girls who were the third or fourth replacements for their families for a crime that was allegedly committed long ago.

=== Practice of rape by the priest and elders of the shrine ===
In most shrines it is considered a duty of the shrine slaves to have obligatory sex with the priest and sometimes the elders. The priest's genital organs have been dedicated to the gods of the shrine, so having sex with him is considered a sacred act - in a sense, copulating with the gods. This is the origin and meaning of the term "wives of the gods." Many trokosi and vudusi have described beatings and other severe punishments imposed on them for refusing sex with the priest. In Ghana, human rights organizations monitoring the practice of "trokosi" claim that shrine slaves often end up with an average of four children while in servitude, many of them by the priest or elders of the shrines. Proponents of ritual servitude deny that this is a part of the practice. There seem to be wide differences between practices in different districts, but Rouster claims that the problem of forced sex in many of the shrines is too well documented to be disputed. Stephen Awudi Gadri, founder of Trokosi Abolition Fellowship, speaks of "ritual violation after menarche" (first menses) as the beginning of a life of coerced sex. He refers to the trokosi as "vestal virgins."

=== Treatment of shrine slaves ===
Treatment of girls in the shrine varies as to feeding practices, reasons for and severity of punishments, sleeping and living conditions. Severe and widespread problems have been documented in all these areas by human rights organizations. Many of the shrine slaves are required to do heavy physical labor like cultivating fields with a hand hoe. Other common duties are weaving mats, making and selling firewood (with all profits going to the priest or the shrine), fetching wood and water, sweeping the compound and attending the images of the gods. It is also known that the priests of the shrine will sleep with the slaves and ferminate them. This is a barbaric act.

== Liberation of shrine slaves ==
NGO's and other human rights organizations are fighting the practice. Since the 1990s, these groups have actively sought to liberate girls held in ritual servitude. Liberation has been done on a shrine-by-shrine basis, with NGO's seeking to reach community-wide agreements that all the slaves of a particular shrine will be liberated and the practice of slavery or ritual servitude will be permanently ended in that place. When such an agreement is reached, a public ceremony is held for the signing of the documents and often, liberation certificates for the former slaves. The shrine is compensated for its loss and the former trokosi begin a process of rehabilitation which usually includes learning vocational skills.

The most active groups in liberating shrine slaves through negotiated community agreements have been FESLIM, Fetish Slaves Liberation Movement, International Needs Network, and Every Child Ministries.

The first liberation ceremonies were held at Lomo and Me shrines in Volo in October 1996, at three shrines in Dorfor in December 1996, and at Atigo shrine in Battor in January 1997. International Needs Network liberated 400 trokosi from a group of small shrines in November 2000, and 126 at Adidome in November 2001. Every Child Ministries cooperated with International Needs Network to liberate 465 trokosi from three shrines of the Agave area in January 2003 and with Fetish Slaves Liberation Movement to liberate 94 shrine slaves from Aklidokpo shrine near Adidome in January 2004. They continued the effort, liberating 120 from Sovigbenor shrine in Aflao in December 2005, and 52 "yevesi" or servants of the thunder god from the Kadza Yevesi Shrine at Aflao in March 2010. Shrines of the Anlo clan in Ghana also hold trokosi, but have resisted liberation and defended the practice, defending their practice of trokosi as being more humane than the practices of other districts. Human rights organizations insist that the practice must be totally eradicated.

== Similar practices in other countries ==
- Devdasi in India and Nepal
- Sexual slavery
- Sacred prostitution
- Child slavery
