= Human trafficking in Togo =

In 2008, Togo was a source, transit and, to a lesser extent, a destination country for women and children trafficked for the purposes of forced labor and commercial sexual exploitation. Trafficking within Togo was more prevalent than transnational trafficking and the majority of victims are children. Togolese girls were trafficked primarily within the country for domestic servitude, as market vendors, produce porters, and for commercial sexual exploitation. To a lesser extent, girls were also trafficked to other African countries, primarily Benin, Nigeria, Ghana, and Niger for the same purposes listed above. Togolese boys were most commonly trafficked transnationally to work in agricultural labor in other African countries, primarily Nigeria, Ivory Coast, Gabon, and Benin, though some boys are also trafficked within the country for market labor. Beninese and Ghanaian children have also been trafficked to Togo. There have been reports of Togolese women and girls trafficked to Lebanon and Saudi Arabia, likely for domestic servitude and sexual exploitation. Togolese women may have been trafficked to Europe, primarily to France and Germany, for domestic servitude and sexual exploitation. In 2007, 19 Togolese girls and young women were trafficked to the United States for forced labor in a hair salon. The Government of Togo does not fully comply with the minimum standards for the elimination of trafficking; however, it made significant efforts to do so, despite limited resources. Togo demonstrated solid law enforcement efforts by increasing the number of traffickers convicted. However, sentences imposed on convicted traffickers were inadequate and protection efforts were diminished over last year.

The country ratified the 2000 UN TIP Protocol in May 2009.

In 2017, the U.S. State Department's Office to Monitor and Combat Trafficking in Persons placed the country in "Tier 2 Watch List" in 2018 - a downgrade from the year before. The country was at Tier 2 in 2023.

In 2023, the Organised Crime Index noted that while some state officials played a role in carrying out this crime, the country had made progress in fighting it, including setting up a National Action Plan in 2021 with rehabilitation centres for child victims.

== Prosecution (2008) ==
The Government of Togo demonstrated sustained law enforcement efforts to combat trafficking during the last year. Togo does not prohibit all forms of trafficking, though in July 2007, the government enacted a Child Code that criminalizes all forms of child trafficking. This law supplements Togo's 2005 Law Related to Child Trafficking, which criminalizes the trafficking of children, but provides a weak definition of trafficking and fails to prohibit child sexual exploitation. Togo's maximum prescribed penalty of 10 years' imprisonment for child labor trafficking is sufficiently stringent. The prescribed penalties of one to five years' imprisonment for sex trafficking of children 15 years and older and 10 years' imprisonment for sex trafficking of children younger than 15 years are sufficiently stringent and commensurate with penalties prescribed for statutory rape. On June 15, 2007 five traffickers were convicted in the northern cities of Kara and Sokode. They were sentenced to penalties of one to two years' imprisonment, and some also paid a fine of $2,000 each, five times Togo's per capita income. In September 2007, Togolese and American officials worked together to expel an American accused of child sex tourism from Togo. In 2007, with support from UNICEF, the government organized four five-day workshops and provided some instructors to train 108 law enforcement officials, including magistrates, police, gendarmerie, military and customs officers, on strategies for enforcing laws against child trafficking. The government relies largely on ILO-funded local vigilance committees, usually composed of local government officials, community leaders, and youth, to report trafficking cases.

== Protection (2008) ==
The Togolese government demonstrated modest efforts to protect trafficking victims over the last year. Togolese law enforcement officials regularly referred trafficking victims to government authorities or NGOs for care. The Ministry of Social Affairs, the Ministry of Child Protection, and The National Committee for the Reception and Reinsertion of Trafficked Children assisted victims primarily by alerting two NGOs in Lomé that provide immediate victim care, and by working with these organizations to return victims to their home communities. In 2007, however, the Minister of Child Protection also established a vocational training center for destitute children where the government has placed some trafficking victims before returning them to their families. The government reported that it referred 224 trafficking victims to one NGO in Lomé during the year and that 56 Togolese victims trafficked abroad were intercepted and repatriated in 2007. Neither the government nor NGOs provide any care for male victims older than 15 years. The government sometimes encourages victims to assist in trafficking investigations or prosecutions on an ad hoc basis. The government does not provide legal alternatives to the removal of foreign victims to countries where they face hardship or retribution; however the majority of victims are Togolese. Victims are not inappropriately incarcerated or fined for unlawful acts as a direct result of being trafficked.

== Prevention (2008) ==
The Government of Togo made steady efforts to raise awareness about trafficking during the reporting period. With UNICEF support, in 2007 the government organized a trafficking training for journalists. With assistance from UNICEF, ILO, and local NGOs, the government also developed a national action plan to combat trafficking and a manual on trafficking victim protection procedures. Local government officials continued to play an active role as members of ILO-funded local anti-trafficking committees to raise awareness of trafficking by organizing skits and radio announcements in local language. Togolese troops deployed abroad as part of peacekeeping missions receive some trafficking awareness training prior to their deployment. Although the 2005 anti-trafficking law called for a National Committee to Combat Trafficking, this coordinating body has not yet been established. Togo did not take measures to reduce demand for commercial sex acts.
