= Wahaya =

Type of exual slavery in Niger and Nigeria

Wahaya is a practice whereby girls and women are bought as unofficial wives and are called fifth wives, whereby they have none of the legal rights that legal wives have, as the maximum number of wives allowed by Islam is four. A wahaya is a female slave bought by a male. It is a common practice in Niger and Nigeria. It is a modern form of slavery as these girls and women are used for sexual gratification and domestic and rural labor. Despite the fact that slavery has been criminalized in 2003, wahaya is a form of sexual and labor slavery that is still maintained in Niger. For Islam, the maximum number of wives allowed is four, which is why this practice is also called fifth wife.

Wahaya are girls and women bought and exploited as property by wealthy religious leaders or political dignitaries to be used as free labor and for the sexual gratification of their masters, who assault them at will when they are not with their lawful wives. A woman cannot buy a wahaya because sexual exploitation is implicit in the term. A wahaya is usually acquired through sale by her master or mistress once she reaches puberty, around the age of 12. Once sold, the wahaya must move in with her master's family and work for him and his wives without remuneration.

In the Tahoua region, it has become a sign of wealth among dignitaries, traders and large farmers and herdsmen. Since Islam prohibits having more than four wives and forbids having female slaves, a Muslim man can have up to four legal wives and then acquire any number of "fifth wives". It is a way of circumventing Islamic law.

== See also ==
- Concubinage in Islam
