= Human trafficking in Benin =

Human trafficking in Benin is a significant issue, with the country serving as a source, transit, and destination point for victims. Traffickers often exploit vulnerable women and children from impoverished northern regions, transporting them to urban centers in the south for forced labour or sexual exploitation. Domestic trafficking is more prevalent than cross-border cases, though Beninese victims have been identified in countries such as Nigeria, Gabon, and the Republic of the Congo.

== Reports ==
=== U.S. Department of State's Trafficking in Persons Report ===
The 2023 Trafficking in Persons Report highlighted that the Beninese government identified 1,451 trafficking victims, comprising 1,214 labour trafficking victims and 237 victims of unspecified forms of trafficking.

=== United Nations Office on Drugs and Crime (UNODC) ===
According to a UNODC report, Benin established the specific offense of child trafficking in 2006. However, the law did not cover trafficking in persons above the age of 18, indicating a gap in the legal framework addressing adult trafficking.

=== Verité's Assessment on Supply Chains ===
Verité, an organization focusing on labour rights, reported that girls were exploited in sex trafficking in urban areas of Benin. Additionally, criminal groups had been identified as traffickers of women and children for various exploitative purposes.

=== ECPAT International ===
ECPAT International noted that Benin was the largest source country for trafficking victims in the Republic of Congo. The organization also reported cases of sexual exploitation of children in travel and tourism involving both girls and boys in regions such as Mono and along the shores of the Bight of Benin.

=== Organized Crime Index ===
The Organized Crime Index observed that efforts to support victims of organized crime in Benin have primarily focused on child victims of human trafficking, with less attention given to adult victims. Social services have referred child victims to temporary shelters offering legal, medical, and psychological assistance, while NGOs have collaborated with the government to reunite children with their families.

== Prevalence ==
Human trafficking remains a significant concern in Benin, affecting both children and adults across various forms of exploitation. In 2023, the U.S. Department of State reported that the Beninese government identified 1,451 trafficking victims, including 1,214 individuals subjected to labor trafficking and 237 victims of unspecified forms of trafficking.

The exploitation of children is particularly alarming. According to the U.S. Department of Labor, children in Benin are involved in hazardous activities such as selling smuggled gasoline on roadsides and illegally selling alcohol, cigarettes, and pharmaceutical products on the street.

Benin serves as both a source and transit country for human trafficking. Traffickers often exploit vulnerable women and children from impoverished northern regions, transporting them to urban centers in the south for forced labor or sexual exploitation. The Dantokpa market in Cotonou is notorious for child labor, with children as young as five engaged in various forms of exploitation.

== Types ==
=== Forced labour ===
Many victims, particularly children from rural areas, are subjected to forced labour. They are often recruited under false pretenses and exploited in sectors such as domestic servitude, agriculture, markets, and handicraft manufacturing. Children living in lakeside areas, including the commune of So Ava in southeast Benin, have been reported to be exploited in debt bondage. Additionally, some Quranic schools in northern Benin exploit their students, known as talibé, in forced begging.

=== Sex trafficking ===
Both women and children are vulnerable to sex trafficking in Benin. Criminals have been reported to exploit girls in sex trafficking within urban centers such as Cotonou and Malanville. Furthermore, reports indicate that girls are trafficked into Benin for sexual exploitation.

=== International trafficking ===
Beninese children are trafficked to neighboring countries such as Nigeria, Gabon, and the Republic of the Congo for domestic servitude and other forms of forced labor. Conversely, individuals from countries like Togo transit through Benin en route to other destinations.

== Structural factors ==
=== Cultural practices ===
Certain cultural practices have been misused to facilitate trafficking. The traditional system of vidomegon involves sending children to wealthier families for educational or vocational opportunities; however, some of these children are subjected to forced labour or sexual exploitation. Additionally, the practice of trokosi, prevalent in parts of Benin, involves young virgins being sent to shrines to atone for family transgressions, where they live as slaves to the priests, performing labor and sometimes subjected to sexual exploitation.

=== Educational limitations ===
Limited access to quality education in certain areas leaves children without essential skills and knowledge, making them more vulnerable to exploitation. The lack of educational opportunities diminishes alternatives to child labor and increases the risk of trafficking.

=== Gender inequality ===
Societal norms that marginalize women and girls contribute to their increased vulnerability to trafficking. Discriminatory practices limit access to education and economic opportunities, making women and girls more susceptible to exploitation.

=== Weak legal frameworks and enforcement ===
Although Benin has ratified international protocols against human trafficking, gaps in national legislation and inconsistent enforcement hinder effective prevention and prosecution efforts. The absence of comprehensive laws addressing all forms of trafficking allows perpetrators to exploit legal loopholes.

== Anti-trafficking laws and policies ==
=== Legal framework ===
In December 2018, Benin enacted a new penal code that criminalizes all forms of labor trafficking and certain forms of sex trafficking. Articles of the penal code prescribe penalties ranging from 10 to 20 years' imprisonment for these offenses.

==== Law enforcement actions ====
The government has demonstrated efforts to enforce anti-trafficking laws. In 2023, authorities reportedly prosecuted 176 individuals for trafficking offenses, including 101 for sex trafficking, three for forced labor, and 72 for unspecified forms of trafficking.

=== International commitments ===
Benin is a signatory to the United Nations Convention against Transnational Organized Crime and its supplementary Protocol to Prevent, Suppress and Punish Trafficking in Persons, Especially Women and Children. These international instruments commit Benin to adopting measures to prevent trafficking, protect victims, and prosecute offenders.

==== Regional cooperation ====
Benin has entered into law enforcement cooperation agreements with neighboring countries, including Nigeria, Togo, and Burkina Faso, to combat human trafficking. These agreements facilitate cross-border collaboration in addressing trafficking networks.

=== Training and capacity building ===
To enhance the effectiveness of law enforcement and judicial personnel, Benin has collaborated with international organizations. For instance, the United Nations Office on Drugs and Crime organized training workshops for magistrates and investigators focusing on the investigation, prosecution, and adjudication of trafficking-related offenses.

== Consequences of human trafficking ==
=== Health impact ===
Victims of human trafficking in Benin experience severe physical and psychological health issues due to the exploitative conditions they endure. Common health problems include:

- Physical health issues: Victims often suffer from injuries resulting from physical abuse, malnutrition, and exposure to hazardous working environments. These conditions can lead to chronic illnesses and long-term physical impairments.
- Mental health disorders: The psychological toll of trafficking is significant, with survivors frequently experiencing depression, anxiety, post-traumatic stress disorder, and suicidal ideation. Studies have shown high prevalence rates of these mental health conditions among trafficking survivors.

=== Economic impact ===
The economic consequences of human trafficking in Benin are substantial, affecting both individuals and the national economy:

- Loss of human capital: Trafficking deprives communities of productive individuals, particularly the youth, hindering economic development and perpetuating cycles of poverty.
- Strain on social services: The government and non-governmental organizations allocate significant resources to rescue, rehabilitate, and reintegrate trafficking survivors. These efforts place a financial burden on social service systems and divert funds from other critical areas.
- Undermining economic growth: The exploitation associated with human trafficking contributes to an informal economy that operates outside legal frameworks, reducing tax revenues and undermining legitimate economic activities.

== History ==
=== Transatlantic slave trade ===
Between the 17th and 19th centuries, the Kingdom of Dahomey, located in present-day Benin, was a central hub in the transatlantic slave trade. The kingdom engaged in capturing and selling individuals to European traders, with the coastal region becoming known as the "Slave Coast" due to the high volume of enslaved people exported. By the mid-18th century, the King of Dahomey was reportedly earning substantial revenue from this trade. The capital city, Porto-Novo, was originally developed as a port for slave trading.

=== Colonial and Post-Colonial periods ===
Following the abolition of the transatlantic slave trade in the 19th century, the region experienced shifts in its socio-economic structures. However, practices resembling slavery persisted, with forced labour and exploitation continuing under colonial rule and into the post-independence era. Traditional systems, such as the "vidomegon" practice, where children were sent to live with wealthier families for education or work, were sometimes misused, leading to situations of exploitation.
