= Timidria =

Timidria is the name of an NGO for human rights in Niger, founded by Ilguilas Weila. Timidria is dedicated to the eradication of slavery in Niger.

Timidria was formed in 1991 and the name means 'solidarity' in Tamajaq. Niger's government denies the existence of slavery in the country, but international human rights organizations estimate the number of slaves in Niger at approximately 40,000.

The headquarters of Timidria is in the capital Niamey, and the organization has offices all around the country, helping escaped slaves to build up a new life in freedom.
