= Moussa Tchangari =

Nigerien Journalist

- Born: Niger
- Citizenship: Nigerien
- Occupation: Journalist

Moussa Tchangari is a Nigerien journalist, civil society leader, and human rights defender. He is the Secretary-General of Alternative Escapes Citoyens (Citizens' Alternative Spaces), a civic organization in Niger. He is involved in issues including governance, human rights, and military intervention in Niger and the Sahel region.

== Career ==
Tchangari began his career in the 1990s been active in Nigerien media and civil society. He serves as the Secretary-General of Alternative Espaces Citoyens (AEC), a civic organization in Niamey that promotes public education on governance and rights.

As a leader in Alternative Escapes Citoyens, he has organized community radio programs, civic forums, and advocacy campaigns. Tchangari has also published commentary on Niger's democratic development and the security situation in the Sahel.

== Arrests ==
In 2015, Tchangari was arrested for his criticism of his government's response to Boko Haram Insurgents and the effect of insurgency on civilian population. His release was facilitated after support from international organizations, including Amnesty International and Reporters Without Borders.

On December 3, 2024, Tchangari was arrested at his home in Niamey by plain-clothed officers. He was later charged with “criminal association in connection with a terrorist enterprise,” “undermining national defence,” and “intelligence with enemy powers.” These charges emerged following his public critiques of recent military governance policies and his advocacy against the repression of civic space.

Tchangari remains imprisoned in Filingué, as of 2026. Transparency International Niger and the Association for the Fight against Corruption (l’Association nigérienne de lutte contre la corruption, ANLC-TI) denounced his arrest and continued incarceration in April 2025 and called for his immediate release.

On 23 June 2026, the United Nations Working Group on Arbitrary Detention found that Tchangari's detention was arbitrary and violated international human rights law.
