= Human trafficking in Gabon =

Gabon ratified the 2000 UN TIP Protocol in September 2010.

Gabon is primarily a transit country for children from Benin, Nigeria, Togo, Mali, Guinea, and other West African countries who are subjected to human trafficking, specifically forced labor and forced prostitution. Some victims transit through Gabon en route to exploitation in Equatorial Guinea. According to UNICEF, the majority of victims are boys who are forced to work as street hawkers or mechanics. Girls generally are subjected to conditions of involuntary domestic servitude, or forced labor in markets or roadside restaurants. Stepped-up coastal surveillance over the past year – especially following the October 2009 arrival in Gabonese waters of a sea vessel that was carrying 34 child trafficking victims, some of whom were destined for Equatorial Guinea – caused traffickers to change their routes, which included utilizing estuaries and rivers to transport children. The majority of victims in that incident were young girls, a departure from previous patterns of trafficking in the region. Trafficking offenders appear to operate in loose ethnic-based crime networks. Some child traffickers are women, who serve as intermediaries in their countries of origin. In some cases, child victims report that their parents had turned them over to intermediaries promising employment opportunities in Gabon. The government has no reports of international organized crime syndicates, employment agencies, marriage brokers, or travel services facilitating trafficking in Gabon. In 2009, the government began tracking a new trend of young adults between ages 18 and 25 being forced into domestic servitude or prostitution in Gabon.

In 2010, the Government of Gabon did not fully comply with what the U.S. government considers to be minimum standards for the elimination of trafficking; however, it made significant efforts to do so. Despite these efforts - most notably the arrests of seven suspected traffickers and the expansion of protection services for child victims of trafficking - the government did not show evidence of increasing efforts to address trafficking. Specifically, the government, for another consecutive year, did not provide information on prosecutions or convictions of traffickers, despite the arrest of over 30 suspected offenders between 2003 and 2008. Because of this, Gabon was placed on the Tier 2 Watch List for the third consecutive year.

The U.S. State Department's Office to Monitor and Combat Trafficking in Persons placed the country in "Tier 2 Watchlist" in 2017 and 2023.

In 2023, the Organised Crime Index noted an increase in the trafficking of newborn babies in the country.

== Prosecution (2010) ==
The Government of Gabon has demonstrated limited progress in anti-human trafficking law enforcement efforts. Gabon has several laws regarding forms of human trafficking. Law 09/04, enacted in September 2004, is used to protect children against sex or labor trafficking in Gabon. The law prescribes penalties of 5 to 15 years of imprisonment, along with fines of $20,000 to $40,000. The procurement of a child for the purpose of prostitution is prohibited under Penal Code Article 261, which prescribes 2 to 5 years of imprisonment and a fine. Forced prostitution of adults is prohibited by law 21/63-94, which prescribes 2 to 10 years of imprisonment. During 2010, the government reported seven arrests for trafficking, but did not provide details of the cases. The government also did not report any trafficking prosecutions or convictions during the year. In February 2010, three suspected traffickers were arrested on the border trying to bring 18 young adults from Cameroon, Mali, Burkina Faso, and Guinea into Gabon. The suspects remain jailed as the investigation continues. As the Criminal Court maintained its calendar providing for only one meeting per year, and for one week, suspected trafficking offenders typically waited in jail for trials, and received credit for time served.

== Protection (2010) ==
The Government of Gabon showed progress in its efforts to ensure that victims of trafficking received access to necessary protective services. Government personnel employed procedures to identify victims of trafficking among vulnerable groups, such as migrant children, and referred them systematically to government or NGO shelters. In responding a vessel in Gabon waters, authorities identified the 34 children aboard the vessel (among 285 others) as trafficking victims and took steps to provide them with assistance. The government coordinated the repatriation of the vessel's victims to their countries of origin with the concerned governments.

In direct support of victim protection measures, the government spent approximately $270,000 to support three centers offering foster care to child victims of trafficking in Libreville and Port-Gentil. One of the centers is completely government-funded, while the other two are financed partly by the government through material donations and social worker access, and partly through others. These centers provided shelter, medical care, education, and rehabilitation services, as well as psychosocial services to educate victims on asserting their rights. The government provided temporary de facto resident status for trafficking victims, and refrained from deporting them. The government also began rehabilitation of two more centers, and opened more child protection centers in Franceville, Moanda and Tchibanga. The government also opened six centers for street children and the Ministry of Interior operated two transit centers for illegal immigrants - an alternative to jail.

== Prevention (2010) ==
The Gabonese government made some efforts to prevent human trafficking during 2010. In 2009, as the first step in its effort to improve targeting of its prevention messages, it surveyed 2,500 residents to examine the public's understanding of violence against children, including trafficking. In accordance with the survey findings, an outreach campaign aimed at identifying child victims of violence will begin. In his effort to increase awareness, the country's President raised the topic of trafficking in Council of Ministers meetings. Also in 2009, the government monitored migration patterns for evidence of trafficking to Gabon. The government stepped up its efforts to enhance maritime security through aerial surveillance. An inter-Ministerial Committee to Combat Child Trafficking was created by Law 09/04. The inter-ministerial committee published and distributed leaflets and posters entitled “STOP child exploitation” to highlight forms and consequences of trafficking and its hotline number. Heavy government press coverage of anti-trafficking training sponsored by a foreign government helped raise awareness of victim identification and law enforcement responses. The government did not take action during 2010 to reduce the demand for commercial sex acts. However, the commercial sex trade is not a widespread problem in Gabon.
