= Niger =

Country in West Africa

Republic of the Niger Jamhuriyar Nijar
- Flag Coat of arms
- Motto: Yan'uwantaka, Aiki, Ci gaba (Hausa) "Fraternity, Work, Progress"
- Anthem: L'Honneur de la Patrie (French) "The Honour of the Fatherland"
- Capital and largest city: Niamey; 13°30′49″N 2°06′32″E
- Official languages: Hausa
- Ethnic groups (2001): 55.4% Hausa; 21% Zarma and Songhay; 9.3% Tuareg; 8.5% Fulani; 4.7% Kanuri; 0.4% Gurma; 0.4% Toubou; 0.4% Arab; 0.1% others
- Religion (2012): 99.3% Islam; 0.3% Christianity; 0.2% Animism; 0.1% irreligion
- Demonym: Nigerien
- Government: Unitary semi-presidential republic under a military junta
  - President and President of the National Council for the Safeguard of the Homeland: Abdourahamane Tiani
  - Vice President of the National Council for the Safeguard of the Homeland: Salifou Modi
  - Prime Minister: Ali Lamine Zeine
- Legislature: National Council for the Safeguard of the Homeland

Independence from France
  - Republic proclaimed: 18 December 1958
  - Declared: 3 August 1960
  - 2023 coup d'état: 26 July 2023
  - 2025 transitional charter: 26 March 2025

Area
  - Total: 1,267,000 km^{2} (489,000 sq mi) (21st)
  - Water (%): 0.02

Population
  - 2026 estimate: ▲28,814,878 (55th)
  - Density: 23/km^{2} (59.6/sq mi) (204th)
- GDP (PPP): 2025 estimate
  - Total: ▲$61.040 billion (128th)
  - Per capita: ▲$2,100 (176th)
- GDP (nominal): 2025 estimate
  - Total: ▲$21.870 billion (123rd)
  - Per capita: ▲$751 (181st)
- Gini (2021): ▼32.9 medium inequality
- HDI (2023): ▲0.419 low (188th)
- Currency: West African CFA franc (XOF)
- Time zone: UTC+1 (WAT)
- Calling code: +227
- ISO 3166 code: NE
- Internet TLD: .ne

Niger, (Note: /niːˈʒɛər, ˈnaɪdʒər/ nee-ZHAIR, NY-jər, Hausa: Nijar [nìːd͡ʒâr]) officially the Republic of the Niger, (Note: Hausa: Jamhuriyar Nijar, pronounced [d͡ʒamhuːɽijaɽ nìːd͡ʒâr]) is a landlocked country in West Africa. It is a unitary state bordered by Libya to the northeast, Chad to the east, Nigeria to the south, Benin and Burkina Faso to the southwest, Mali to the west and Algeria to the northwest. It covers a land area of almost 1.27 million km^{2} (490,000 mi^{2}), making it the sixth-largest country in Africa and the second-largest landlocked nation in Africa behind Chad. Over 80% of its land area lies in the Sahara. Its predominantly Muslim population of about 29 million lives mostly in clusters in the south and west of the country. The capital Niamey is located in the southwest corner along the namesake Niger River.

Following the spread of Islam to the region, Niger was on the fringes of some states, including the Kanem–Bornu Empire and the Mali Empire before more significant parts of its territory became included in states such as the Sultanate of Agadez and the Songhai Empire. It was colonized by France during the Scramble for Africa as part of French West Africa, becoming a distinct colony in 1922. Since obtaining independence in 1960, Niger has experienced five coups d'état and four periods of military rule. Niger's seventh and most recent constitution was enacted in 2010, establishing a multiparty, unitary semi-presidential system. Following the most recent coup in 2023, the country has been ruled by National Council for the Safeguard of the Homeland, a military junta, led by President Abdourahamane Tiani.

The Hausa are the largest ethnic group, making up around 56% of the population. Hausa is the official and national language. According to the UN's Multidimensional Poverty Index report of 2023, Niger is one of the poorest countries in the world. Some non-desert portions of the country undergo periodic drought and desertification. Its economy is concentrated around subsistence agriculture, with some export agriculture in the less arid south, and the export of raw materials, including uranium ore. It faces challenges to development due to its landlocked position, desert terrain, low literacy rate, an Islamist insurgency, and high fertility rates due to birth control not being used and the resulting rapid population growth.

== Etymology ==
The name comes from the Niger River which flows through the west of the country. The origin of the river's name is uncertain. Alexandrian geographer Ptolemy wrote descriptions of the wadi Gir (in neighbouring modern Algeria) and the Ni-Gir 'Lower Gir' to the south, possibly referring to the Niger River. The modern spelling Niger was first recorded by Berber scholar Leo Africanus in 1550, possibly derived from the Tuareg phrase the (e)gărăw-n-gărăwăn meaning literally 'river of rivers'. There is broad consensus among linguists that it does not derive from the Latin niger 'black' as was first erroneously believed. The standard pronunciation in English is /niːˈʒɛər/, while in some Anglophone media /ˈnaɪdʒər/ is also used.

== History ==
=== Prehistory ===
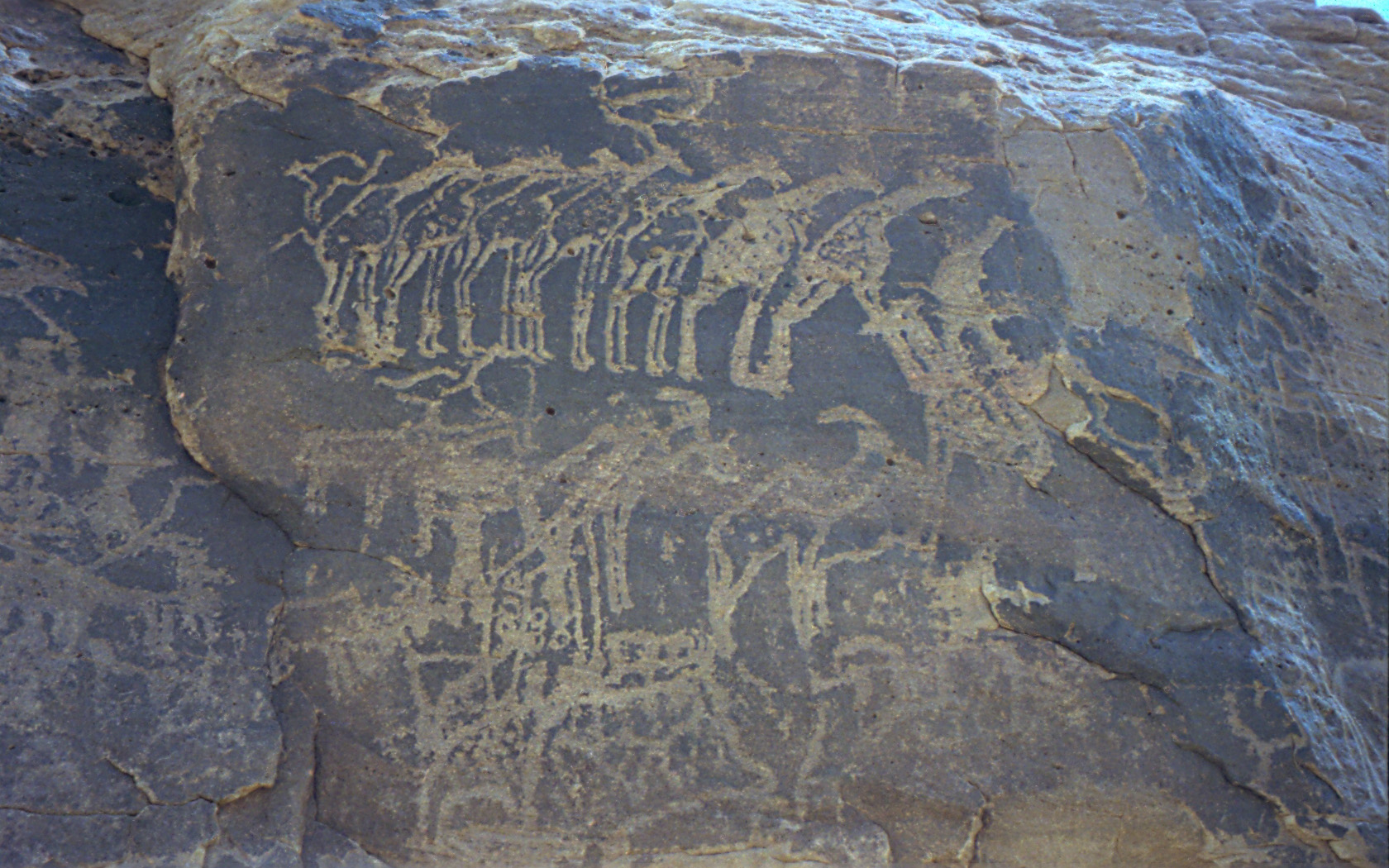
Rock engraving showing herds of giraffe, ibex, and other animals in the southern Sahara near Tiguidit, Niger

Stone tools, some dating as far back as 280,000 years before present (BP), have been found in Adrar Bous, Bilma and Djado in the northern Agadez Region. Some of these finds have been linked with the Aterian and Mousterian tool cultures of the Middle Paleolithic period, which flourished in northern Africa circa 90,000 BP. It is thought that these humans lived a hunter-gatherer lifestyle. During the prehistoric African humid period, the climate of the Sahara was wetter and more fertile, a phenomenon archaeologists refer to as the "Green Sahara" which provided "favourable" conditions for hunting and later agriculture and livestock herding.

The Neolithic era, beginning circa 10,000 BP, saw a number of changes such as the introduction of pottery (as evidenced at Tagalagal, Temet and Tin Ouffadene), the spread of cattle husbandry, and the burying of the dead in stone tumuli. As the climate changed in the period 4000–2800 BC the Sahara gradually began drying out, forcing a change in settlement patterns to the south and east. Agriculture spread, including the planting of millet and sorghum, and pottery production. Iron and copper items appear in this era, with finds including those at Azawagh, Takedda, Marendet and the Termit Massif. The Kiffian (circa 8000–6000 BC) and Tenerian (circa 5000–2500 BC) cultures, centred on Adrar Bous and Gobero where skeletons have been uncovered, flourished during this period.

Societies continued to grow with regional differentiation in agricultural and funerary practices. A culture of this period is the Bura culture (circa 200–1300 AD) named for the Bura archaeological site where a burial replete with iron and ceramic statuettes were discovered. The Neolithic era saw the flourishing of Saharan rock art, including in the Aïr Mountains, Termit Massif, Djado Plateau, Iwelene, Arakao, Tamakon, Tzerzait, Iferouane, Mammanet and Dabous; the art spans the period from 10,000 BC to 100 AD and depicts a range of subjects, from the varied fauna of the landscape to depictions of spear-carrying figures dubbed 'Libyan warriors'.

Archaeological evidence has indicated that the megalithic monuments in the Saharan region of Niger and the eastern Sahara which developed, as early as 4700 BCE, may have served as antecedents for the mastabas and pyramids of ancient Egypt.

=== Empires and kingdoms in pre-colonial Niger ===
By at least the 5th century BC the territory had become an area of trans-Saharan trade. Led by Tuareg tribes from the north, camels were used as a means of transportation through what became desert. This mobility, which would continue in waves for centuries, was accompanied with migration to the south and intermixing between sub-Saharan African and North African populations, and the spread of Islam. It was aided by the Muslim conquest of the Maghreb in the 7th century, the result of three Arab invasions, which resulted in population movements to the south. Empires and kingdoms existed in the Sahel during this era.

==== Mali Empire (13th to 17th century) ====
The Mali Empire was a Mandinka empire founded by Sundiata Keita in c. 1230 and existed until the 17th century. As detailed in the Epic of Sundiata, Mali emerged as a breakaway region of the Sosso Empire which had split from the earlier Ghana Empire. Thereafter Mali defeated the Sosso at the Battle of Kirina in 1235 and then Ghana in 1240. From its heartland around the later Guinea-Mali border region, the empire expanded under successive kings and came to dominate the trans-Saharan trade routes, reaching its greatest extent during the rule of Mansa Musa in the 14th century. Parts of the Tillabéri Region fell under Malian rule.

A Muslim, Mansa Musa performed the hajj in 1324–25 and encouraged the spread of Islam in the empire, and it "appears that most ordinary citizens continued to maintain their traditional animist beliefs instead of or alongside the new religion". The empire began "declining" in the 15th century due to a combination of internecine strife over the royal succession, weak kings, the shift of European trade routes to the coast, and rebellions in the empire's periphery by Mossi, Wolof, Tuareg and Songhai peoples. A rump Mali kingdom continued to exist until the 17th century.

==== Songhai Empire (11th century–1591) ====
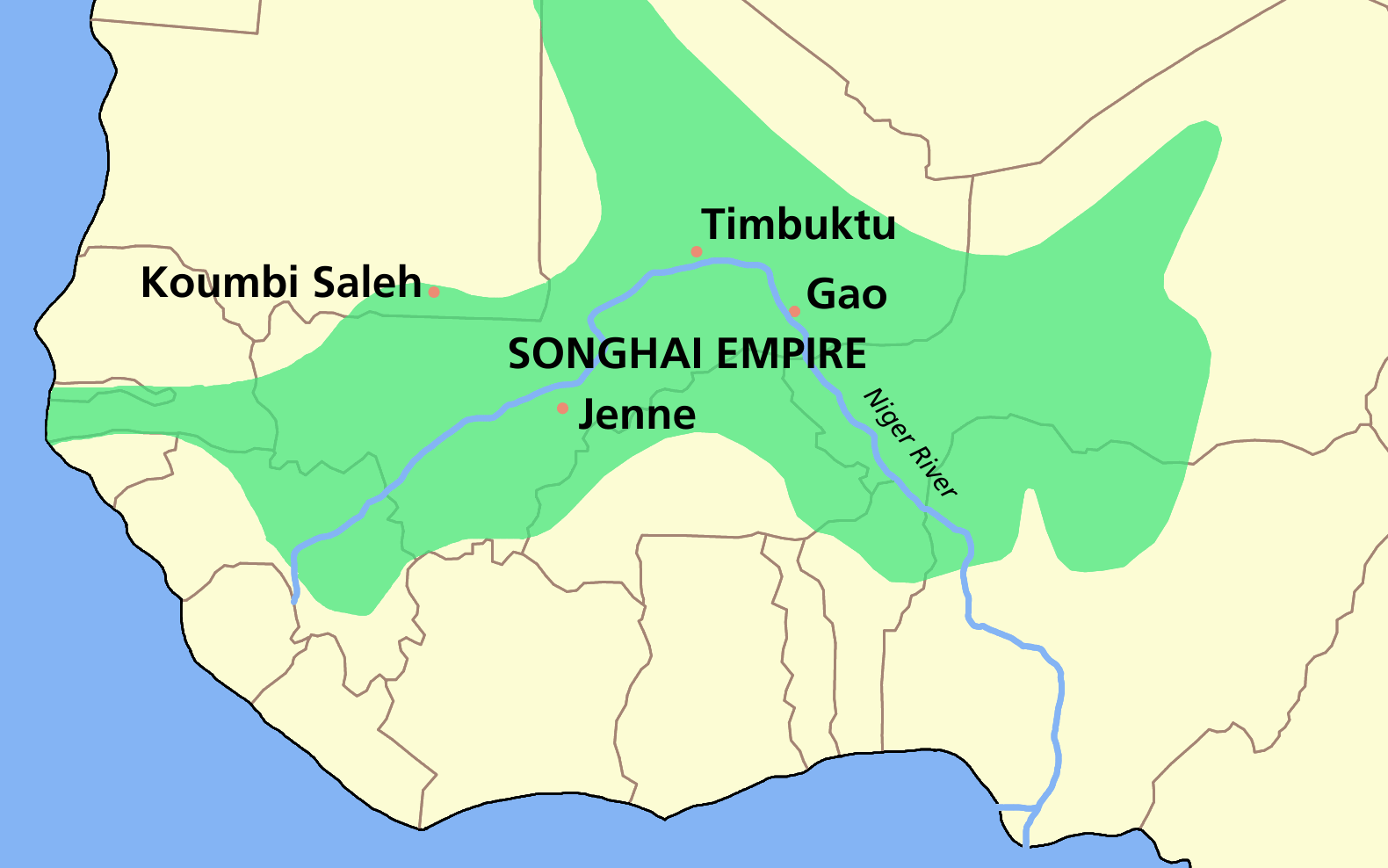
Map of the Songhai Empire, overlaid over modern boundaries

The Songhai Empire was named for its main ethnic group, the Songhai or Sonrai, and was centred on the northernmost bend of the Niger River. Songhai began settling this region from the 7th to 9th centuries; by the 11th century Gao (capital of the former Kingdom of Gao) had become the empire's capital. From 1000 to 1325, the Songhai Empire managed to maintain peace with the Mali Empire, its neighbour to the west. In 1325 Songhai was conquered by Mali until regaining its independence in 1375. Under king Sonni Ali (r. 1464–1492) Songhai adopted an expansionist policy which reached its apogee during the reign of Askia Mohammad I (r. 1493–1528); at this point the empire had expanded from its Niger-bend heartland, including to the east where most of later western Niger fell under its rule, including Agadez which was conquered in 1496. The empire was unable to withstand repeated attacks from the Saadi dynasty and was decisively defeated at the Battle of Tondibi in 1591; it then collapsed into several smaller kingdoms.

==== Sultanate of Aïr (15th century–1906) ====
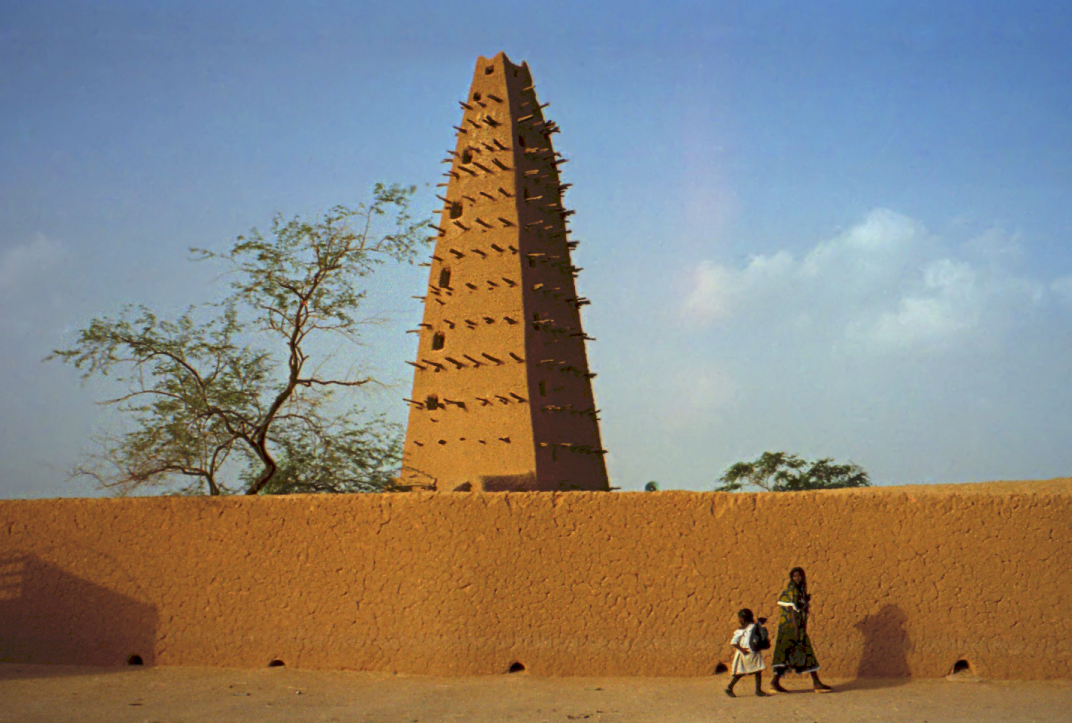
The Grand Mosque of Agadez

In c. 1449 in the north of what is now Niger, the Sultanate of Aïr was founded by Sultan Ilisawan, based in Agadez. Formerly a trading post inhabited by a mixture of Hausa and Tuaregs, it grew as a strategic position on the trans-Saharan trade routes. In 1515, Aïr was conquered by Songhai, remaining a part of that empire until its collapse in 1591. In the following centuries, it "seems that the sultanate entered a decline" marked by internecine wars and clan conflicts. When Europeans began exploring the region in the 19th century, most of Agadez lay in ruins and was taken over by the French.

==== Kanem–Bornu Empire (8th–19th century) ====
To the east, the Kanem–Bornu Empire dominated the region around Lake Chad for a period. It was founded by the Zaghawa around the 8th century and based in Njimi, north-east of the lake. The kingdom gradually expanded, including during the rule of the Sayfawa dynasty which began in c. 1075 under Mai (king) Hummay. The kingdom reached its greatest extent in the 13th century, partly due to the effort of Mai Dunama Dibbalemi, and grew "richer" from its control of some trans-Saharan trade routes; most of eastern and south-eastern Niger, including Bilma and Kaouar, was under Kanem's control in this period. Islam had been introduced to the kingdom by Arab traders from the 11th century, gaining more converts over the following centuries. Attacks by the Bulala people in the 14th century forced Kanem to shift westwards of Lake Chad where it became known as the Bornu Empire ruled from its capital Ngazargamu. Bornu prospered during the rule of Mai Idris Alooma (r. circa 1575–1610) and re-conquered most of the "traditional lands" of Kanem, hence the designation 'Kanem–Bornu' for the empire. By the 18th century the Bornu kingdom had entered a period of decline, shrinking back to its Lake Chad heartland.

Circa 1730–40 a group of Kanuri settlers led by Mallam Yunus left Kanem and founded the Sultanate of Damagaram, centred on the town of Zinder. The sultanate remained nominally subject to the Borno Empire until the reign of Sultan Tanimoune Dan Souleymane in the 19th century, who declared independence and initiated a phase of expansion. The sultanate managed to resist the advance of the Sokoto Caliphate (see below), and was later captured by the French in 1899.

==== Hausa states and other smaller kingdoms (15th–19th century) ====
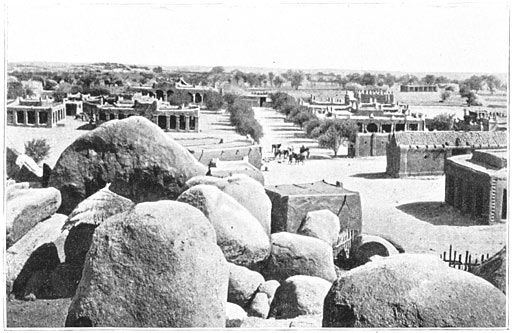
Overlooking the town of Zinder and the Sultan's Palace from the French fort (1906). The arrival of the French spelled an end for precolonial states like the Sultanate of Damagaram which carried on only as ceremonial "chiefs" appointed by the colonial government.

Between the Niger River and Lake Chad lay Hausa Kingdoms, encompassing the cultural-linguistic area known as Hausaland which straddles what later became the Niger-Nigeria border. The Hausa are thought to be a mixture of autochthonous peoples and migrant peoples from the north and east, emerging as a distinct people sometime in the 10th to 15th century when the kingdoms were founded. They gradually adopted Islam from the 14th century, and sometimes this existed alongside other religions, developing into syncretic forms; some Hausa groups such as the Azna resisted Islam altogether (the area of Dogondoutchi remains an animist stronghold).

The Hausa kingdoms were not a compact entity but several federations of kingdoms more or less independent of one other. Their organisation was hierarchical and somewhat democratic: the Hausa kings were elected by the notables of the country and could be removed by them. The Hausa Kingdoms began as seven states founded, according to the Bayajidda legend, by the six sons of Bawo. Bawo was the only son of the Hausa queen Daurama and Bayajidda or (Abu Yazid according to certain historians) who came from Baghdad. The seven original Hausa states (also referred to as the 'Hausa bakwai') were: Daura (state of queen Daurama), Kano, Rano, Zaria, Gobir, Katsina and Biram. An extension of the legend states that Bawo had a further seven sons with a concubine, who went on to found the so-called 'Banza (illegitimate) Bakwai': Zamfara, Kebbi, Nupe, Gwari, Yauri, Ilorin and Kwararafa. A smaller state not fitting into this scheme was Konni, centred on Birni-N'Konni.

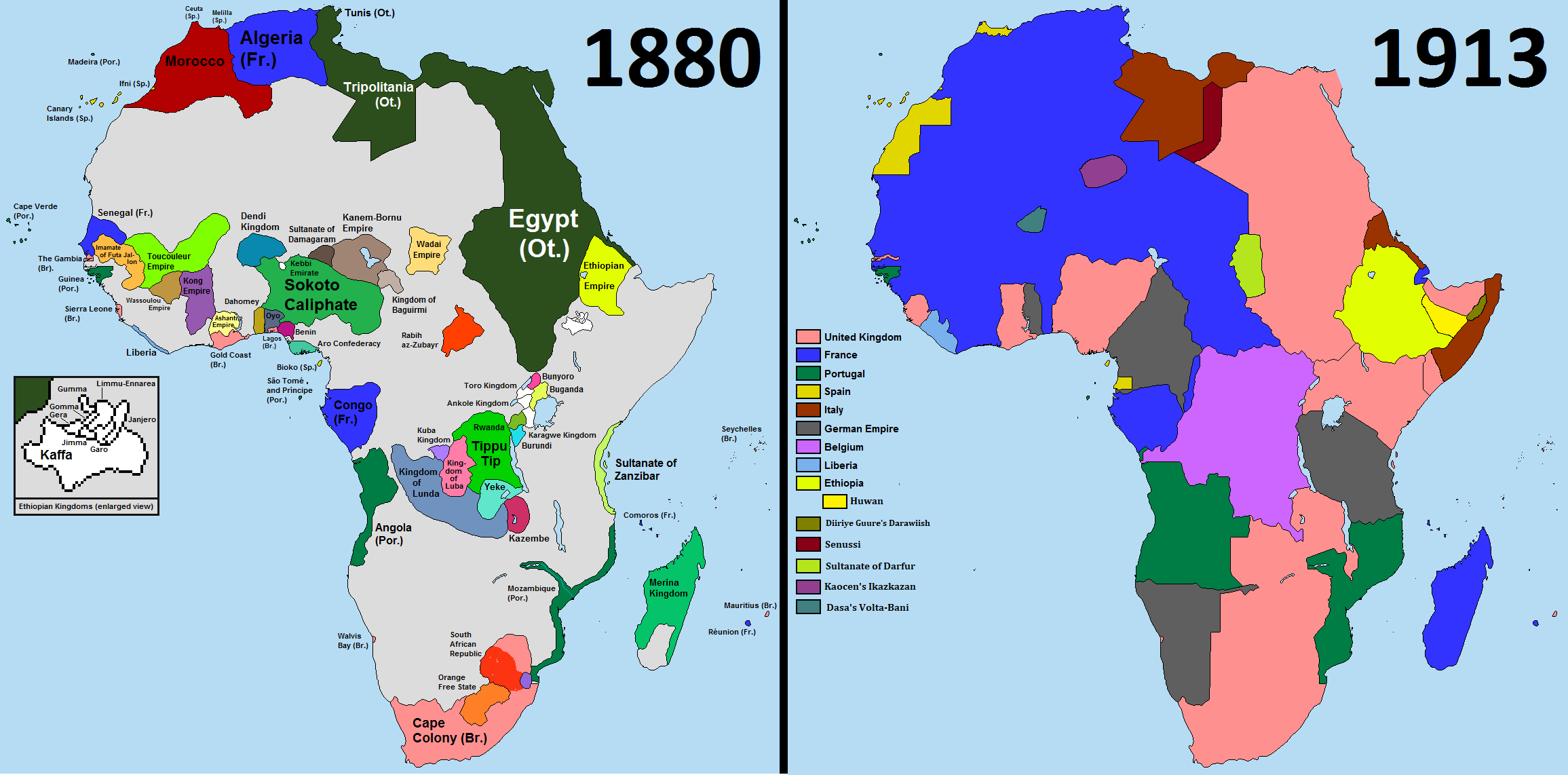
Comparison of Africa in the years 1880 and 1913

The Fulani, a pastoral people found throughout the Sahel, began migrating to Hausaland during the 13th century. During the 18th century some Fulani were unhappy with the syncretic form of Islam practised there; exploiting also the populace's disdain with corruption amongst the Hausa elite, the Fulani scholar Usman Dan Fodio (from Gobir) declared a jihad in 1804. After conquering most of Hausaland (though not the Bornu Kingdom, which remained independent), he proclaimed the Sokoto Caliphate in 1809. Some of the Hausa states survived by fleeing elsewhere, such as the Katsina who moved to Maradi in the south of what later became Niger. Some of these surviving states harassed the Caliphate and a period of wars and skirmishes commenced, with some states (such as Katsina and Gobir) maintaining independence whereas elsewhere newer ones were formed (such as the Sultanate of Tessaoua). The Caliphate managed to survive until, "fatally weakened" by the invasions of Chad-based warlord Rabih az-Zubayr, it finally fell to the British in 1903, with its lands later being partitioned between Britain and France.

Other smaller kingdoms of the period include the Dosso Kingdom and Dendi Kingdom.

=== Colonial rule (1900–1958) ===
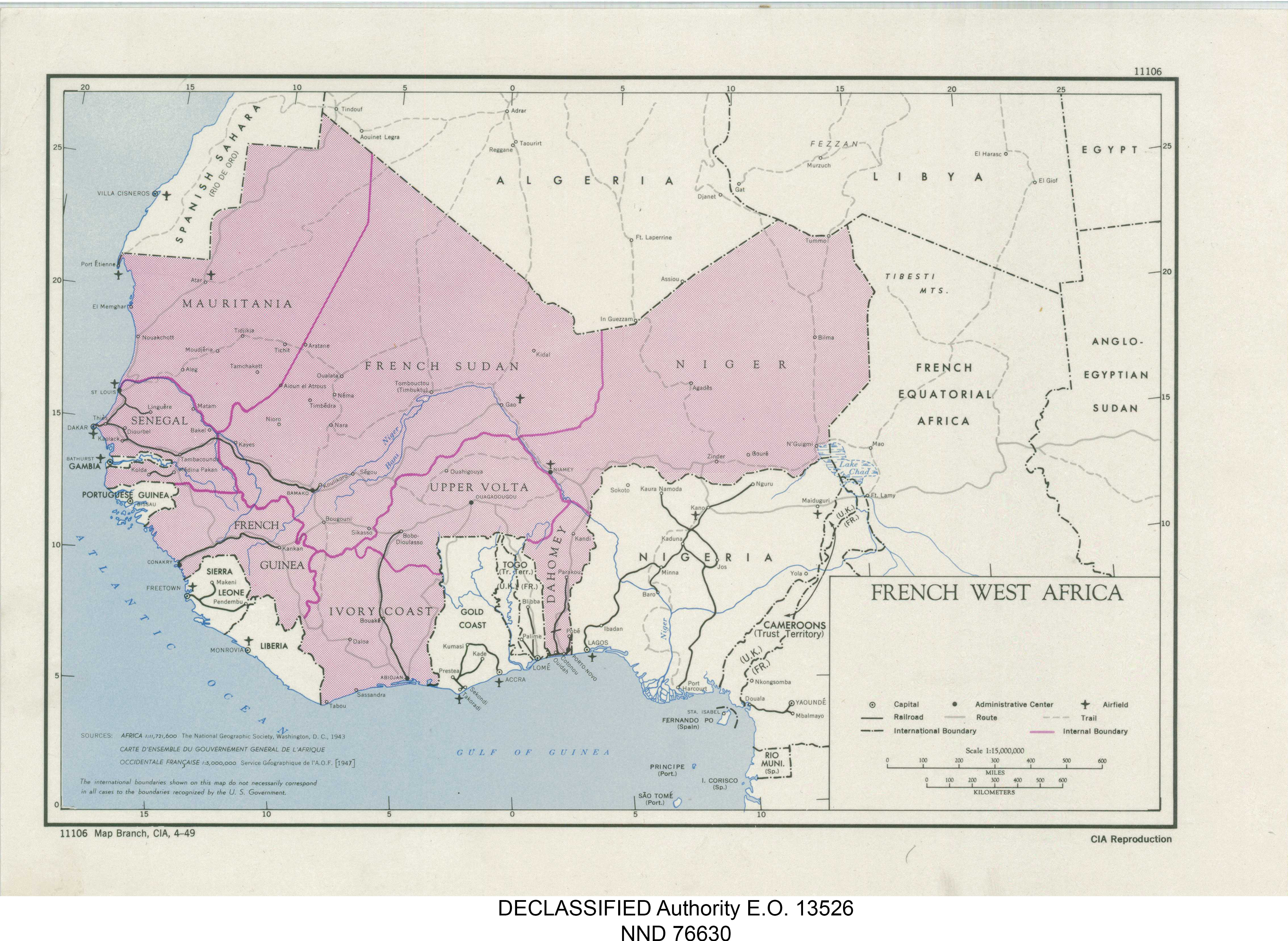
French West Africa in 1949

19th century European explorers to the region were Mungo Park (in 1805–1806), the Oudney-Denham-Clapperton expedition (1822–25), Heinrich Barth (1850–55 with James Richardson and Adolf Overweg), Friedrich Gerhard Rohlfs (1865–1867), Gustav Nachtigal (1869–1874) and Parfait-Louis Monteil (1890–1892).

Some European countries already possessed coastal colonies in Africa, and in the latter half of the century they began to turn their eyes towards the interior of the continent. This process, known as the 'Scramble for Africa', culminated in the 1885 Berlin conference in which the colonial powers outlined the division of Africa into spheres of influence. As a result of this, France gained control of the upper valley of the Niger River (roughly equivalent to the present territory of Mali and Niger). France then set about making a reality of their rule on the ground. In 1897 French officer Marius Gabriel Cazemajou was sent to Niger. He reached the Sultanate of Damagaram in 1898 and stayed in Zinder at the court of Sultan Amadou Kouran Daga. He was later killed, as Daga feared he would ally with the Chad-based warlord Rabih az-Zubayr.

In 1899–1900, France coordinated three expeditions—the Gentil Mission from French Congo, the Foureau-Lamy Mission from Algeria and the Voulet–Chanoine Mission from Timbuktu—with the aim of linking France's African possessions. The three eventually met at Kousséri (in the far north of Cameroon) and defeated Rabih az-Zubayr's forces at the Battle of Kousséri. The Voulet-Chanoine Mission was "marred by atrocities", and "became notorious" for pillaging, looting, and raping and killing local civilians on its passage throughout southern Niger. On 8 May 1899, in retaliation for the resistance of Queen Sarraounia, Voulet and his men killed all the inhabitants of Birni-N'Konni in what is regarded as "one of the worst massacres in French colonial history". The brutal methods of Voulet and Chanoine caused a scandal, and Paris was forced to intervene; when Lieutenant-Colonel Jean-François Klobb caught up with the mission near Tessaoua to relieve them of command, he was killed. Lieutenant Paul Joalland, Klobb's former officer, and Lieutenant Octave Meynier eventually took over the mission following a mutiny in which Voulet and Chanoine were killed.

The Military Territory of Niger was subsequently created within the Upper Senegal and Niger colony in 1904 with its capital at Niamey. The border with Britain's colony of Nigeria to the south was finalised in 1910, a rough delimitation having already been agreed by the two powers via treaties during the period 1898–1906. The capital of the territory was moved to Zinder in 1912 when the Niger Military Territory was split off from Upper Senegal and Niger, before being moved back to Niamey in 1922 when Niger became a colony within French West Africa. The borders of Niger were drawn up in stages and had been fixed by the 1930s. Territorial adjustments took place in this period: the areas west of the Niger river were attached to Niger in 1926–1927, and during the dissolution of Upper Volta (modern Burkina Faso) in 1932–1947 most of the east of that territory was added to Niger; and in the east the Tibesti Mountains were transferred to Chad in 1931.

The French generally adopted a form of indirect rule, allowing existing native structures to continue to exist within the colonial framework of governance providing that they acknowledged French supremacy. The Zarma of the Dosso Kingdom in particular proved amenable to French rule, using them as allies against the encroachments of Hausa and other nearby states; over time the Zarma thus became one of the more educated and westernised groups in Niger. Perceived threats to French rule, such as the Kobkitanda rebellion in Dosso Region (1905–1906), led by the blind cleric Alfa Saibou, and the Karma revolt in the Niger valley (December 1905 – March 1906) led by Oumarou Karma were suppressed with force, as were the latter Hamallayya and Hauka religious movements. While largely successful in subduing the sedentary populations of the south, the French faced more difficulty with the Tuareg in the north (centered on the Sultanate of Aïr in Agadez), and France was unable to occupy Agadez until 1906. Tuareg resistance continued, culminating in the Kaocen revolt of 1916–1917, led by Ag Mohammed Wau Teguidda Kaocen, with backing from the Senussi in Fezzan; the revolt was violently suppressed and Kaocen fled to Fezzan where he was later killed. A puppet sultan was set up by the French and the decline and marginalisation of the north continued, exacerbated by a series of droughts. Limited economic development took place in Niger during the colonial years, such as the introduction of groundnut cultivation. Measures to improve food security following a series of devastating famines in 1913, 1920, and 1931 were introduced.

During the Second World War, during which time mainland France was occupied by Nazi Germany, Charles de Gaulle issued the Brazzaville Declaration, declaring that the French colonial empire would be replaced post-war with a less centralised French Union. The French Union, which lasted from 1946 to 1958, conferred a limited form of French citizenship on the inhabitants of the colonies, with some decentralisation of power and limited participation in political life for local advisory assemblies. It was during this period that the Nigerien Progressive Party (Parti Progressiste Nigérien, originally a branch of the African Democratic Rally, or Rassemblement Démocratique Africain) was formed under the leadership of former teacher Hamani Diori, as was the left-wing Mouvement Socialiste Africain-Sawaba (MSA), led by Djibo Bakary. Following the Overseas Reform Act (Loi Cadre) of 23 July 1956 and the establishment of the Fifth French Republic on 4 December 1958, Niger became an autonomous state within the French Community. On 18 December 1958, an autonomous Republic of Niger was officially created under the leadership of Hamani Diori. MSA was banned in 1959 for its perceived excessive anti-French stance. Niger left the French Community and acquired full independence on 3 August 1960; Diori thus became the first president of the country.

=== Post-colonial ===
==== Diori years (1960–1974) ====
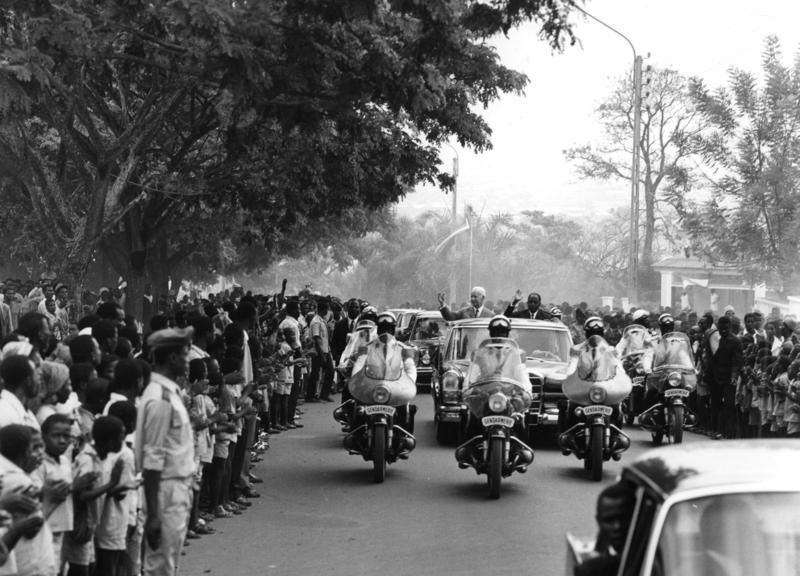
President Hamani Diori and visiting German president Heinrich Lübke greet crowds on a state visit to Niamey, 1969. Diori's single party rule was characterised by "good" relations with the West and a preoccupation with foreign affairs.

For its first 14 years as an independent state, Niger was run by a single-party civilian regime under the presidency of Hamani Diori. The 1960s saw an expansion of the education system and some limited economic development and industrialisation. Links with France remained, with Diori allowing the development of French-led uranium mining in Arlit and supporting France in the Algerian War. Relations with other African states were mostly "positive", with the exception of Dahomey (Benin), owing to a border dispute. Niger remained a one-party state throughout this period, with Diori surviving a planned coup in 1963 and an assassination attempt in 1965; most of this activity was masterminded by Djibo Bakary's MSA-Sawaba group which had launched an abortive rebellion in 1964. In the 1970s, a combination of economic difficulties, droughts and accusations of rampant corruption and mismanagement of food supplies resulted in a 1974 coup d'état that overthrew the Diori regime.

==== First military regime (1974–1991) ====
The coup had been masterminded by Colonel Seyni Kountché and a military group under the name of the Conseil Militaire Supreme, with Kountché going on to rule the country until his death in 1987. The first action of the military government was to address the food crisis. Whilst political prisoners of the Diori regime were released after the coup, political and individual freedoms in general deteriorated during this period. There were attempted coups (in 1975, 1976 and 1984) which were thwarted, their instigators being punished.

President Seyni Kountché during the state visit of West German president Karl Carstens to Niger in 1983

Kountché sought to create a "development society", funded mostly by the uranium mines in Agadez Region. Parastatal companies were created, infrastructure (building and new roads, schools, health centres) constructed, and there was corruption in government agencies, which Kountché did not hesitate to punish. In the 1980s, Kountché began cautiously loosening the grip of the military, with some relaxation of state censorship and attempts made to 'civilianise' the regime. The economic boom ended following the collapse in uranium prices, and IMF-led austerity and privatisation measures provoked opposition by some Nigeriens. In 1985, a Tuareg revolt in Tchintabaraden was suppressed. Kountché died in November 1987 from a brain tumour and was succeeded by his chief of staff, Colonel Ali Saibou who was confirmed as Chief of the Supreme Military Council.

Saibou curtailed the most repressive aspects of the Kountché era (such as the secret police and media censorship) and set about introducing a process of political reform under the overall direction of a single party (the Mouvement National pour la Société du Développement, or MNSD). A Second Republic was declared, and a new constitution was drawn up, which was adopted following a referendum in 1989. Saibou became president of the Second Republic after winning the 1989 presidential election.

Saibou's efforts to control political reforms failed in the face of trade union and student demands to institute a multi-party democratic system. On 9 February 1990, a violently repressed student march in Niamey led to the death of three students, which led to increased national and international pressure for further democratic reform. The Saibou regime acquiesced to these demands by the end of 1990. Meanwhile, trouble re-emerged in Agadez Region when a group of armed Tuaregs attacked Tchintabaraden (seen by some as the start of the first Tuareg Rebellion), prompting a military crackdown which led to deaths (the precise numbers are disputed, with estimates ranging from 70 to up to 1,000).

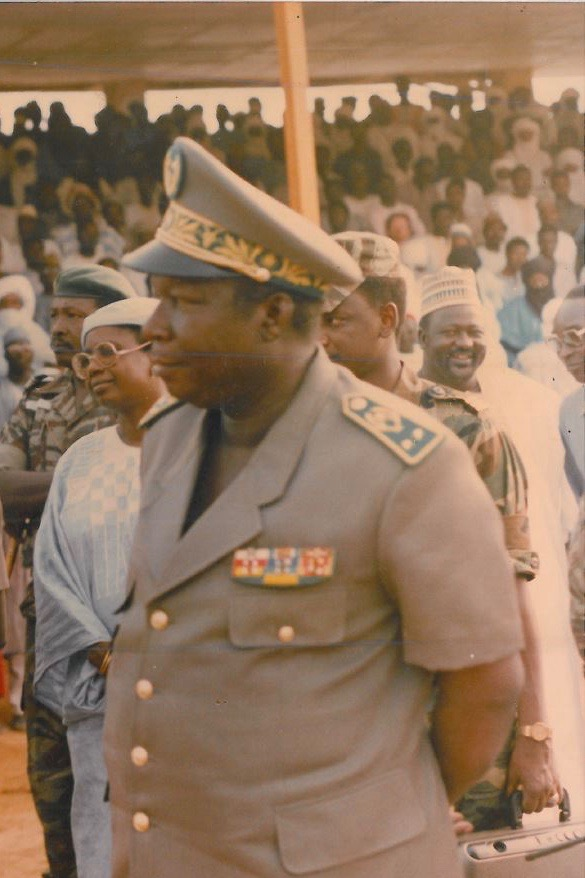
Ali Saibou, President 1987–93, helped oversee the transition from military to civilian rule.

==== National Conference and Third Republic (1991–1996) ====
The National Sovereign Conference of 1991 brought about multi-party democracy. The conference gathered together all elements of society to make recommendations for the future direction of the country. The conference was presided over by André Salifou and developed a plan for a transitional government; this was then installed in November 1991 to manage the affairs of state until the institutions of the Third Republic were put into place in April 1993. After the National Sovereign Conference, the transitional government drafted a constitution that eliminated the previous single-party system of the 1989 constitution and guaranteed more freedoms. The constitution was adopted by a referendum in December 1992. Elections were held in 1993, and Mahamane Ousmane became president of the Third Republic. Ousmane's presidency saw four government changes and legislative elections in 1995, and an economic slump.

The violence in Agadez Region continued during this period, prompting the Nigerien government to sign a truce with Tuareg rebels in 1992 which was ineffective owing to internal dissension within the Tuareg ranks. Another rebellion broke out in the east of the country, led by dissatisfied Toubou peoples claiming that, like the Tuareg, the Nigerien government had neglected their region. In April 1995 a peace deal with a Tuareg rebel group was signed, with the government agreeing to absorb some former rebels into the military and, with French assistance, help others return to a productive civilian life.

==== Second and third military regimes (1996–1999) ====
The governmental paralysis prompted the military to intervene; a coup on 27 January 1996, led by Colonel Ibrahim Baré Maïnassara deposed Ousmane and ended the Third Republic. Maïnassara headed a Conseil de Salut National (National Salvation Council) composed of military officials which carried out a six-month transition period, during which a constitution was drafted and adopted.

Presidential campaigns were organised in the months that followed. Maïnassara entered the campaign as an independent candidate and won the 1996 election. The elections were viewed nationally and internationally by some as irregular, as the electoral commission was replaced during the campaign. Meanwhile, Maïnassara instigated an IMF and World Bank-approved privatisation programme which enriched some of his supporters and were opposed by the trade unions. Following fraudulent local elections in 1999 the opposition ceased any cooperation with the Maïnassara regime. In unknown circumstances (possibly attempting to flee the country), Maïnassara was assassinated at Niamey Airport on 9 April 1999.

Major Daouda Malam Wanké then took over, establishing a transitional National Reconciliation Council to oversee the drafting of a constitution with a French-style semi-presidential system. This was adopted and was followed by presidential and legislative elections in 1999. The elections were generally found to be free and fair by international observers. Wanké then withdrew from governmental affairs.

==== Fifth Republic (1999–2009) ====
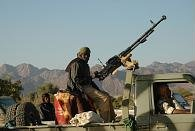
A Tuareg rebel fighter in northern Niger during the Second Tuareg Rebellion, 2008

After winning the election in November 1999, President Mamadou Tandja was sworn into office as president of the Fifth Republic. Mamadou brought about administrative and economic reforms that had been halted due to the military coups since the Third Republic, and helped peacefully resolve a decades-long boundary dispute with Benin. In August 2002, unrest within military camps occurred in Niamey, Diffa, and Nguigmi, and the government was able to restore order within days. Municipal elections were held to elect local representatives previously appointed by the government. These elections were followed by presidential elections, in which Mamadou was re-elected for a second term, thus becoming the first president of the republic to win consecutive elections without being deposed by military coups. The legislative and executive configuration remained somewhat similar to that of the first term of the president: Hama Amadou was reappointed as prime minister and Mahamane Ousmane, the head of the CDS party, was re-elected as the president of the National Assembly (parliament) by his peers.

By 2007, the relationship between Tandja and Ousmane had deteriorated, and Ousmane was replaced by Seyni Oumarou following a successful vote of no confidence at the Assembly. Tandja sought to extend his presidency by modifying the constitution which limited presidential terms. Proponents of the extended presidency, who rallied behind the 'Tazartche' (Hausa for 'overstay') movement, were countered by opponents ('anti-Tazartche') composed of opposition party militants and civil society activists.

The north saw the outbreak of a Second Tuareg Rebellion in 2007 led by the Mouvement des Nigériens pour la justice. With a number of kidnappings the rebellion had ceased by 2009. The poor security situation in the region is thought to have allowed elements of Al-Qaeda in the Islamic Maghreb (AQIM) to gain a foothold in the country.

==== Sixth republic and fourth military regime (2009–2010) ====
Tandja organized a 2009 constitutional referendum seeking to extend his presidency, which was opposed by other political parties and went against the decision of the Constitutional Court which had ruled that the referendum would be unconstitutional. Tandja modified and adopted a new constitution by referendum, which was declared illegal by the Constitutional Court, prompting Tandja to dissolve the court and assume emergency powers. The opposition boycotted the referendum, and the constitution was adopted with 92.5% of voters and a 68% turnout, according to official results. The adoption of the constitution created a Sixth Republic, with a presidential system, the suspension of the 1999 constitution, and a three-year interim government with Tandja as president. The events generated political and social unrest.

In a coup d'état in February 2010, a military junta led by Salou Djibo was established in response to Tandja's attempted extension of his political term. The Supreme Council for the Restoration of Democracy, headed by Djibo, carried out a one-year transition plan, drafted a constitution, and held elections in 2011.

==== Seventh Republic (2010–2023) ====
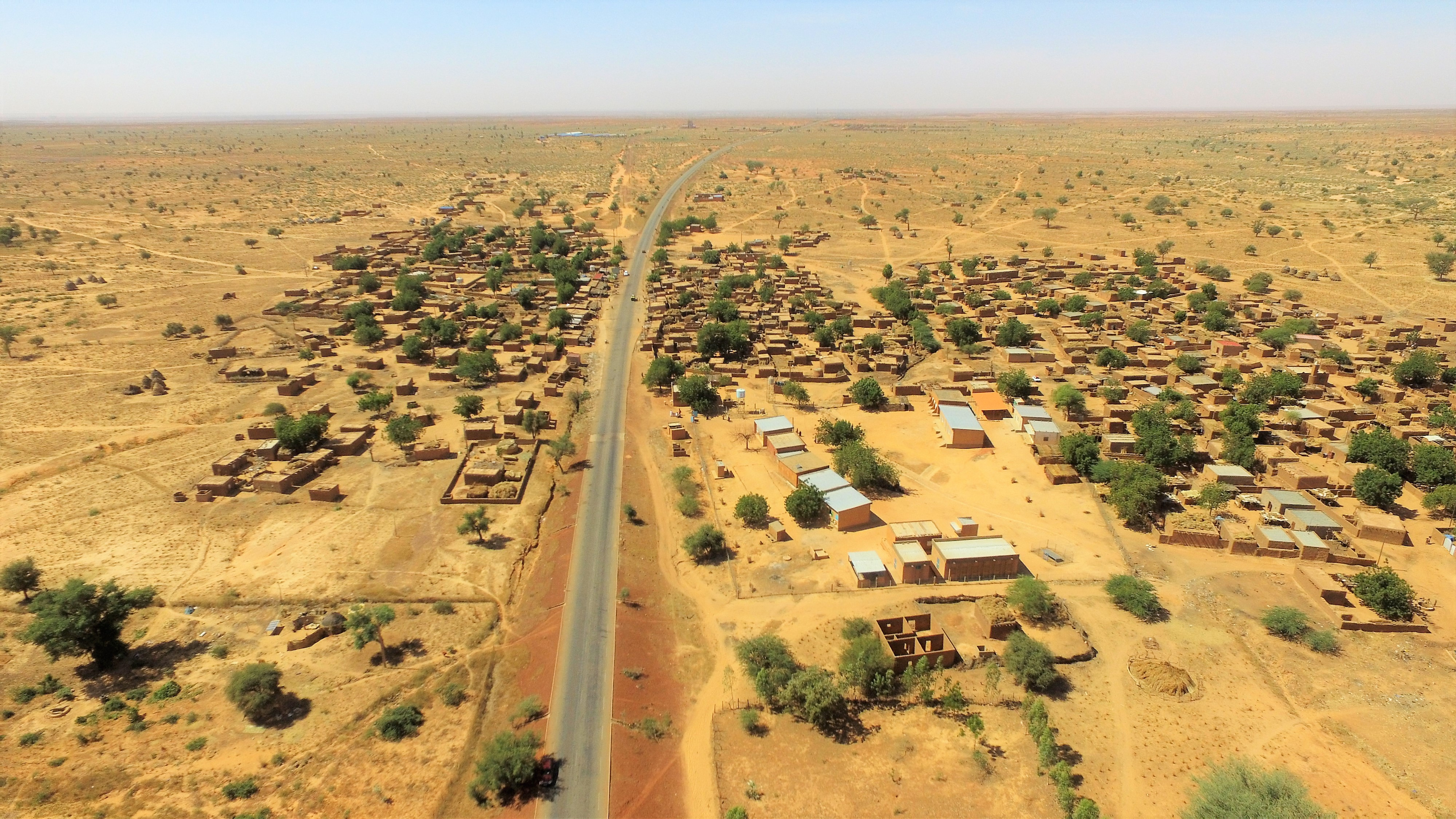
Semi-arid Niger is threatened by further desertification.

Following the adoption of a constitution in 2010 and presidential elections in 2011, Mahamadou Issoufou was elected president of the Seventh Republic; he was re-elected in 2016. The constitution restored the semi-presidential system which had been abolished a year earlier. An attempted coup against him in 2011 was thwarted and its ringleaders arrested. Issoufou's time in office was marked by threats to the country's security, stemming from the fallout from the Libyan Civil War and Northern Mali conflict, an insurgency in western Niger by al-Qaeda and Islamic State, the spillover of Nigeria's Boko Haram insurgency into south-eastern Niger, and the use of Niger as a transit country for migrants (often organised by people-smuggling gangs). French and American forces assisted Niger in countering these threats.

On 10 December 2019, a large group of fighters belonging to the Islamic State in the Greater Sahara (IS-GS) attacked a military post in Inates, killing over seventy Nigerien soldiers and kidnapping others. The attack was the deadliest single incident Niger's military has ever experienced. On 9 January 2020, a large group of IS-GS militants assaulted a Nigerien military base at Chinagodrar, in Niger's Tillabéri Region, killing at least 89 Nigerien soldiers.

In December 2020, Nigeriens went to the polls after Issoufou announced he would step down, paving the way to a peaceful transition of power. No candidate won an absolute majority in the vote: Mohamed Bazoum came closest with 39.33%. Per the constitution, a run-off election was held, with Bazoum taking 55.75% of the vote and opposition candidate (and former president) Mahamane Ousmane taking 44.25%, according to the electoral commission.

At the start of 2021 with the Tchoma Bangou and Zaroumdareye massacres, IS-GS began killing civilians en masse. On 21 March the IS-GS militants attacked several villages around Tillia, killing 141 people, mostly civilians. On 31 March Niger's security forces thwarted an an attempted coup. Gunfire was heard in the presidential palace. The attack took place two days before Bazoum was due to be sworn into office. The Presidential Guard arrested some people during the incident.

==== Fifth military regime (2023–present) ====
The Alliance of Sahel States

On 26 July 2023, a coup by the military overthrew Bazoum, putting an end to the Seventh Republic and the government of Prime Minister Ouhoumoudou Mahamadou. On 28 July, General Abdourahamane Tiani was proclaimed as the de facto head of state of the country. Former finance minister Ali Lamine Zeine was declared Prime Minister of Niger.

The coup was condemned by ECOWAS (the Economic Community of West African States), which in the 2023 Nigerien crisis threatened to use military intervention to reinstate the government of Bazoum if the coup leaders did not by 6 August. The deadline passed without military intervention, though ECOWAS imposed sanctions, including cuts of Nigerian energy exports to Niger which had previously provided 70–90% of Niger's power. In November the coup-led governments of Mali, Burkina Faso, and Niger formed the Alliance of Sahel States in opposition to potential military intervention. In February 2024 several ECOWAS sanctions against Niger were dropped, reportedly for humanitarian and diplomatic reasons, and Nigeria agreed to resume electricity exports to Niger.

In the buildup to the August ECOWAS deadline, the junta requested help from the Russian Wagner Group, though Wagner mercenaries were not known to have entered the country as a result. In October the junta expelled French troops from the country, presenting the move as a step towards sovereignty from the former colonial power, and in December it suspended cooperation with the Francophonie alleging its promotion of French interests. UN resident coordinator Louise Aubin was also expelled in October after the junta alleged "underhanded maneuvers" by UN secretary-general António Guterres to prevent the country's participation in the UN General Assembly. In October the U.S. officially designated the takeover as a coup, suspending most Niger–U.S. military cooperation as well as hundreds of millions of dollars of foreign assistance programs. In April 2024, Russian military trainers and equipment began to arrive in Niger under a new military agreement, and the U.S. agreed to withdraw troops from Niger following the termination of a Niger–U.S. agreement that had allowed U.S. personnel to be stationed in the country.

On 29 August 2026, an unsuccessful coup attempt against President Tiani was carried out by mutinous military officers within the Nigerien Army.

== Geography ==
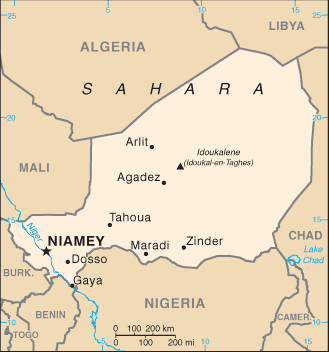
A map of Niger

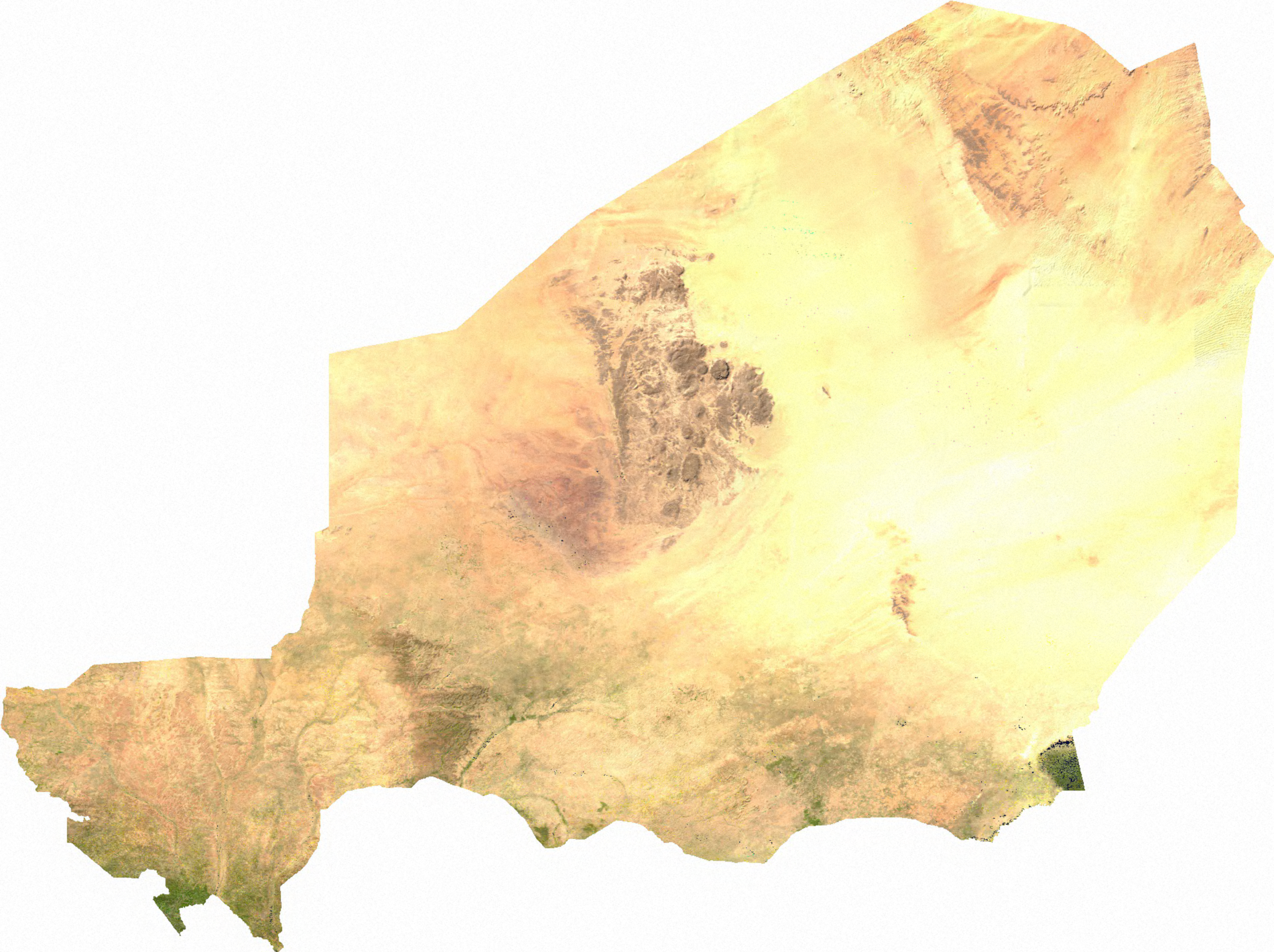
Satellite image of Niger

Niger is a landlocked nation in West Africa along the border between the Sahara and Sub-Saharan regions. It borders Nigeria and Benin to the south, Burkina Faso and Mali to the west, Algeria and Libya to the north and Chad to the east. It lies between latitudes 11° and 24°N, and longitudes 0° and 16°E. Its area is 1.267 million km^{2} (489,191 mi^{2}) of which 300 square kilometres (116 sq mi) is water. Niger borders seven countries and has a perimeter of 5,697 kilometres (3,540 mi). The longest border is with Nigeria (1,497 km or 930 mi).

The lowest point is the Niger River, with an elevation of 200 metres (656 ft). The highest point is Mont Idoukal-n-Taghès in the Aïr Mountains at 2,022 m (6,634 ft). The terrain is predominantly desert plains and sand dunes, with flat to rolling savanna in the south and hills in the north.

=== Climate ===
Map of Köppen climate classification

The hotter and drier climate within desert areas causes more frequent fires in some regions. In the south, there is a tropical climate on the edges of the Niger River basin.

=== Biodiversity ===
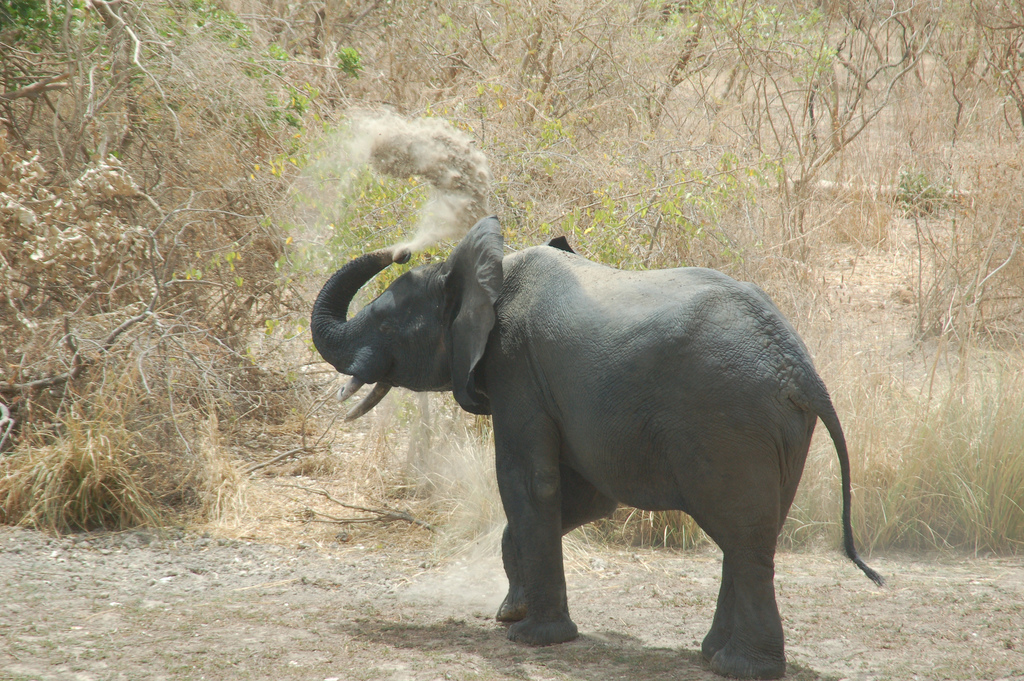
An elephant in the W National Park

There are five terrestrial ecoregions: Sahelian Acacia savanna, West Sudanian savanna, Lake Chad flooded savanna, South Saharan steppe and woodlands, and West Saharan montane xeric woodlands. The north is covered by desert and semi-desert. The typical mammal fauna consists of addax antelopes, scimitar-horned oryx, gazelles, and in the mountains, Barbary sheep. The Aïr and Ténéré National Nature Reserve was founded in the northern parts to protect these species.

Southern Niger is dominated by savanna. The W National Park, situated in the bordering area to Burkina Faso and Benin, belongs to one of the most important areas for wildlife in Western Africa, which is called the WAP (W–Arli–Pendjari) Complex. It has a population of the West African lion and one of the last populations of the Northwest African cheetah. Other wildlife includes elephants, buffaloes, roan antelopes, kob antelopes and warthogs. A relict population of West African giraffe is in the north.

Environmental issues include destructive farming practices as a result of population pressure, illegal hunting, bush fires in some areas and human encroachment upon the flood plains of the Niger River for paddy cultivation. Dams constructed on the Niger River in the neighboring countries of Mali and Guinea and within Niger are cited as a reason for a reduction of water flow in the Niger River—which has a direct effect upon the environment. A lack of adequate staff to guard wildlife in the parks and reserves is another factor cited for loss of wildlife. Farmer-managed natural regeneration is practiced since 1983 to increase food and timber production, and resilience to climate extremes.

== Government and politics ==
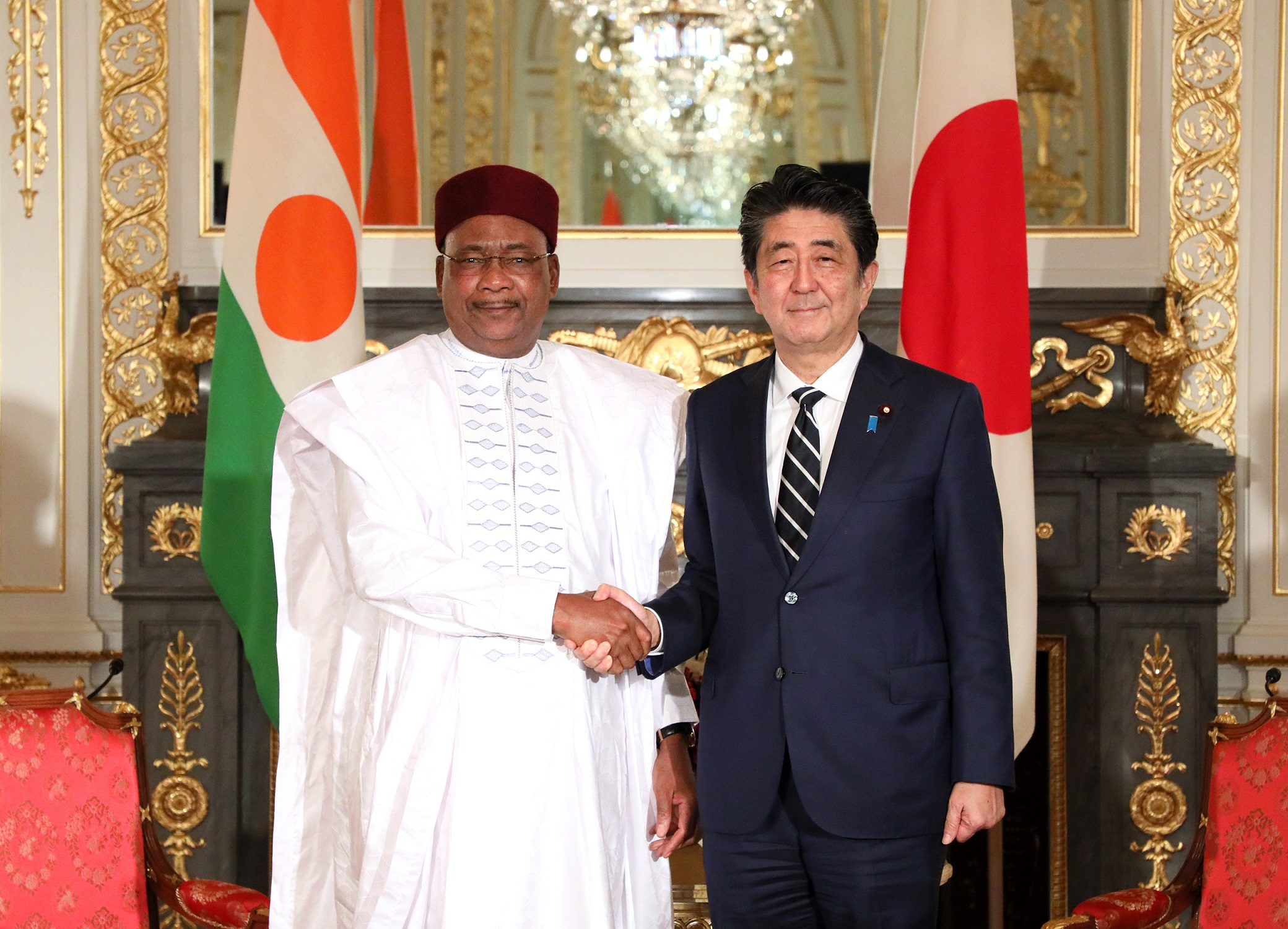
President Mahamadou Issoufou and Japanese Prime Minister Shinzo Abe in October 2019

Niger's most recent constitution was approved by a 2010 referendum. It restored the semi-presidential system of government of the 1999 constitution (Fifth Republic) in which the president, elected by universal suffrage for a five-year term, and a prime minister named by the president share executive power. Since the July 2023 Nigerien coup d'état, the government has been led by Abdourahamane Tiani and the constitution dissolved.

=== Foreign relations ===
Niger historically has pursued a moderate foreign policy and maintained friendly relations with the West. Under the leadership of Tiani, Niger has sought greater relations with Russia, distancing itself from its former colonial power France, withdrawing from the Economic Community of West African States and joining the Alliance of Sahel States as a founding member. It belongs to the UN and its main specialized agencies and, in 1980–1981, served on the UN Security Council.

Niger is a charter member of the African Union and the West African Monetary Union, and belongs to the Niger Basin Authority and Lake Chad Basin Commission, the Non-Aligned Movement, the Organisation of Islamic Cooperation and the Organization for the Harmonization of Business Law in Africa (OHADA). The westernmost regions are joined with contiguous regions of Mali and Burkina Faso under the Liptako–Gourma Authority.

The border dispute with Benin, inherited from colonial times and concerning inter alia Lété Island in the Niger River, was solved by the International Court of Justice in 2005 to Niger's advantage.

=== Military ===
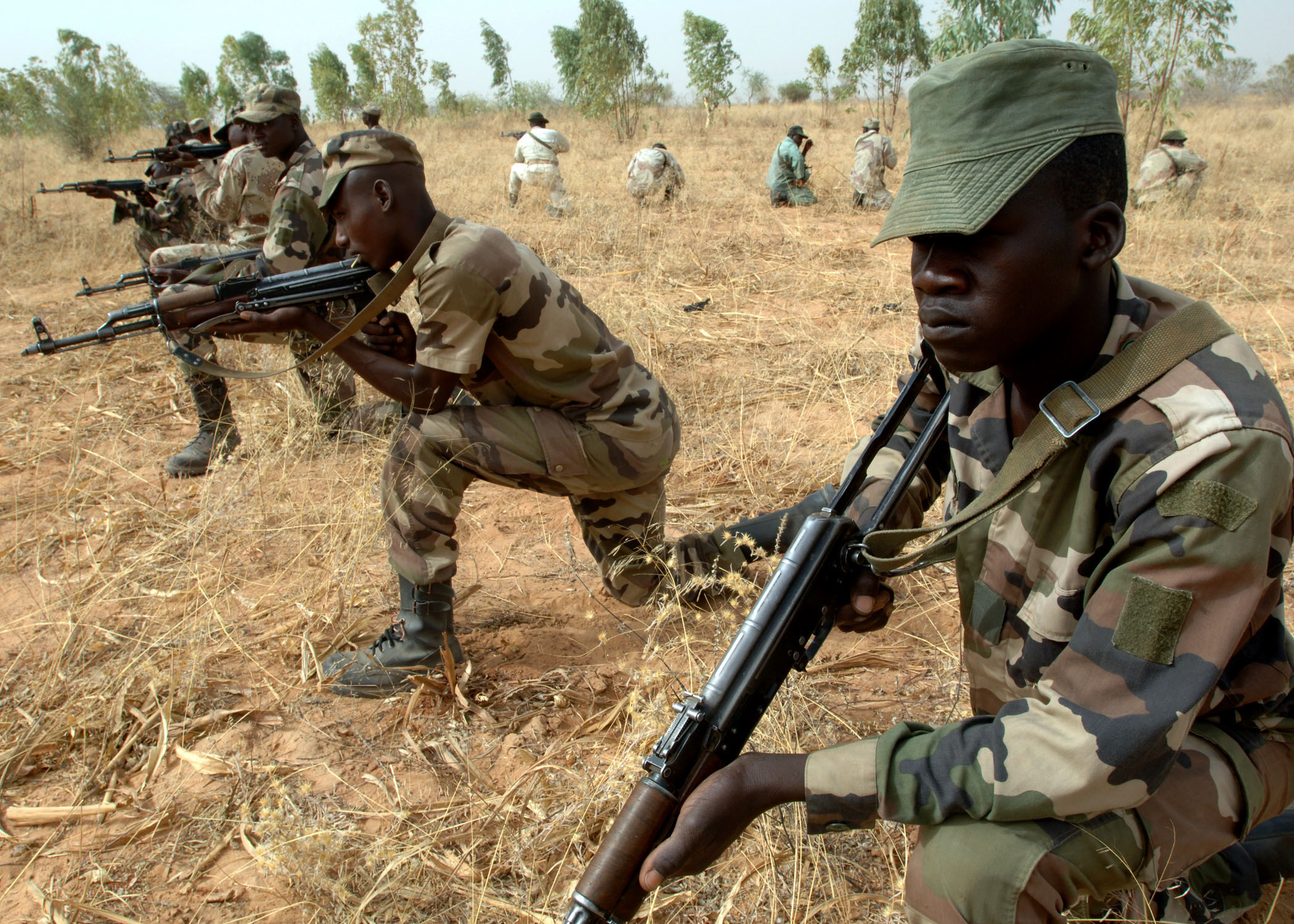
Soldiers from the 322nd Parachute Regiment practice field tactics with the U.S. Army, 2007.

The Niger Armed Forces (Forces armées nigériennes) are the military and paramilitary forces under the president as supreme commander. They consist of the Niger Army (Armée de Terre), the Niger Air Force (Armée de l'Air) and the auxiliary paramilitary forces, such as the National Gendarmerie (Gendarmerie nationale) and the National Guard (Garde nationale). Both paramilitary forces are trained in military fashion and have some military responsibilities in wartime. In peace time their duties are mostly policing.

The armed forces are composed of approximately 12,900 personnel, including 3,700 gendarmes, 3,200 national guards, 300 air force personnel, and 6,000 army personnel. The armed forces have been involved in several military coups over the years with the most recent in 2023. The armed forces have a long history of military cooperation with France and the United States. From 2013, Niamey was home to a U.S. drone base. In 2024, Niger broke its military cooperation agreement with the United States.

=== Judicial system ===
The current Judiciary of Niger was established with the creation of the Fourth Republic in 1999. It is based on the Code Napoleon "Inquisitorial system", established during French colonial rule and the 1960 constitution. The Court of Appeals reviews questions of fact and law, while the Supreme Court reviews application of the law and constitutional questions. The High Court of Justice deals with cases involving senior government officials. The justice system also includes civil criminal courts, customary courts, traditional mediation, and a military court. The military court provides the same rights as civil criminal courts; however, customary courts do not. The military court cannot try civilians.

=== Law enforcement ===
Law enforcement in Niger is the responsibility of the Ministry of Defense through the National Gendarmerie and the Ministry of the Interior through the National Police and the National Guard. The National Police is primarily responsible for law enforcement in urban areas. Outside big cities and in rural areas, this responsibility falls on the National Gendarmerie and the National Guard.

=== Finance ===
Government finance is derived from revenue exports (mining, oil and agricultural exports) as well as various forms of taxes collected by the government. In the past, foreign aid has contributed to large percentages of the budget. In 2013, the government adopted a zero-deficit budget of 1.279 trillion CFA francs ($2.53 billion) which claimed to balance revenues and expenditures by an 11% reduction in the budget from the previous year. The 2014 budget was 1.867 trillion CFA which is distributed as follows according to: public debt (76,703,692,000 CFA), personnel expenditures (210,979,633,960 CFA), operating expenditures (128,988,777,711 CFA); subsidies and transfers (308,379,641,366 CFA) and investment (1,142,513,658,712 CFA).

The importance of external support for Niger's development is demonstrated by the fact that about 45% of the government's FY 2002 budget, including 80% of its capital budget, derives from donor resources. The most important donors in Niger are France, the European Union, the World Bank, the International Monetary Fund, and various United Nations agencies (UNDP, UNICEF, FAO, World Food Programme, and United Nations Population Fund). Other principal donors include the United States, Belgium, Germany, Switzerland, Canada, and Saudi Arabia. While USAID does not have an office in Niger, the United States is a major donor, contributing nearly $10 million each year to Niger's development. The U.S. also is a major partner in policy coordination in such areas as food security and HIV/AIDS.

=== Administrative divisions ===
Administrative divisions of Niger

Niger is divided into 7 regions and one capital district. These regions are subdivided into 36 departments. The 36 departments are broken down into communes of varying types. As of 2006 there were 265 communes, including communes urbaines (urban communes: as subdivisions of major cities), communes rurales (rural communes), in sparsely populated areas and postes administratifs (administrative posts) for largely uninhabited desert areas or military zones.

Rural communes may contain official villages and settlements, while urban communes are divided into quarters. Subvisions were renamed in 2002, in the implementation of a decentralisation project, first begun in 1998.

=== Largest cities and towns ===
Largest cities or towns in Niger According to the 2012 Census
Rank	Name	Region	Pop.
1	Niamey	Niamey	978,029
2	Maradi	Maradi	267,249
3	Zinder	Zinder	235,605
4	Tahoua	Tahoua	117,826
5	Agadez	Agadez	110,497
6	Arlit	Agadez	78,651
7	Birni-N'Konni	Tahoua	63,169
8	Dosso	Dosso	58,671
9	Gaya	Dosso	45,465
10	Tessaoua	Maradi	43,409

== Economy ==
The economy of Niger centers on subsistence crops, livestock, and some of the world's largest uranium deposits. In 2021, Niger was the main supplier of uranium to the EU. Drought cycles, desertification, a 2.9% population growth rate—as well as a drop in world demand for uranium—have undercut the economy. Niger shares a common currency, the CFA franc, and a common central bank, the Central Bank of West African States, with seven other members of the West African Monetary Union.

Two trans-African automobile routes pass through Niger:

- the Algiers-Lagos Highway
- the Dakar-Ndjamena Highway

In December 2000, Niger qualified for enhanced debt relief under the International Monetary Fund program for Heavily Indebted Poor Countries (HIPC) and concluded an agreement with the Fund for Poverty Reduction and Growth Facility. Debt relief provided under the enhanced HIPC initiative significantly reduces Niger's annual debt service obligations, freeing funds for expenditures on basic health care, primary education, HIV/AIDS prevention, rural infrastructure, and other programs geared at poverty reduction.

In 2005, Niger had received 100% multilateral debt relief from the IMF, which translates into the forgiveness of approximately US$86 million in debts to the IMF, excluding the remaining assistance under HIPC. Nearly half of the government's budget is derived from foreign donor resources. Future growth may be sustained by the exploitation of oil, gold, coal, and other mineral resources. A drought and locust infestation in 2005 led to food shortages for as many as 2.5 million Nigeriens.

== Demographics ==
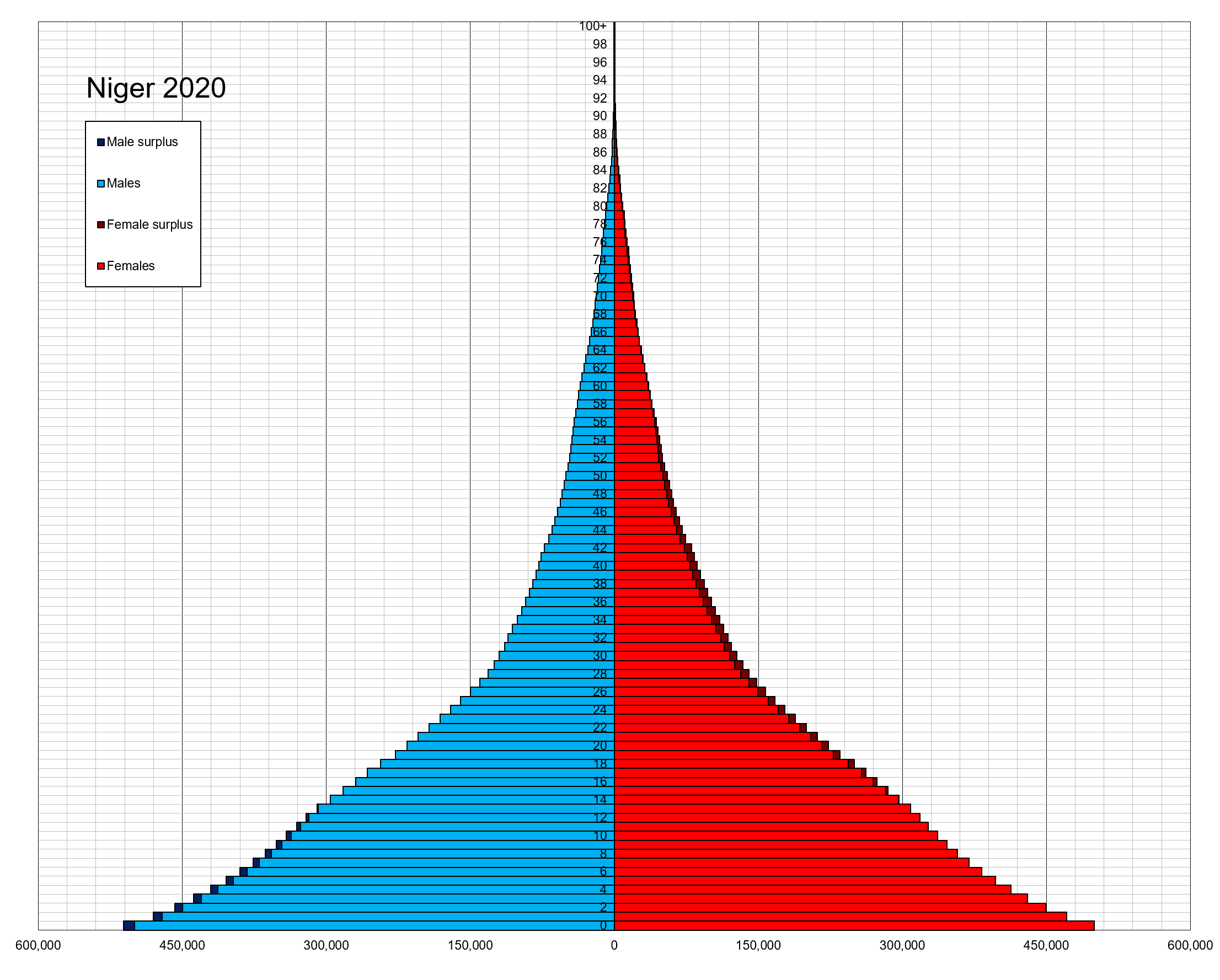
Population age pyramid of Niger in 2020

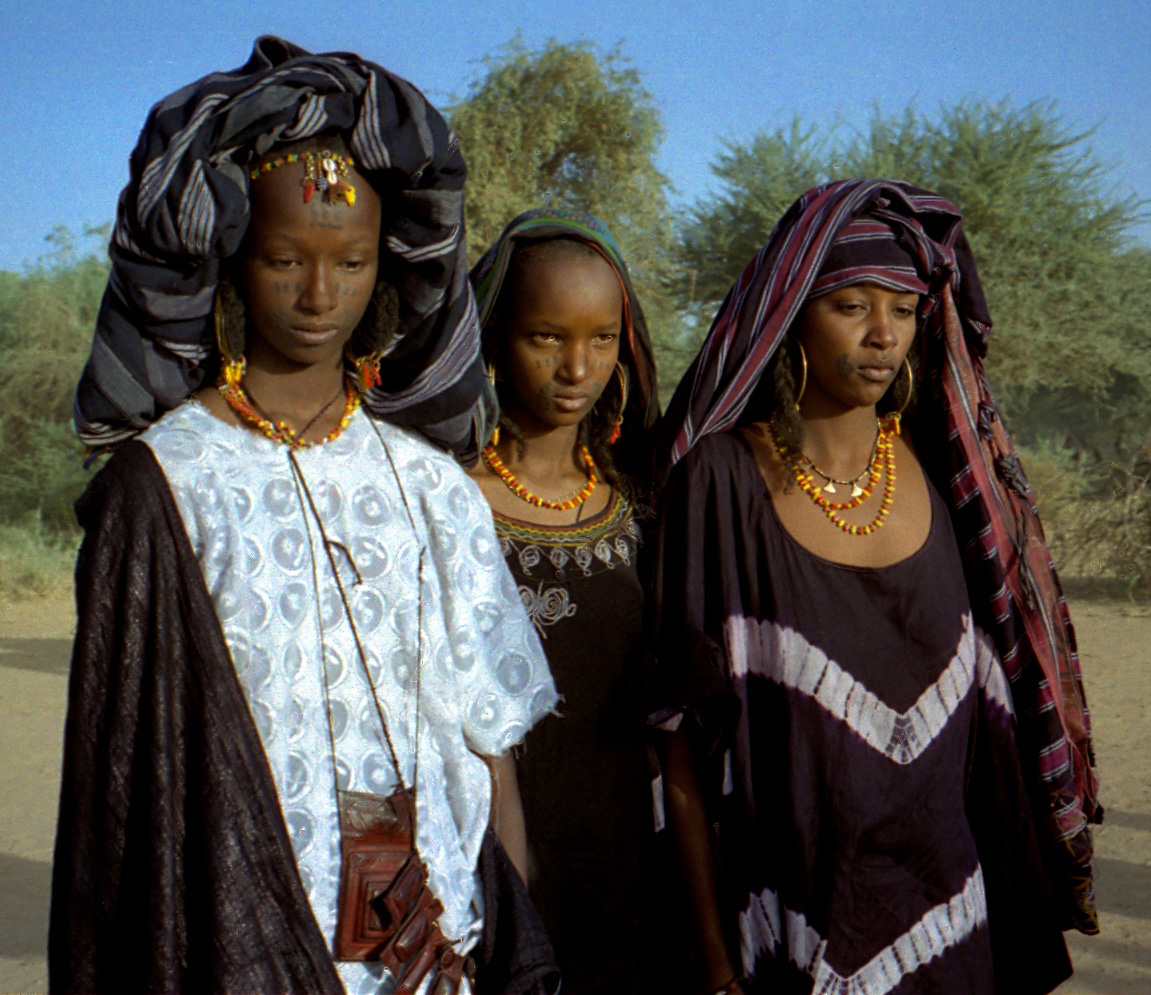
Wodaabe women with traditional facial tattoos

As of 2021, the population was 25,252,722, which has rapidly increased from 3.4 million in 1960 and has a current growth rate of 3.3% (7.1 children per mother). This growth rate is one of the highest in the world and is a source of concern for the government and international agencies. The population is predominantly young, with 49.2% under 15 years old and 2.7% over 65 years, and predominantly rural with only 21% living in urban areas. A 2005 study states that over 800,000 people (nearly 8% of the population) in Niger are enslaved.

=== Urban settlements ===
Cities of Niger
Rank	City	Population		Region
Rank	City	2001 Census	2012 Census	Region
1	Niamey	690,286	978,029	Niamey
2	Maradi	148,017	267,249	Maradi Region
3	Zinder	170,575	235,605	Zinder Region
4	Tahoua	73,002	117,826	Tahoua Region
5	Agadez	77,060	110,497	Agadez Region
6	Arlit	68,835	78,651	Agadez Region
7	Birni N'Konni	44,663	63,169	Tahoua Region
8	Dosso	43,561	58,671	Dosso Region
9	Gaya	28,385	45,465	Dosso Region
10	Tessaoua	31,667	43,409	Maradi Region

=== Ethnic groups ===
Ethnic Groups in Niger (2001 Census)
Ethnic Groups	percent
Hausa	55.4%
Zarma & Songhai	21%
Tuareg	9.3%
Fula	8.5%
Kanuri	4.7%
Toubou	0.4%
Arab	0.4%
Gurma	0.4%
Other	0.1%

As in most West African countries, Niger has a wide variety of ethnic groups. The ethnic makeup of Niger as per the 2001 census was as follows: Hausa (55.4%), Zarma & Songhay (21%), Tuareg (9.3%), Fula (French: Peuls; Fula: Fulɓe) (8.5%), Kanuri Manga (4.7%), Tubu (0.4%), Diffa Arabs (0.4%), Gourmantche (0.4%), other (0.1%). The Zarma and Songhay dominate the Dosso, Tillabéri, and Niamey regions; the Hausa dominate the Zinder, Maradi, and Tahoua regions; Kanuri Manga dominate the Diffa region; and Tuaregs dominate the Agadez region in northern Niger.

=== Languages ===
Hausa is the official language of Niger since the 2025 transitional charter. French, inherited from the colonial period, was the official language until 2025, when Hausa replaced its status as part of President Omar Tiani's decolonization efforts. In 1970, Niger was a founding member of the Agence de Coopération Culturelle et Technique (ACCT) which later went on to become the Organisation Internationale de la Francophonie (OIF); the convention that created the ACCT was signed in Niamey. However, Niger suspended cooperation with the OIF months after the 2023 coup.

In 2001, Niger under President Mamadou Tandja has ten recognized national languages, namely Arabic, Buduma, Fulfulde, Gourmanchéma, Hausa, Kanuri, Zarma and Songhay, Tamasheq, Tassawaq and Tebu. Each is spoken as a first language primarily by the ethnic group with which it is associated. However, the 2025 transitional charter made Hausa the sole national language of the country while other languages were recognized as "being spoken in Niger". French and English are classified as the two working languages in the 2025 charter.

=== Religion ===
Religion in Niger (2001 Census)
religion	percent
Islam	99.3%
Christianity	0.3%
Animism	0.2%
Irreligious	0.1%

Niger is a secular country, and separation of state and religion is guaranteed by Articles 3 and 175 of the 2010 Constitution, which dictate that future amendments or revisions may not modify the secular nature of the republic. Religious freedom is protected by Article 30. Islam, widespread in the region since the 10th century, has greatly shaped the culture and mores of the people of Niger. Islam is the most dominant religion, practiced by 99.3% of the population according to the 2012 census.

The other two main religions of Niger are Christianity, practiced by 0.3% of the population, and animism (traditional indigenous religious beliefs), practiced by 0.2% of the population. Christianity was established by missionaries during the French colonial years. Other urban Christian expatriate communities from Europe and West Africa are also present. Religious persecution has flared in recent years; Christian charity Open Doors lists Niger as the 28th-most difficult country in which to be a Christian on their 2024 World Watch List. Relations between Muslims and Christians have generally been cordial, according to the respective representatives of Christian and Muslim groups in Niger.

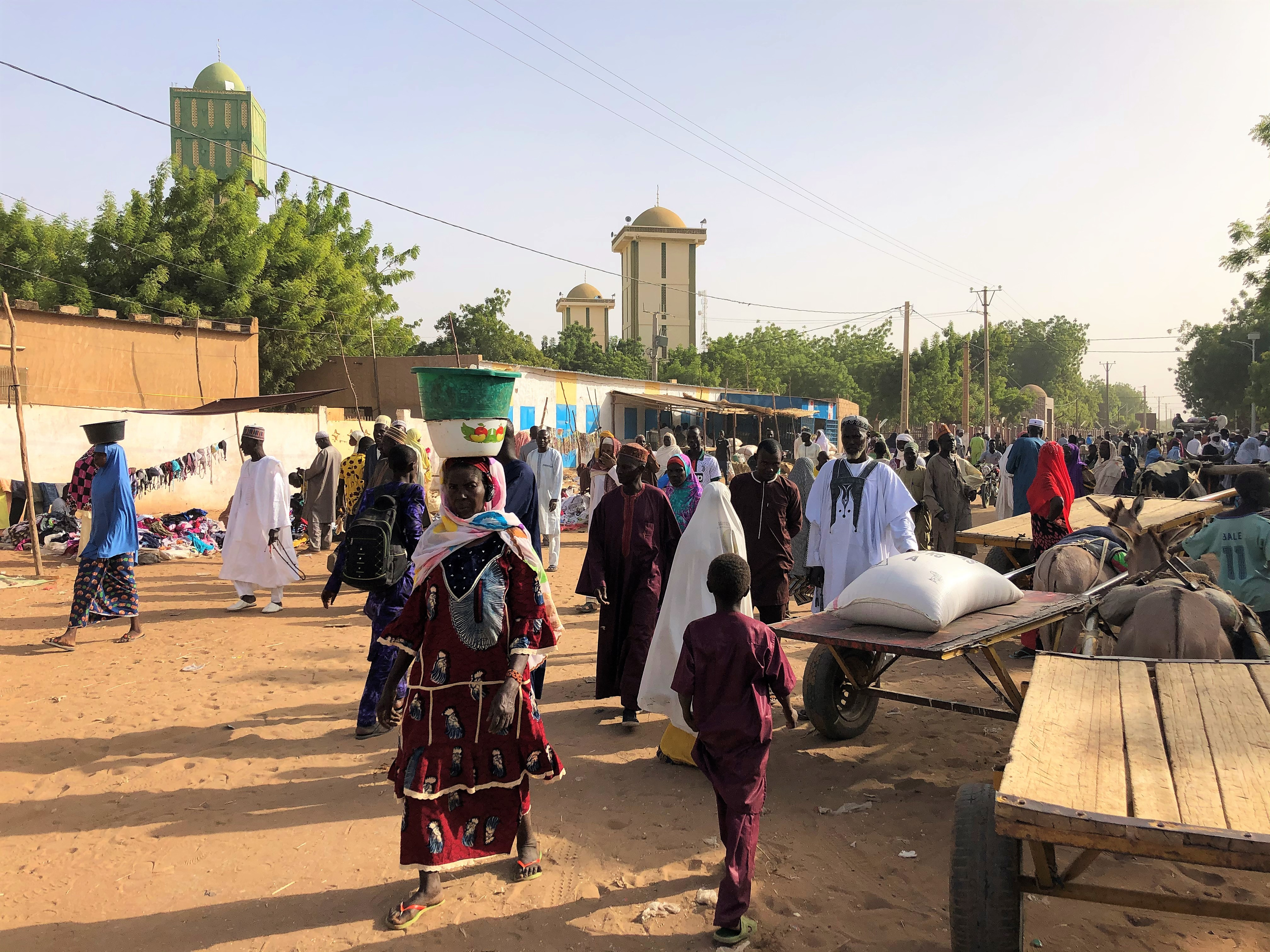
Worshipers leaving the grand mosque of Kiota after Friday prayers

The numbers of animist practitioners are a point of contention. In the late 19th century, much of the south center of the nation was unreached by Islam, and the conversion of some rural areas has been only partial. There are areas where animist based festivals and traditions (such as the Bori religion) are practiced by syncretic Muslim communities (in some Hausa areas as well as among some Toubou and Wodaabe pastoralists), as opposed to several small communities who maintain their pre-Islamic religion. These include the Hausa-speaking Maouri (or Azna, the Hausa word for "pagan") community in Dogondoutci in the south-west and the Kanuri-speaking Manga near Zinder, both of whom practice variations of the pre-Islamic Hausa Maguzawa religion. There are also Boudouma and Songhay animist communities in the south-west. Syncretic practices have become less common among Muslim Nigerien communities.

==== Islam ====
The majority of Muslims in Niger are Sunni, 7% are Shia, 5% are Ahmadiyya, and 20% are non-denominational. Islam was spread into what is now Niger beginning in the 15th century, by both the expansion of the Songhai Empire in the west, and the influence of the Trans-Saharan trade traveling from the Maghreb and Egypt. Tuareg expansion from the north, culminating in their seizure of the far eastern oases from the Kanem–Bornu Empire in the 17th centuries, spread distinctively Berber practices.

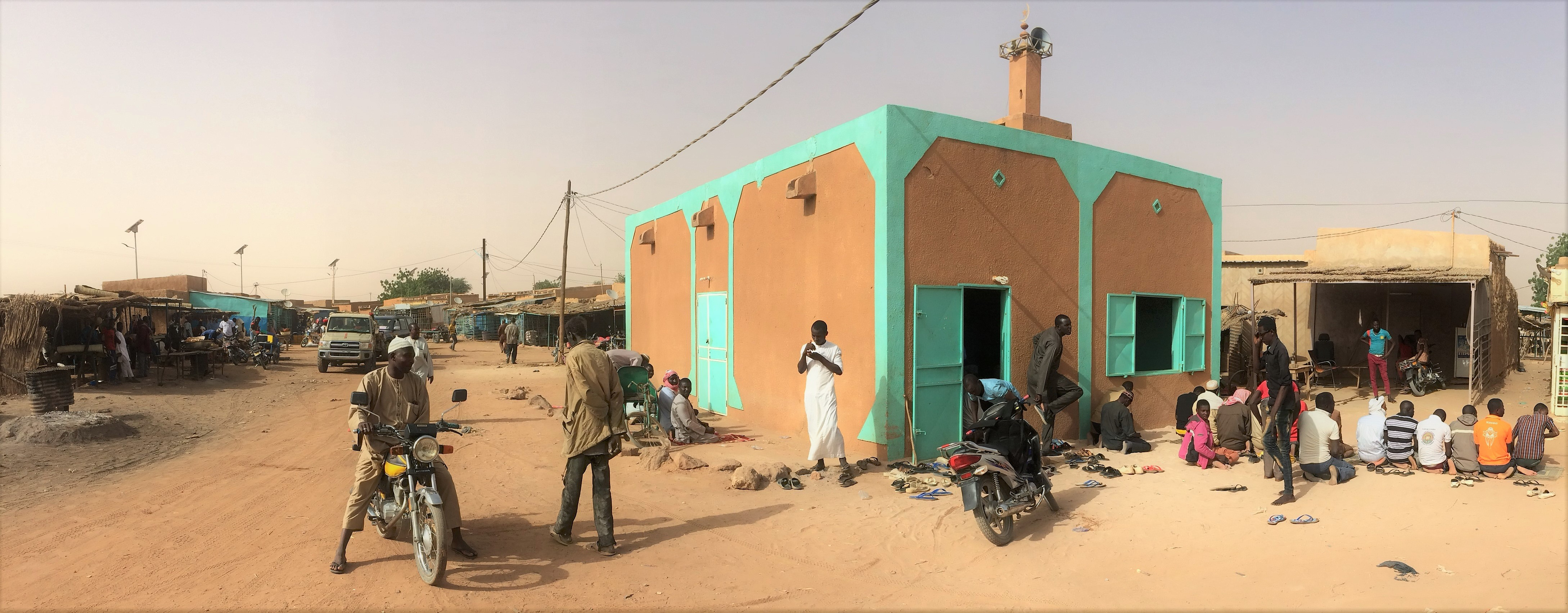
Small mosque in Filingué

Both Zarma and Hausa areas were greatly influenced by the 18th- and 19th-century Fula-led Sufi brotherhoods, most notably the Sokoto Caliphate (in today's Nigeria). Modern Muslim practice in Niger is often tied to the Tijaniya Sufi brotherhoods, although there are small minority groups tied to Hammallism and Nyassist Sufi orders in the west, and the Sanusiya in the far north-east.

A small center of followers of Salafi movement within Sunni Islam have appeared in the last thirty years, in the capital and in Maradi. These small groups, linked to similar groups in Jos, Nigeria, came to public prominence in the 1990s during a series of religious riots.

Despite this, Niger maintains a tradition as a secular state, protected by law. Interfaith relations are deemed very good, and the forms of Islam traditionally practiced in most of the country are marked by tolerance of other faiths and lack of restrictions on personal freedom. Alcohol, such as the locally produced Bière Niger, is sold openly in most of the country.

=== Education ===
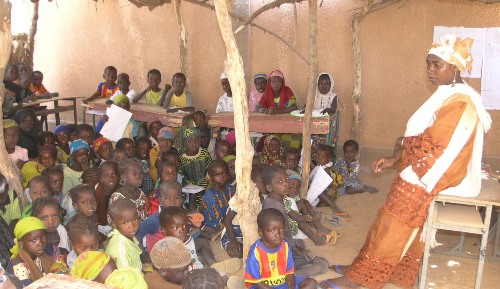
A primary classroom in Niger

The literacy rate is 35.6% (47.9% male and 25.7% female) according to the CIA, and 38% (46% male and 30% female) according to the World Bank, both as of 2022. Primary education in Niger is compulsory for six years. Primary school enrollment and attendance rates are low, particularly for girls. In 1997 the gross primary enrollment rate was 29.3 percent, and in 1996 the net primary enrollment rate was 24.5 percent.

About 60 percent of children who finish primary schools are boys, as the majority of girls rarely attend school for more than a few years. Children are often forced to work rather than attend school, particularly during planting or harvest periods. Nomadic children in the north often do not have access to schools.

=== Health ===
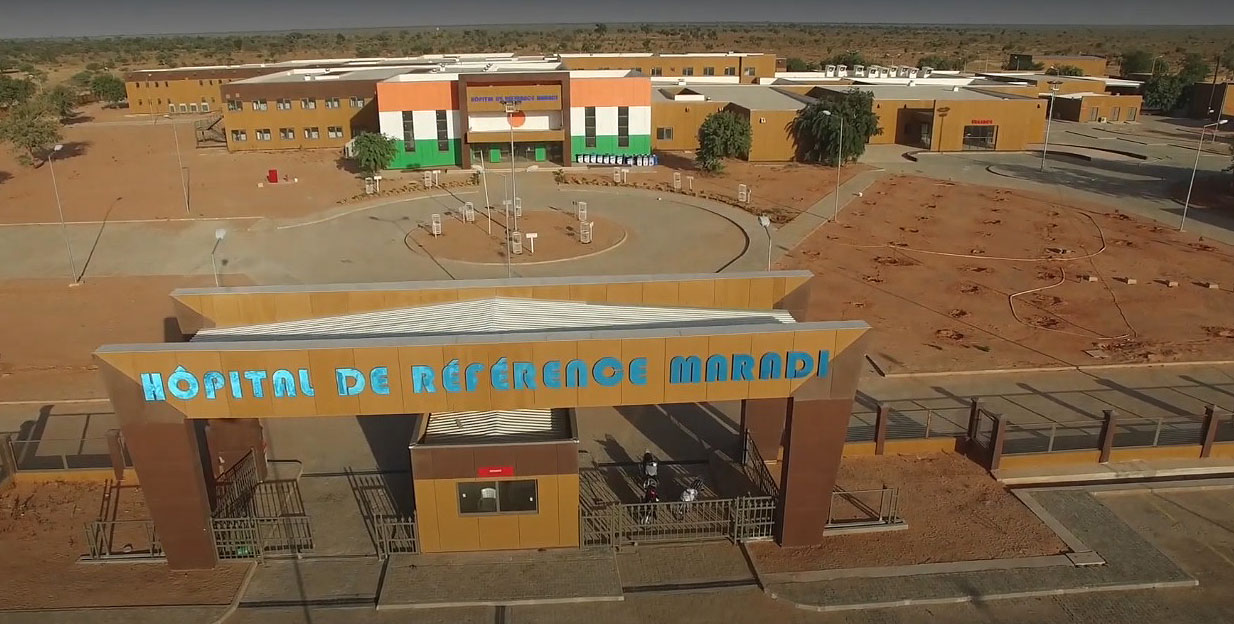
Maradi Reference Hospital

The child mortality rate (deaths among children between ages 1 and 4) is high (248 per 1,000) due to generally poor health conditions and inadequate nutrition. According to Save the Children, Niger has the world's highest infant mortality rate. Niger also has the highest fertility rate in the world (6.49 births per woman according to 2017 estimates); this has resulted in nearly half (49.7%) of the Nigerien population being under age 15 in 2020. Niger has the 11th highest maternal mortality rate in the world at 820 deaths/100,000 live births. There were 3 physicians and 22 nurses per 100,000 persons in 2006.

Clean drinking water is scarce by global standards, with significant differences between urban and rural areas. Niger is listed at the bottom of the UN Human Development Index. Roughly 92% of the population live in rural areas in the Tillabéri region along the western frontier, and there is a chronic scarcity of clean water, particularly during the hot season, when temperatures regularly exceed 40 degrees Celsius. With the help of a donation fund from the Dutch government, the European Investment Bank is collaborating with the Niger water authority to find solutions to Niger's water issues. The World Bank identified Niger as one of the 18 fragile regions of Sub-Saharan Africa. The EU bank has a history of investing in regions like these.

40% of the 30,000 inhabitants in Téra have access to a working public water infrastructure. Société de Patrimoine des Eaux du Niger, Niger's water authority, opened ten boreholes and built a water treatment plant in 2018 to provide potable water to Téra and the surrounding areas. The water supply ran out about a year later, and the water treatment facility was forced to close. The European Investment Bank and the water authority are looking at two options for dealing with Téra's water shortages. The first choice is to repair the water tank on the outskirts of town. Another choice is to treat and transport water from the Niger River, which is located more than 100 kilometres to the east. Villages between Téra and the Niger River will also have access to sewage. The European Investment Bank will also look at renewable energy as a way to save costs.

In the 2024 Global Hunger Index, Niger ranks 121st out of 127 countries with sufficient data. Niger's score of 34.1 indicates a serious level of hunger. In 2025, according to the World Health Organization, Niger became the first African country and the fifth country worldwide to eradicate onchocerciasis.

== Culture ==
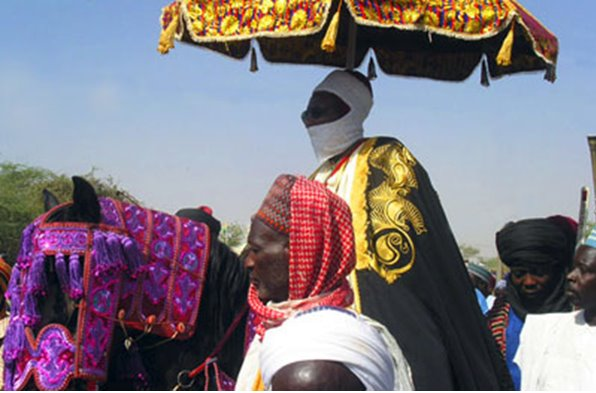
Sultan of Damagaram in the Hausa city of Zinder. The Sultanate continues to operate in a ceremonial function into the 21st century.

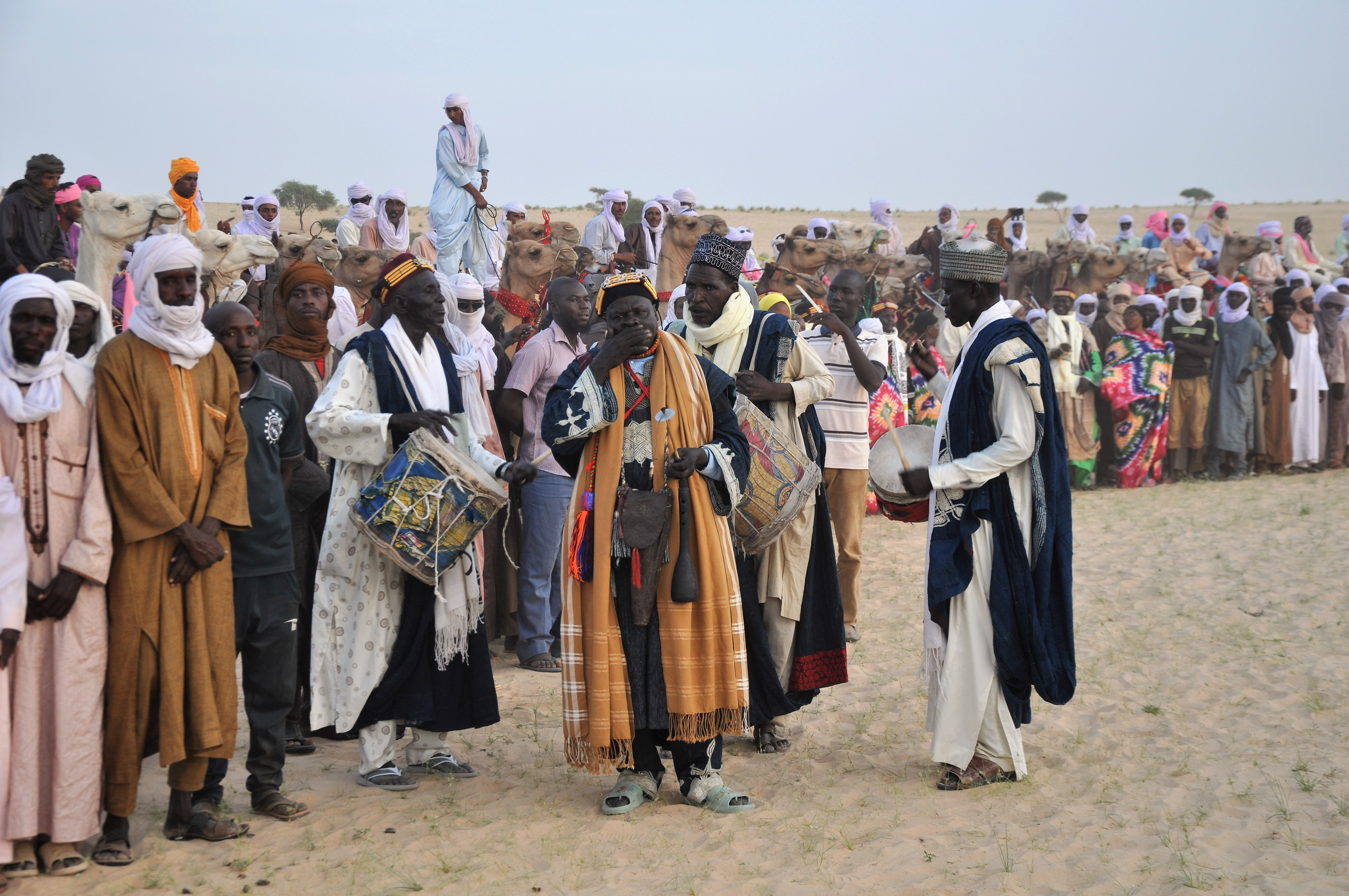
Toubou musicians at a formal ceremony

Nigerien culture is marked by variation, evidence of the cultural crossroads which French colonialism formed into a unified state from the beginning of the 20th century. Niger was created from four distinct cultural areas in the pre-colonial era: the Zarma and Songhai dominated the Niger River valley in the south-west; the northern periphery of Hausaland, made mostly of those states which had resisted the Sokoto Caliphate, and ranged along the long southern border with Nigeria; the Lake Chad basin and Kaouar in the far east, populated by Kanuri farmers and Toubou pastoralists who had once been part of the Kanem–Bornu Empire; and the Tuareg nomads of the Aïr Mountains and the Sahara in the vast north.

Each of these communities, along with smaller ethnic groups, brought their own cultural traditions. While successive post-independence governments have tried to forge a shared national culture, this has been slow forming, in part because the major communities have their own cultural histories, and in part because ethnic groups such as the Hausa, Tuareg and Kanuri are but part of larger ethnic communities which cross borders introduced under colonialism.

Until the 1990s, government and politics was inordinately dominated by Niamey and the Zarma people of the surrounding region. At the same time the plurality of the population, in the Hausa borderlands between Birni-N'Konni and Maine-Soroa, have often looked culturally more to Hausaland in Nigeria than Niamey. Between 1996 and 2003, primary school attendance was around 30%, including 36% of males and only 25% of females. Additional education occurs through madrasas.

=== Festivals and cultural events ===
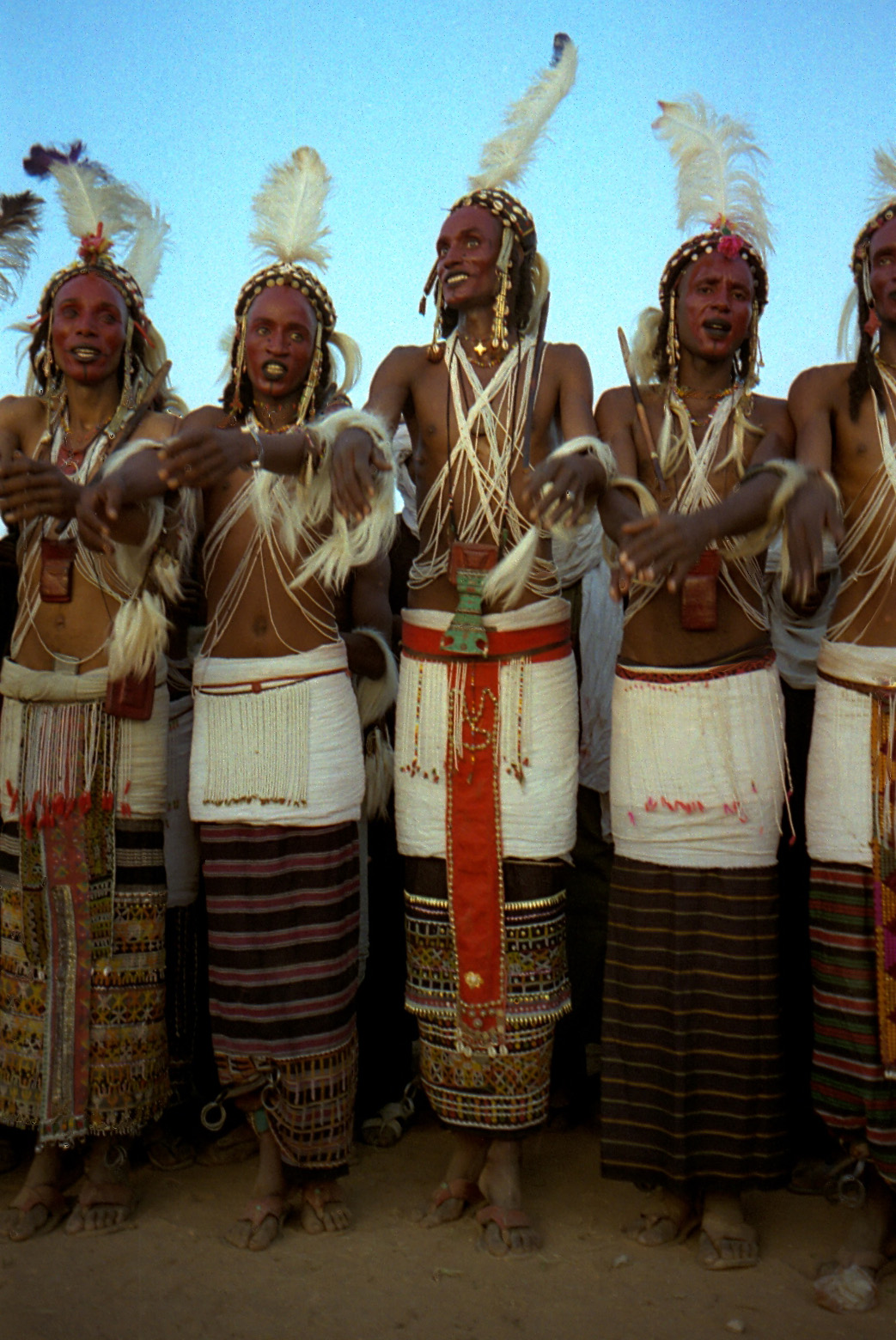
Participants in the Guérewol perform the Guérewol dance, 1997.

The Guérewol festival is a traditional Wodaabe cultural event that takes place in Abalak in Tahoua Region or In'Gall in Agadez Region. It is an annual traditional courtship ritual practiced by the Wodaabe (Fula) peoples. During this ceremony, young men dressed in elaborate ornamentation and made up in traditional face painting gather in lines to dance and sing, vying for the attention of marriageable young women. The Guérewol festival is an international attraction and was featured in films and magazines as prominent as the National Geographic.

"La Cure salée" (English: Salt Cure) is a yearly festival of Tuareg and Wodaabe nomads in In'Gall traditionally to celebrate the end of the rainy season. For three days, the festival features a parade of Tuareg camel riders followed with camel and horse races, songs, dances, and storytelling.

=== Media ===
Niger began developing diverse media in the late 1990s. Prior to the Third Republic, Nigeriens only had access to tightly controlled state media. Now Niamey contains scores of newspapers and magazines; some, like Le Sahel, are government operated, while many are critical of the government. Radio is the most important medium, as television sets are beyond the buying power of many of the rural poor, and illiteracy prevents print media from becoming a mass medium.

In addition to the national and regional radio services of the state broadcaster ORTN, there are four privately owned radio networks which total more than 100 stations. Three of them—the Anfani Group, Sarounia and Tenere—are urban-based commercial-format FM networks in the major towns. There is also a network of over 80 community radio stations spread across all seven regions of the country, governed by the Comité de Pilotage de Radios de Proximité (CPRP), a civil society organisation. The independent-sector radio networks are collectively estimated by CPRP officials to cover some 7.6 million people, or about 73% of the population (2005). The BBC's Hausa service is listened to on FM repeaters across wide parts of the country, particularly in the south. Radio France Internationale rebroadcasts in French through some of the commercial stations, via satellite. Tenere FM runs a national independent television station of the same name.

Despite relative freedom at the national level, Nigerien journalists say they are often pressured by local authorities. The state ORTN network depends financially on the government, partly through a surcharge on electricity bills, and partly through direct subsidy. The sector is governed by the Conseil Supérieur de Communications, established as an independent body in the 1990s. International human rights groups have criticised the government since at least 1996 as using regulation and police to punish criticism of the state.

== See also ==
- Outline of Niger

== Sources ==
- Decalo, Samuel. Historical Dictionary of Niger, 3rd ed. (Scarecrow Press, 1997, ISBN 0-8108-3136-8) – a comprehensive collection of Niger topics
- CIA World Factbook (entry on Niger Archived 30 March 2021 at the Wayback Machine)
- US State Department "Niger". State.gov. 3 February 2010. Archived from the original on 22 January 2017. Note: This article contains material from the State Department website.
- Unicef Niger statistics Archived 30 November 2009 at the Wayback Machine
- Unesco manuscript on child work and schooling in Niger
