= Lété Island =

Largest island in the Niger River

Coordinates: 12°8′N 3°10′E

Native name: Île de Lété
- Lété Island (middle) in the Niger River

Geography
- Location: Niger River
- Length: 16 km (9.9 mi)
- Width: 4 km (2.5 mi)

Administration
- Niger
- Region: Dosso

Lété Island (French: Île de Lété) is the largest island in the Niger River, at a length of approximately 16 kilometres and a width of 4 kilometres. Together with other smaller islands in the Niger River, it was the main focus of a border dispute between Niger and Benin, which began when the two countries were still under French rule. The island was historically used by semi-nomadic Fula cattle herders as a dry season pasturage, but farmers began permanently settling on the island after the resolution of the border dispute in 2005.

== Geography ==
Lété Island is approximately 16 kilometres long and 4 kilometres wide, making it the largest island in the Niger River. The river surrounds the island on two sides, with the smaller branch to the north and the larger one to the south. Groundwater fluctuations during the wet season regularly cause the Niger River to overflow and flood the island, which previously kept human activity off the island.

== History ==
France used the Niger River to demarcate the border between its colonies of Niger and Benin, then constituent parts of French West Africa. However, this led to post-independence tensions between the two as both claimed Lété Island, which lied in the middle of the river. Niger and Benin almost went to war over the island in 1963 amid deteriorating relations, but they ultimately chose to find a diplomatic solution following mediation by neighbouring countries. In the early 1990s, a joint delimitation commission was tasked with solving the issue but could not reach an agreement. After decades without a resolution, the two countries chose in 2001 to have the International Court of Justice rule conclusively on the matter. The court ruled in Niger's favour in 2005.

Historically, semi-nomadic Fula herders brought their cattle to the island to pasture. However, following the resolution of the border dispute, Nigeriens began permanently settling and starting farms on Lété Island. Because of the island's frequent flooding, residents have adapted by primarily growing rice with modern technology and techniques.

== See also ==
- Benin–Niger border
