= Telephone numbers in Niger =

- Country: Niger
- Continent: Africa
- Country code: +227
- International access: 00
- Long-distance: none

The following are the telephone codes in Niger.

== Calling formats ==
• +227 ABPQMCDU

The new National Numbering Plan (NNP) of Niger is structured as eight digits, in the following form: ABPQMCDU

In this structure, all the letters may be given values of 0 to 9. The first two digits AB identify the service or the network, while the remaining six digits PQMCDU identify the user unless some other specific meaning has been assigned.

The figure assigned to the letter A indicates the service or network, while the figure assigned to the letter B indicates the operator, the technology or the service.

== Changes to the number plan in 2006 ==
Intelligent network
Operator	Old number	New number
SONITEL S.A.	300 XXX; 700 XXX	08 300 XXX; 08 700 XXX

Value-added services
Service Type	Operator	Old number	New number
Electronic messaging and web service	SAHELCOM S.A.	86 12 XX	09 86 12 XX
Voice server	AFREETEL	86 20 XX	09 86 20 XX

Fixed-network services - SONITEL S.A.
Geographical area	Old number	New number
Agadez	44 XX XX	20 44 XX XX
Arlit	45 XX XX	20 45 XX XX
Diffa	54 XX XX	20 54 XX XX
Dosso	65 XX XX	20 65 XX XX
Filingué	77 XX XX	20 77 XX XX
Gaya	68 XX XX	20 68 XX XX
Konni	64 XX XX	20 64 XX XX
Maradi	41 XX XX	20 41 XX XX
Niamey	20 XX XX	20 20 XX XX
Niamey	20 XX XX	20 20 XX XX
Niamey	23 XX XX	23 23 XX XX
Niamey	31 XX XX	20 31 XX XX
Niamey	32 XX XX	20 32 XX XX
Niamey	33 XX XX	20 33 XX XX
Niamey	34 XX XX	20 34 XX XX
Niamey	35 XX XX	20 35 XX XX
Niamey	36 XX XX	20 36 XX XX
Niamey	37 XX XX	20 37 XX XX
Niamey	72 XX XX	20 72 XX XX
Niamey	73 XX XX	20 73 XX XX
Niamey	74 XX XX	20 74 XX XX
Niamey	75 XX XX	20 75 XX XX
Say	78 XX XX	20 78 XX XX
Tahoua	61 XX XX	20 67 XX XX
Tillabéry	71 XX XX	20 71 XX XX
Zinder	51 XX XX	20 51 XX XX

Wireless Local Loop (WLL)
Operator	Old number	New number
SONITEL S.A. (CDMA)	-	21 41 XXXX
SONITEL S.A. (CDMA)	-	21 44 XXXX
SONITEL S.A. (CDMA)	-	21 45 XXXX
SONITEL S.A. (CDMA)	-	21 51 XXXX
SONITEL S.A. (CDMA)	-	21 54 XXXX
SONITEL S.A. (CDMA)	-	21 61 XXXX
SONITEL S.A. (CDMA)	-	21 64 XXXX
SONITEL S.A. (CDMA)	-	21 65 XXXX
SONITEL S.A. (CDMA)	-	21 66 XXXX
SONITEL S.A. (CDMA)	-	21 68 XXXX
SONITEL S.A. (CDMA)	-	21 71 XXXX
SONITEL S.A. (CDMA)	76 XX XX	21 76 XX XX
SONITEL S.A. (CDMA)	79 XX XX	21 79 XX XX
SONITEL S.A. (CDMA)	-	21 88 XXXX

Mobile-network services
Operator	Old number PQMCDU	New number ABPQMCDU
CELTEL	05 XX XX	96 05 XX XX
CELTEL	06 XX XX	96 06 XX XX
CELTEL	07 XX XX	96 07 XX XX
CELTEL	08 XX XX	96 08 XX XX
CELTEL	-	96 09 XXXX
CELTEL	-	96 10 XX XX
CELTEL	-	96 11 XX XX
CELTEL	-	96 12 XX XX
CELTEL	-	96 13 XX XX
CELTEL	-	96 14 XX XX
CELTEL	-	96 15 XX XX
CELTEL	-	96 16 XX XX
CELTEL	-	96 17 XX XX
CELTEL	-	96 18 XX XX
CELTEL	-	96 19 XX XX
CELTEL	-	96 20XX XX
CELTEL	-	96 21XX XX
CELTEL	-	96 22XX XX
CELTEL	-	96 23XX XX
CELTEL	-	96 24XX XX
CELTEL	-	96 25XX XX
CELTEL	26 XX XX	96 26 XX XX
CELTEL	27 XX XX	96 27 XX XX
CELTEL	28 XX XX	96 28 XX XX
CELTEL	29 XX XX	96 29 XX XX
CELTEL	40 XX XX	96 40 XX XX
CELTEL	42 XX XX	96 42 XX XX
CELTEL	43 XX XX	96 43 XX XX
CELTEL	46 XX XX	96 46 XX XX
CELTEL	47 XX XX	96 47 XX XX
CELTEL	48 XX XX	96 48 XX XX
CELTEL	49 XX XX	96 49 XX XX
CELTEL	50 XX XX	96 50 XX XX
CELTEL	52 XX XX	96 52 XX XX
CELTEL	53 XX XX	96 53 XX XX
CELTEL	55 XX XX	96 55 XX XX
CELTEL	56 XX XX	96 56 XX XX
CELTEL	57 XX XX	96 57 XX XX
CELTEL	58 XX XX	96 58 XX XX
CELTEL	59 XX XX	96 59 XX XX
CELTEL	66 XX XX	96 66 XX XX
CELTEL	67 XX XX	96 67 XX XX
CELTEL	87 XX XX	96 87 XX XX
CELTEL	88 XX XX	96 88 XX XX
CELTEL	89 XX XX	96 89 XX XX
CELTEL	96 XX XX	96 96 XX XX
CELTEL	97 XX XX	96 97 XX XX
CELTEL	98 XX XX	96 98 XX XX
CELTEL	99 XX XX	96 99 XX XX
SAHELCOM	21 XX XX	93 21 XX XX
SAHELCOM	22 XX XX	93 22 XX XX
SAHELCOM	23 XX XX	93 23 XX XX
SAHELCOM	80 XX XX	93 80 XX XX
SAHELCOM	81 XX XX	93 81 XX XX
SAHELCOM	82 XX XX	93 82 XX XX
SAHELCOM	83 XX XX	93 83 XX XX
SAHELCOM	90 XX XX	93 90 XX XX
SAHELCOM	91 XX XX	93 91 XX XX
SAHELCOM	92 XX XX	93 92 XX XX
SAHELCOM	93 XX XX	93 93 XX XX
TELECEL	24 XX XX	94 24 XX XX
TELECEL	25 XX XX	94 25 XX XX
TELECEL	-	94 28 XX XX
TELECEL	62 XX XX	94 62 XX XX
TELECEL	63 XX XX	94 63 XX XX
TELECEL	84 XX XX	94 84 XX XX
TELECEL	85 XX XX	94 85 XX XX
TELECEL	94 XX XX	94 94 XX XX
TELECEL	95 XX XX	94 95 XX XX

Short numbers for value-added services
Service	Operator	Number series
Value-added service	PLUS SMS Niger	22 XXXX
Value-added service	PLUS SMS Niger	25 XXXX
Value-added service	PLUS SMS Niger	46 XXXX
Value-added service	PLUS SMS Niger	57 XXXX
Value-added service	PLUS SMS Niger	73 XXXX
Value-added service	PLUS SMS Niger	252 XXXX
Value-added service	PLUS SMS Niger	466 XXXX
Value-added service	PLUS SMS Niger	473 XXXX
Value-added service	PLUS SMS Niger	658 XXXX
Value-added service	PLUS SMS Niger	876 XXXX

Short numbers
ABP	Service or network	Operator(s)
100	Credit enquiry	TELECEL
101	Replenishment of account	-
111	Prepaid customer service	CELTEL
112	Emergency calls	CELTEL, SAHELCOM, TELECEL
120	Voice messaging	CELTEL
123	Large accounts, voice messaging	CELTEL, SAHELCOM, TELECEL
124	Sending of voice messages	SAHELCOM
130	Loading of account	CELTEL
131	Loading of account	-
133	Credit enquiry	-
140	Change of language	-
155	Postpaid customer service	-
160	SMS credit enquiry	-
222	Distribution, prepaid service	CELTEL, SAHELCOM, TELECEL
333	After-sales service	SAHELCOM, TELECEL
555	Customer service	SAHELCOM
888	Customer service	TELECEL
