= Benin–Niger border =

International border

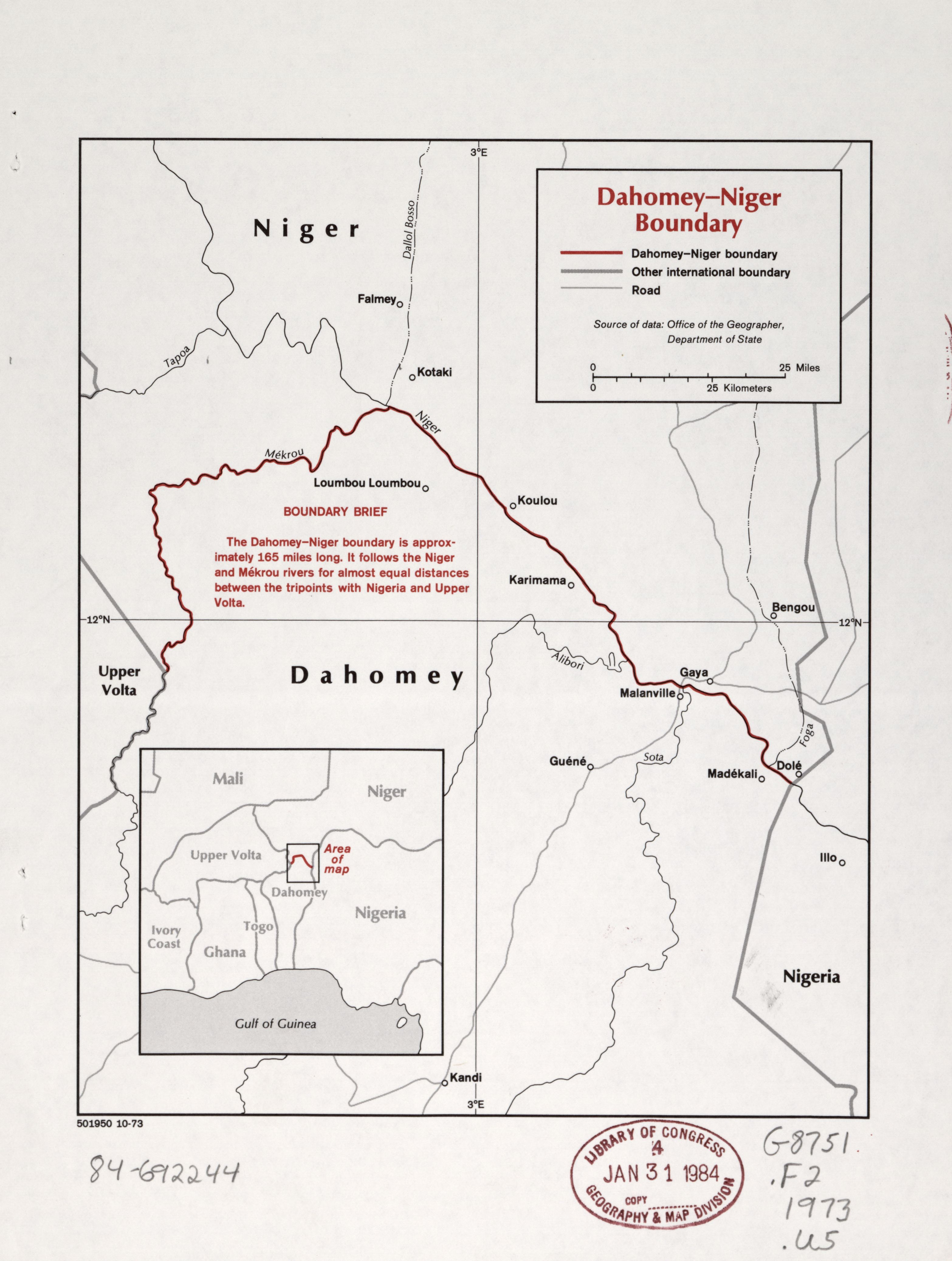
Map of the Benin (form. Dahomey)-Niger border

The Benin–Niger border is 277 km (172 mi) in length and runs from the tripoint with Burkina Faso in the west to the tripoint with Nigeria in the east.

== Description ==
The Benin–Niger border starts in the north-west at the tripoint with Burkina Faso in the Mékrou River, then follows this river in a north-eastwards direction before reaching the Niger River. The border then follows the Niger River south-eastwards to the Nigerian tripoint. The entire Mékrou river section of the boundary falls within the trans-border W National Park, home to numerous species such as hippos and elephants. Furthermore, the Nigerien side of the Niger river section is protected as the Dosso Reserve, which protects one of the last remaining populations of West African giraffe.

== History ==
The 1880s saw an intense competition between the European powers for territories in Africa, a process known as the Scramble for Africa. This culminated in the Berlin Conference of 1884, in which the European nations concerned agreed upon their respective territorial claims and the rules of engagements going forward. As a result of this France gained control of the upper valley of the Niger River (roughly equivalent to the areas of modern Mali and Niger). France began occupying the area of modern Benin from 1893, later naming it Dahomey; the area encompassing the territory of modern Niger was conquered in 1900. Both areas came the control of the federal colony of French West Africa (Afrique occidentale française, abbreviated AOF). The rivers Niger and Mékrou were confirmed as forming the boundary between Niger and Dahomey in a French statute of 27 October 1938.

As the movement for decolonisation grew in the post-Second World War era, France gradually granted more political rights and representation for its African colonies, culminating in the granting of broad internal autonomy to each colony in 1958 within the framework of the French Community. In August 1960 both Niger and Dahomey (renamed Benin in 1975) gained full independence, and their mutual frontier became an international one between two sovereign states.

Since independence there were a number of disputes over the precise allocation of 24 riverine islands, most notably Lété Island, none of which had been covered by the colonial-era boundary agreement. The two states forwarded the case to the International Court of Justice in 2001; in 2005 the ICJ adjudicated on the matter, awarding 16 islands to Niger and nine to Benin.

== Settlements ==
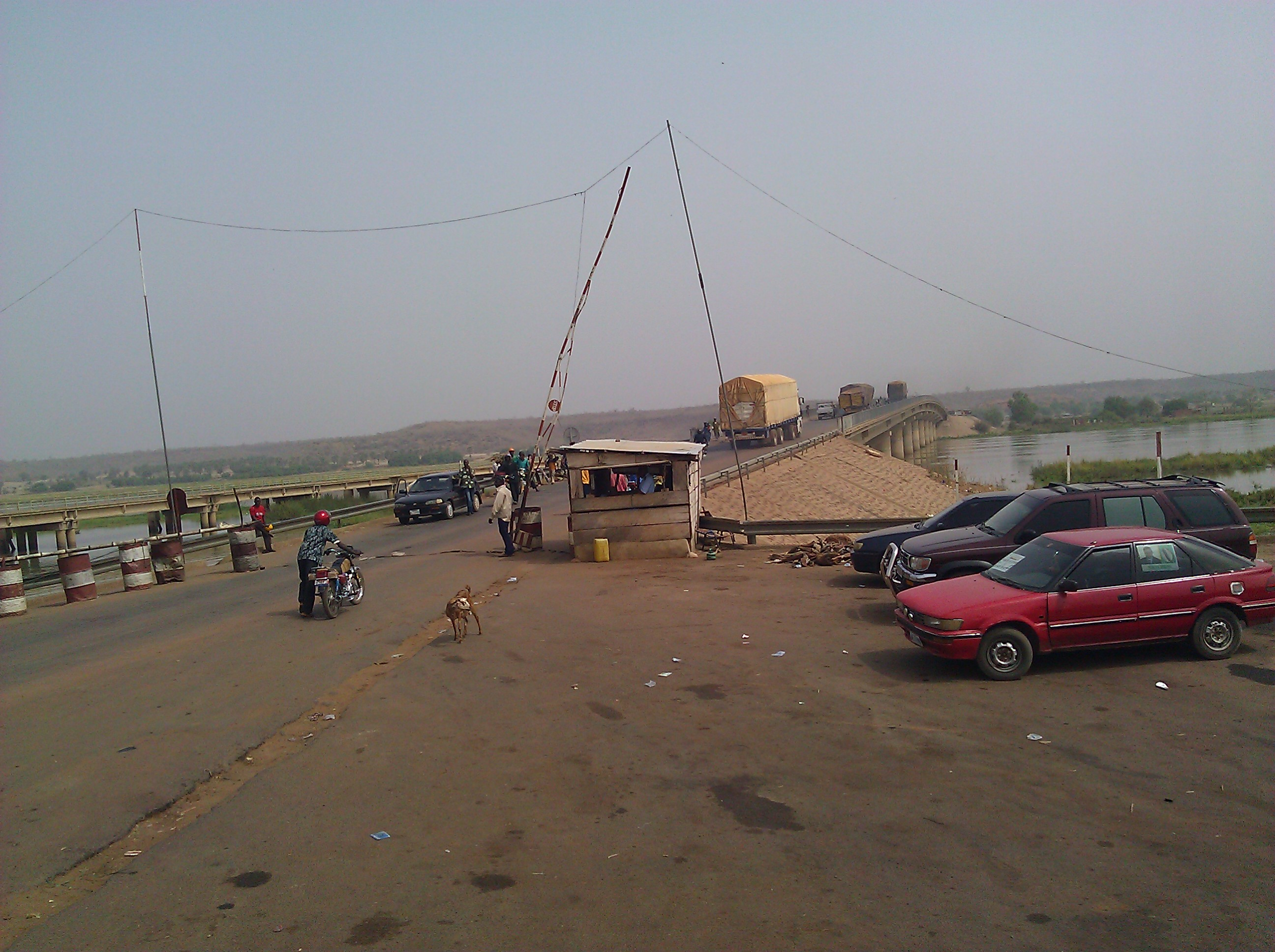
The border crossing at Malanville-Gaya

=== Benin ===
- Pékinga
- Compa
- Karimama
- Malanville
- Mandécali

=== Niger ===
- Koulou
- Sia
- Tenda
- Tara
- Gaya

== Border crossings ==
The main border crossing is located at Malanville (Benin)-Gaya (Niger). It is also possible to travel via the W National Park, where the border itself is open.

== See also ==
- Benin-Niger relations
