= Nigerien Basketball Federation =

- Sport: Basketball
- Founded: 1963
- CEO: Dr. Djamila Ferdjani
- No. of teams: eight regional leagues, National league on hiatus since 2004
- Country: Niger
- Website: http://fnbasket.webs.com/

The Nigerian Basketball Federation(Fédération_Nigérienne_de_Basket-Ball / FENIBASKET) is the governing body for men's and women's basketball in Niger. FENIBASKET has been an affiliate of FIBA Africa since 1963 and its offices are located in Niamey. Its president is Djamila Ferdjani and its Secretary General is Saley Amadou Djingarey. Djamila Ferdjani, the first woman to hold the post, was elected in February 2009, following the retirement of Seini Yaye.

While the Men's national league (championnat national du basketball) has not operated since 2004, there are plans for it to recommence in December 2009. FENIBASKET organizes the Super coupe de basket-ball (renamed the coupe du Président de la République), a yearly knock out tournament, as well as leagues for both men and women in each of Niger's eight Regions.
