= Commune II (Niamey) =

Coordinates: 13°30′43″N 2°06′28″E

- Commune
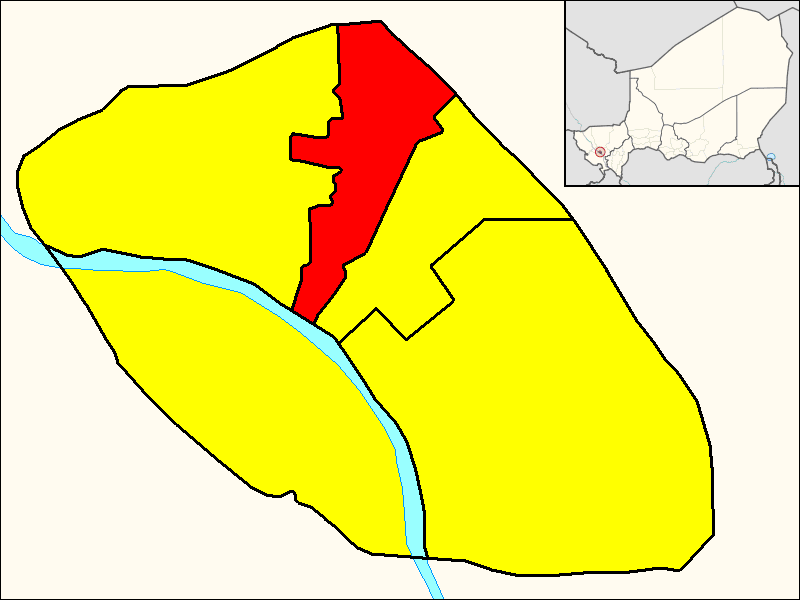
- Commune II within Niamey
- Country: Niger
- Region: Niamey

Population
  - Estimate (October 1, 2020): 320,987
- Time zone: UTC+1 (WAT)

Commune II (Niamey), also known as Niamey II, is an urban commune in Niger. It is a commune of the capital city of Niamey. Niamey 2 joined the UNESCO Global Network of Learning Cities in 2025.

== Quartiers and villages ==
Niamey II contains 22 quartiers:

- Banifandou I
- Banizoumbou
- Boukoki I
- Boukoki II
- Boukoki III
- Cité Député
- Cité des Progrès
- Dan-Zama Koira
- Dar Es Salam
- Deyzébon
- Gandatché
- Issa Béri
- Kalley Plateau
- Koira Tégui Foulan Koira
- Kombo
- Kouaramé
- Lazaret
- Maourey
- Nord Faisceau
- Nord Lazaret
- Tourakou
- Zongo

It contains 5 villages:

- Gorou Béri
- Gorou Kaina
- Bossey Bongou Château
- Fondoga
- Gorou Kaina Bantanaydo
