= Niamey =

Capital and the largest city of Niger

Niamey: Ɲamay (Zarma); Yamai (Hausa)
- Capital district

Names transcription(s)
  - Hausa: یَمَیْ
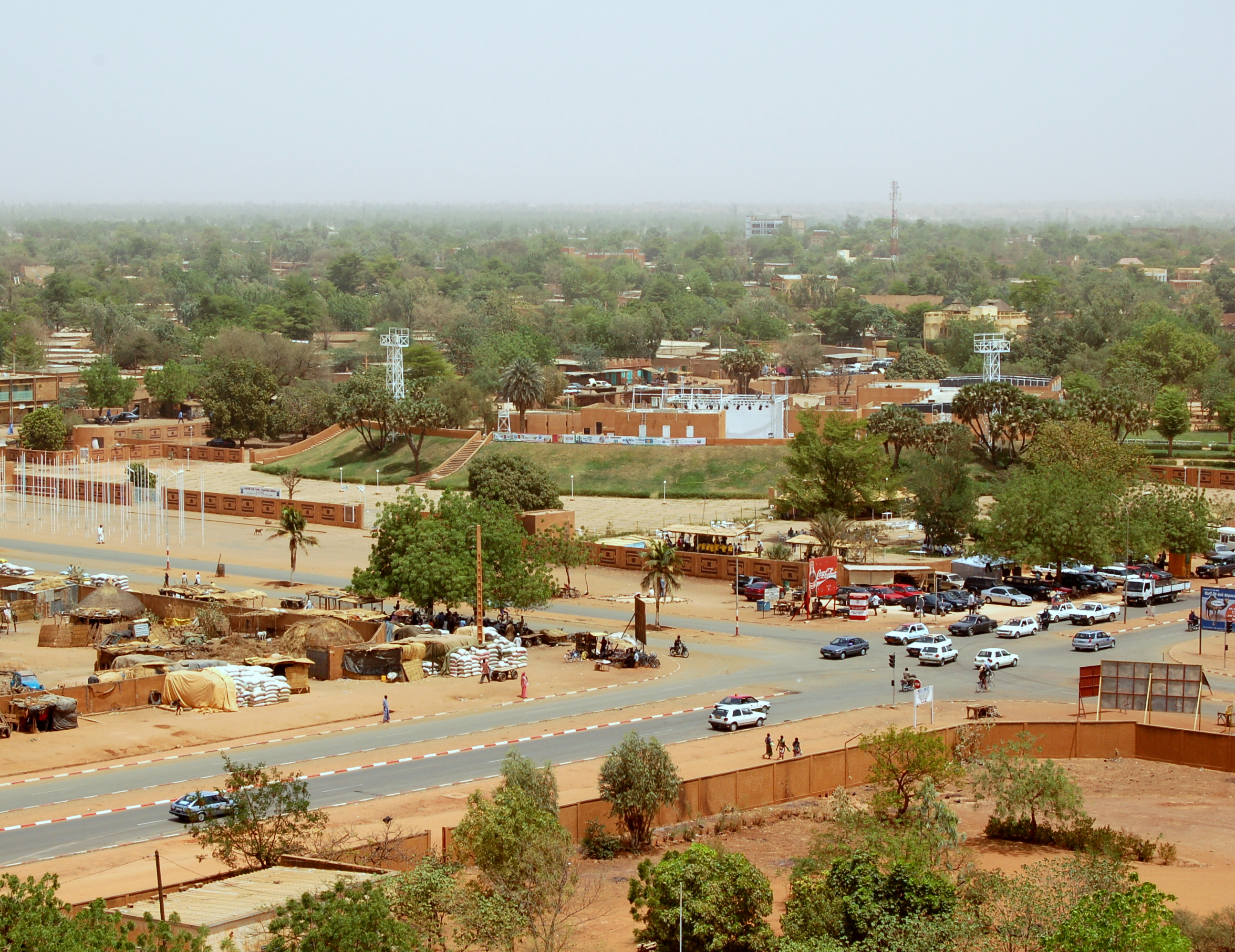
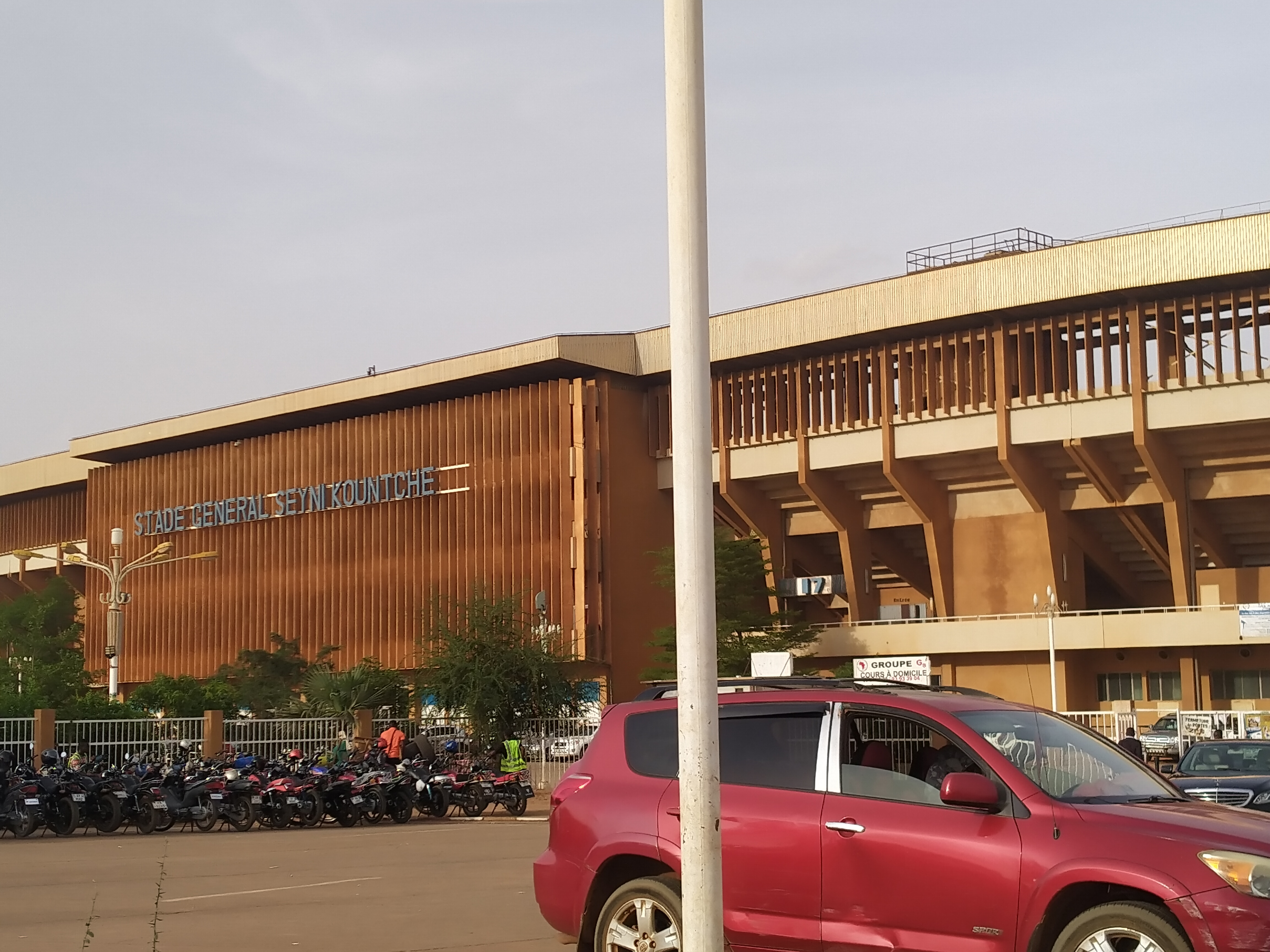
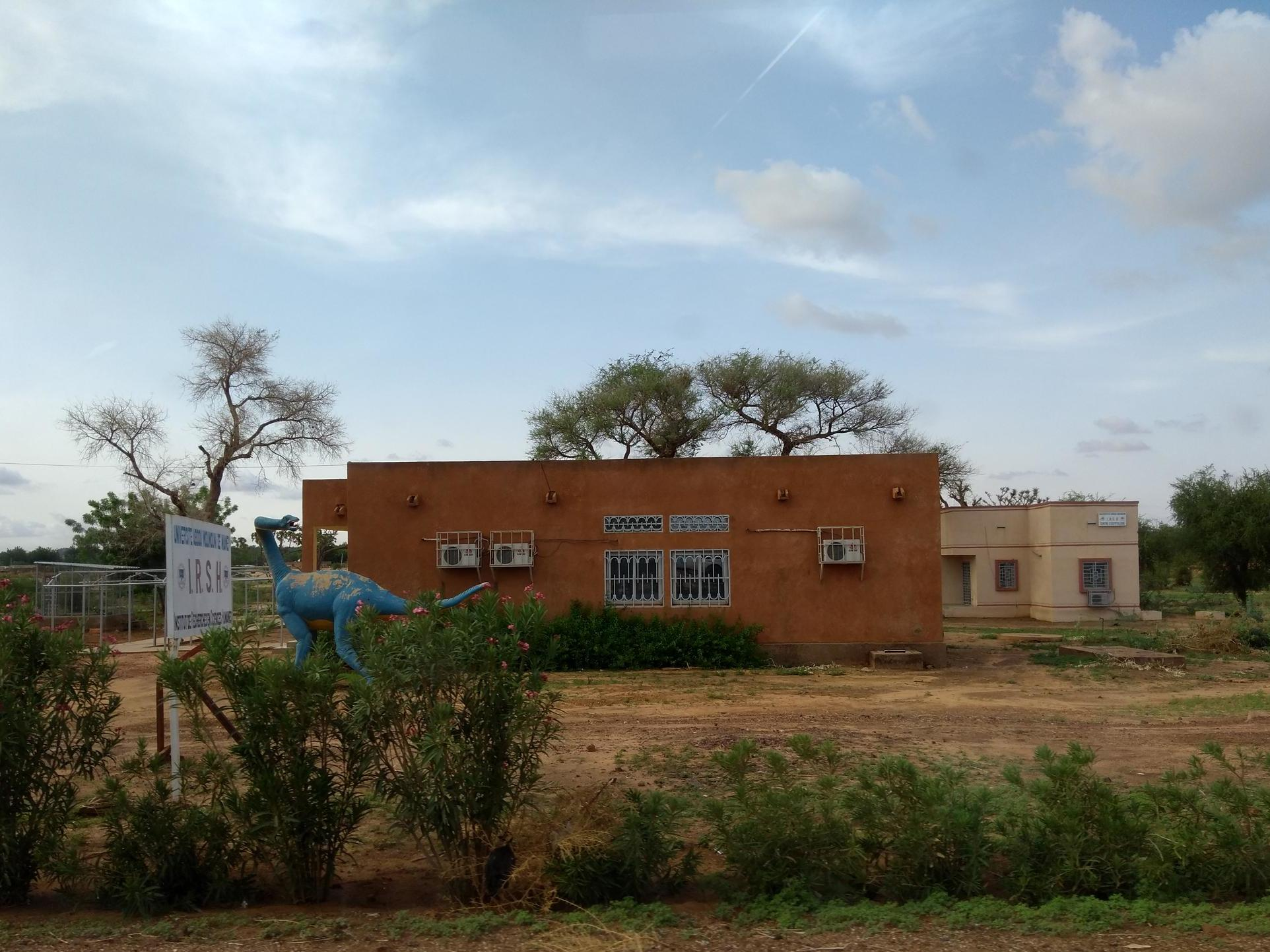
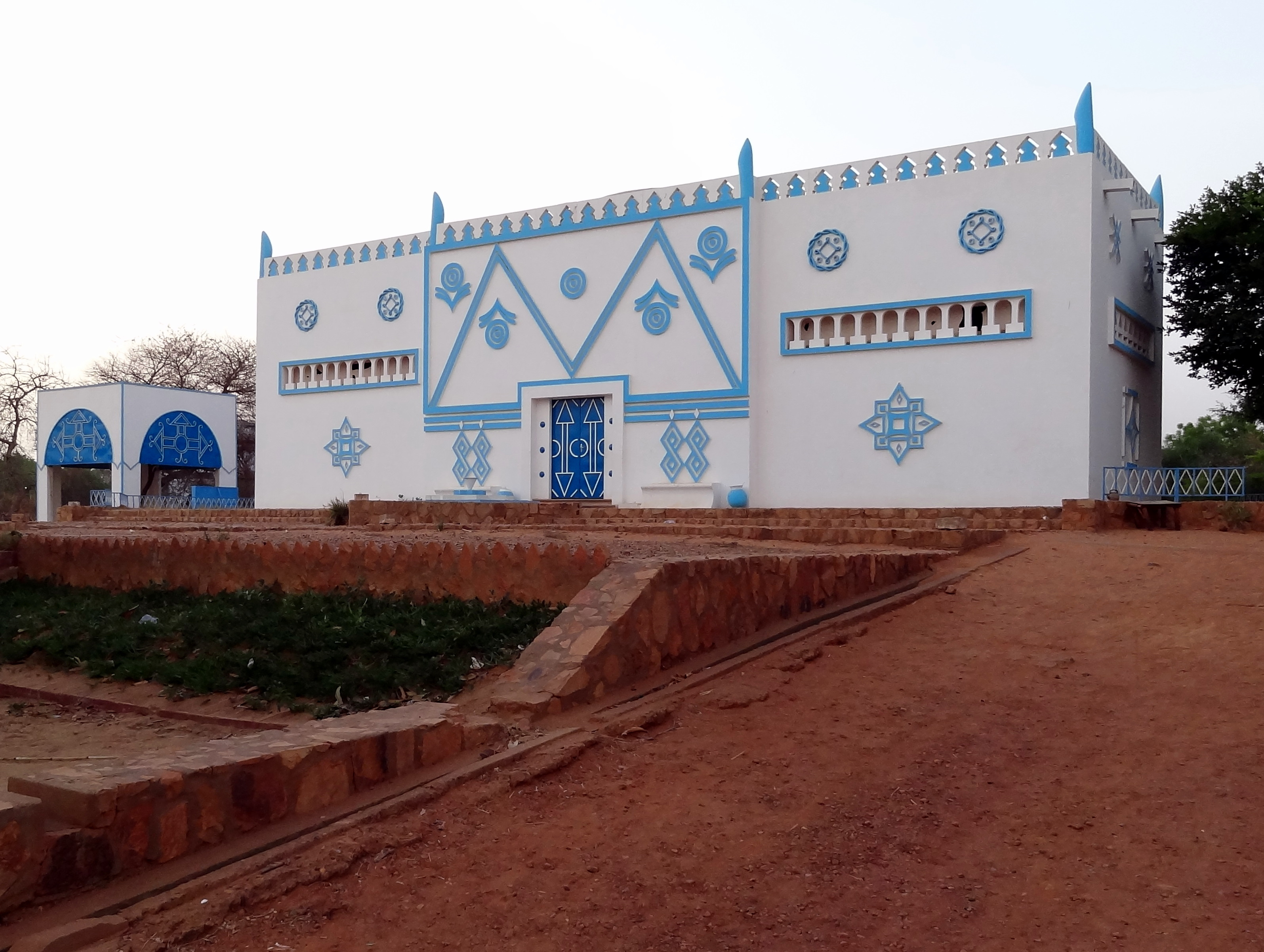
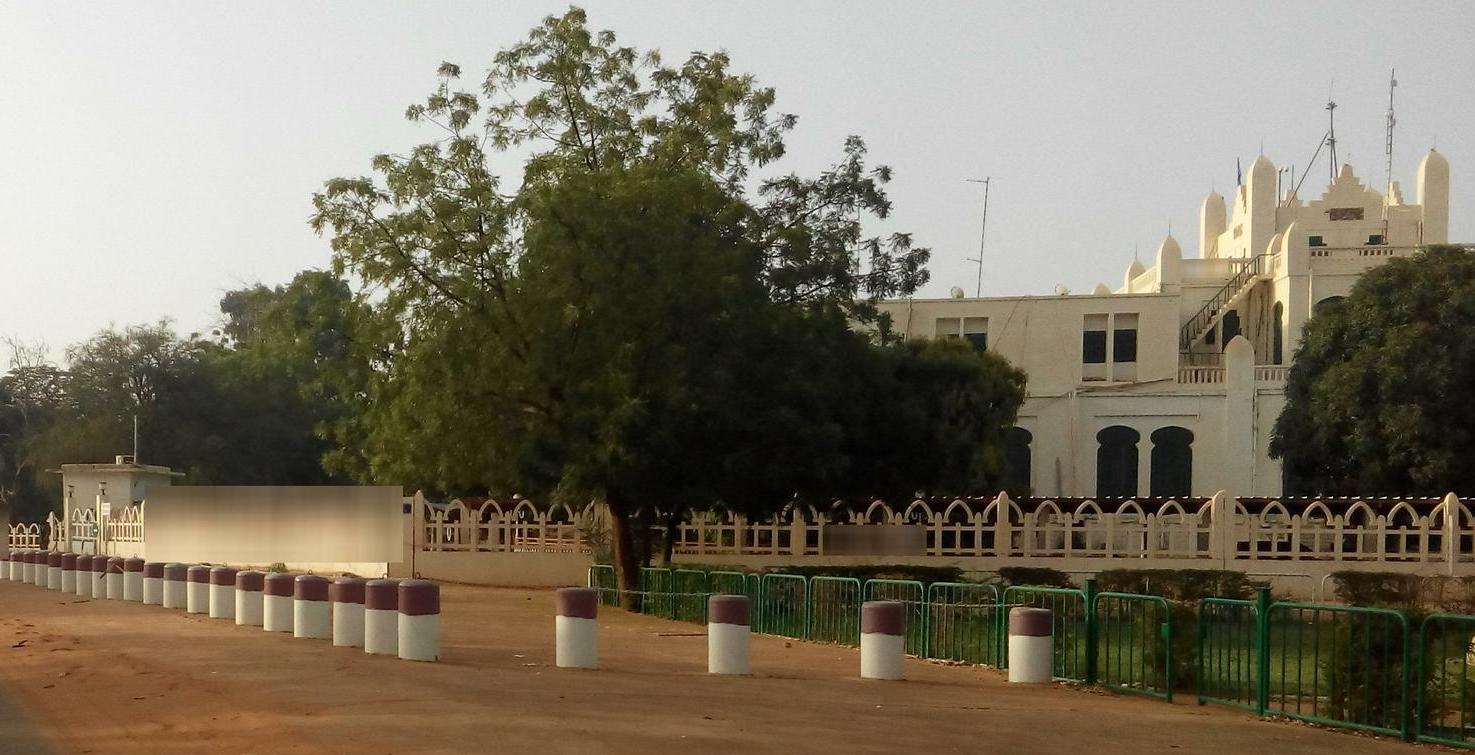
- Niamey seen from the Grand Mosque Stade Général Seyni Kountché Abdou Moumouni University Musée National Boubou Hama Old Presidential Palace

- Seal

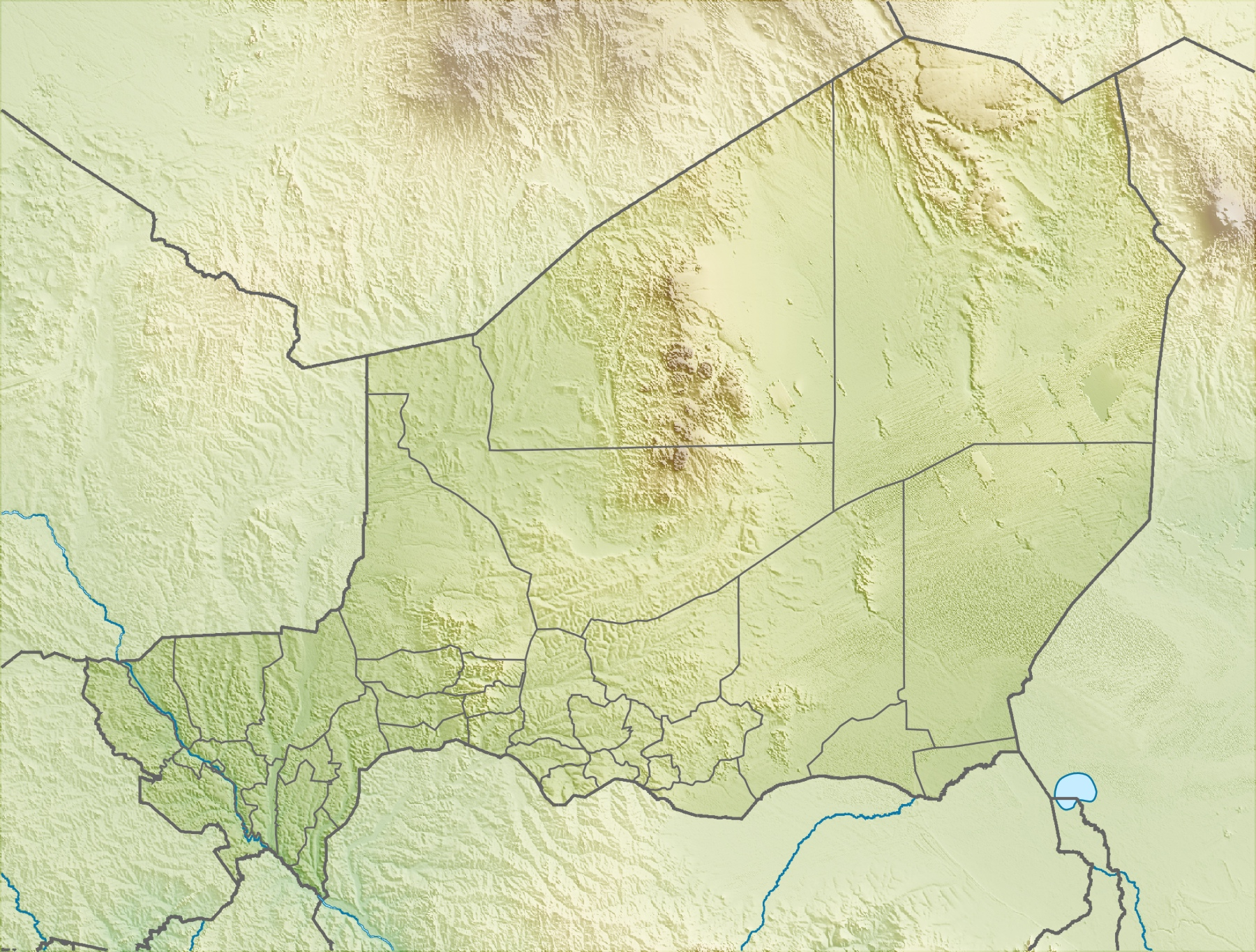
- Location within Niger Location within Africa
- Coordinates: 13°30′49″N 02°06′32″E
- Country: Niger
- Region: Niamey Urban Community
- Communes Urbaines: Niamey I; Niamey II; Niamey III; Niamey IV; Niamey V
- Founded as French post: 1901
- Founder: Henri Salaman
- Boroughs: 90 quartiers; 37 attached villages

Government
  - Type: Appointed regional government, dissolved local government
  - Governor: Oudou Ambouka
  - Mayor: Vacant since 2024

Area
  - Capital district: 552.27 km^{2} (213.23 sq mi)
  - Urban: 297.46 km^{2} (114.85 sq mi)
- Highest elevation: 250 m (820 ft)
- Lowest elevation: 180 m (590 ft)

Population (2012)
  - Capital district: 1,026,848
  - Estimate (2022): 1,407,635
  - Density: 1,859.3/km^{2} (4,815.6/sq mi)
  - Urban density: 2,549/km^{2} (6,600/sq mi)
- Niamey Urban Community
- Time zone: UTC+01:00 (WAT)
- Area code: 20
- ISO 3166 code: NE-8
- HDI (2023): 0.512 low · 1st
- Website: villedeniamey.ne

Niamey (Note: French pronunciation: [njamɛ]) is the capital and largest city of Niger. It is in the western part of the country, surrounded by the Tillabéri Region. Niamey lies on the Niger River, primarily situated on the river's left bank (east side). The capital of Niger since the colonial era, Niamey is an ethnically diverse city and the country's main economic centre.

Before the French developed it as a colonial centre, Niamey was the site of villages inhabited by Fula, Zarma, Maouri, and Songhai people. French expeditions first visited the location in the 1890s before Captain Henri Salaman established a military post in 1901. Niamey replaced Zinder as the territorial capital from 1903 to 1911 and again in 1926, after which large-scale development occurred. The first city plan in 1930 relocated neighbourhoods and enacted segregation of European and indigenous neighbourhoods, which remained separate until the 1950s. Niamey held Niger's first municipal elections in 1956, electing Djibo Bakary as the first mayor. In the decade following independence in 1960, urban planning introduced infrastructure such as the Kennedy Bridge, which connected the city to the right bank. In the 1970s and 1980s, Niamey's growth was fuelled by a boom in the national uranium industry and by droughts that brought rural migrants. Protests in Niamey contributed to the democratisation of Niger in the 1990s. This era saw an Islamic revival.

Niamey has a dense city centre and includes some villages in the periphery. Due to rapid population growth, the city has many informal settlements, allocated semi-legally from chiefs of traditional governments, which are often excluded from public utilities. The city's economy is dominated by commerce, largely in the informal economy. The city also has extensive urban agriculture. Alongside the Zarma people, Niamey has a large Hausa population, who often seasonally migrate from rural Niger. Both groups' languages are used as lingua francas. Most of the population follows Islam—including the Tariqa movement of Sufism and the newer Izala movement of Salafism—with a Christian minority. Niamey is one of the hottest major cities in the world. It is prone to droughts and floods. The Niger River is the city's only permanent river and the sole source of its municipal water supply.

Niamey comprises the Niamey Urban Community (French: Communauté Urbaine de Niamey, CUN), a first-level division of Niger, led by the Governor of Niamey. It is divided into five communes: Niamey I, II, III, and IV on the left bank, and V on the right bank. The city also has a municipal government, though it was dissolved in 2024. Transportation links include Diori Hamani International Airport, highways including RN1, and the unused Niamey railway station. Niamey is home to Abdou Moumouni University, Niger's most important university, and Niamey National Hospital, the country's largest referral hospital.

== History ==
=== Background and foundation ===
The area of modern Niamey was of little importance before Niger's colonial era. As the Sahelian kingdoms fought for control over the Sahel, the Niamey area was a buffer zone that was not urbanised. Late-sixteenth-century residents of this area included the Zarma and other Songhai refugees from the Moroccan invasion of the Songhai Empire, Hausa-speaking Maouri hunters who migrated westward from the Dogondoutchi area, and the regionally dominant Fula people. These ethnic groups comprise the population of modern Niamey.

The villages of Goudel and Gamkalé were founded on the left bank (east side) of the Niger River in the sixteenth century. The site that would become Niamey was situated between these villages, around the gully of Gounti Yéna. Various other villages sprouted here around the early nineteenth century; the Hausa village of Maourey, the Zarma village of Kalley, and the Songhai village of Gaweye were on the left bank, while the Fula villages of Lamordé, Nogaré, and Kirkissoye were on the right bank.

Oral histories differ on the chronology of Niamey's early settlement and the etymology of its name. The Maouri believe that the city's Maouri founders were driven away from the nearby river island of Néni Goungou by the Fula villagers of Bitinkodji; they say the city was built next to a landmark tree called Gna (Note: Also written as niami) and was thus named "place of the Gna", or Gna-mé. The Zarma believe that the founder, a Kallé Zarma chief from the Zarmaganda region named Kouri Mali, acquired land between Yantala and Gamkalé Sebangayé; they say the city's name is derived from his exclamation of "wa gnam ne", meaning "clear out here" or "settle here". The Songhai believe that the founders were two fishermen from Gao, who were gifted the river island of Yama Gungu by the local Fula herders before settling on the left bank.

=== Colonial era ===
==== French invasion and military rule ====
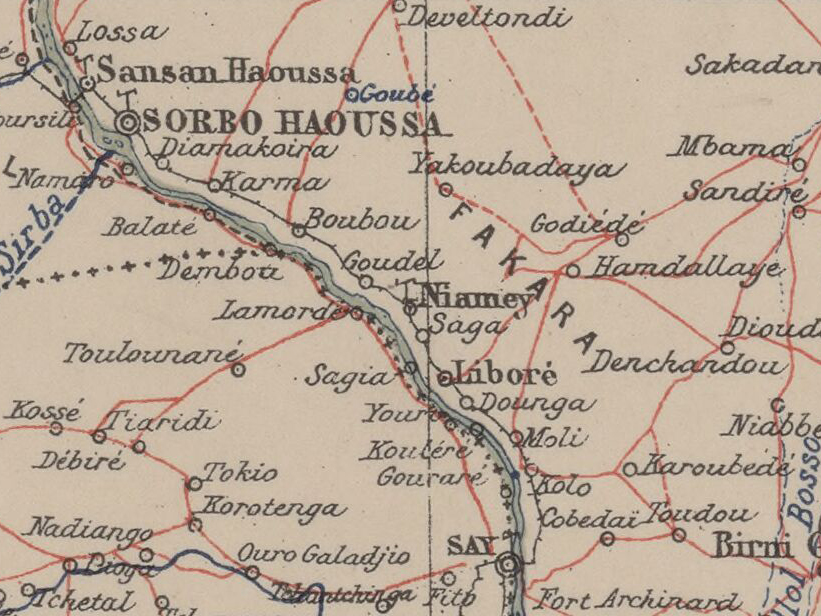
1903 French map showing Niamey and nearby settlements

By the time of the Scramble for Africa, when France laid claim to Niger, western Niger had been weakened by local conflicts and had no major political powers. This facilitated the French invasion of Niger, which began in 1891. The first European mentions of Niamey were by the 1897 mission of Émile Auguste Léon Hourst, then the 1899 Voulet–Chanoine Mission, which set fire to Niamey. A local account mentioned earlier contact with Europeans, identified as the expedition of Georges Joseph Toutée.

The first French post in Niamey was established in 1901 by Henri Salaman, a captain overseeing the Niger–Chad road. The administration chose the location—above a river bend—to provide a port between Zinder and Timbuktu and to facilitate securing control over the inland part of the territory. Salaman was the first to refer to the whole cluster of villages as Niamey. Niamey's residents viewed him as a bringer of peace and development, and the city became known in Hausa as "garin captin Salma", meaning "Captain Salaman's city". French settlement of Niamey began on an empty plateau on the left bank (the modern-day quartier of Terminus). Salaman's administration led construction in this area and drew in migrants through incentives, which included suspending taxation and forced labour for residents.

Niamey replaced Zinder as the capital of Niger in 1903, after a Tuareg revolt had weakened the eastern part of the territory. The French government incorporated several former chiefdoms into the Canton of Niamey. The first chief, a commoner named Bagniou, was unpopular as he had been a guide for the Voulet–Chanoine Mission, and the chiefdom of Karma protested losing autonomy to the new canton; it was replaced by the Canton of Karma in 1908. Niamey had about 1,800 inhabitants in 1904, when it became the capital of the Third Military Territory of Niger. The first city limits were then drawn. Niamey was not yet a focus of development as the capital's location was intended to be temporary, and officials debated whether the capital should be Niamey or Zinder. The capital moved back to Zinder in 1911, after violence in the eastern region had subsided and reorganisation had drawn Niamey further away from the center of the territory. From that year, Niamey's population began to decline from a peak of 3,000.

==== Colony of Niger ====
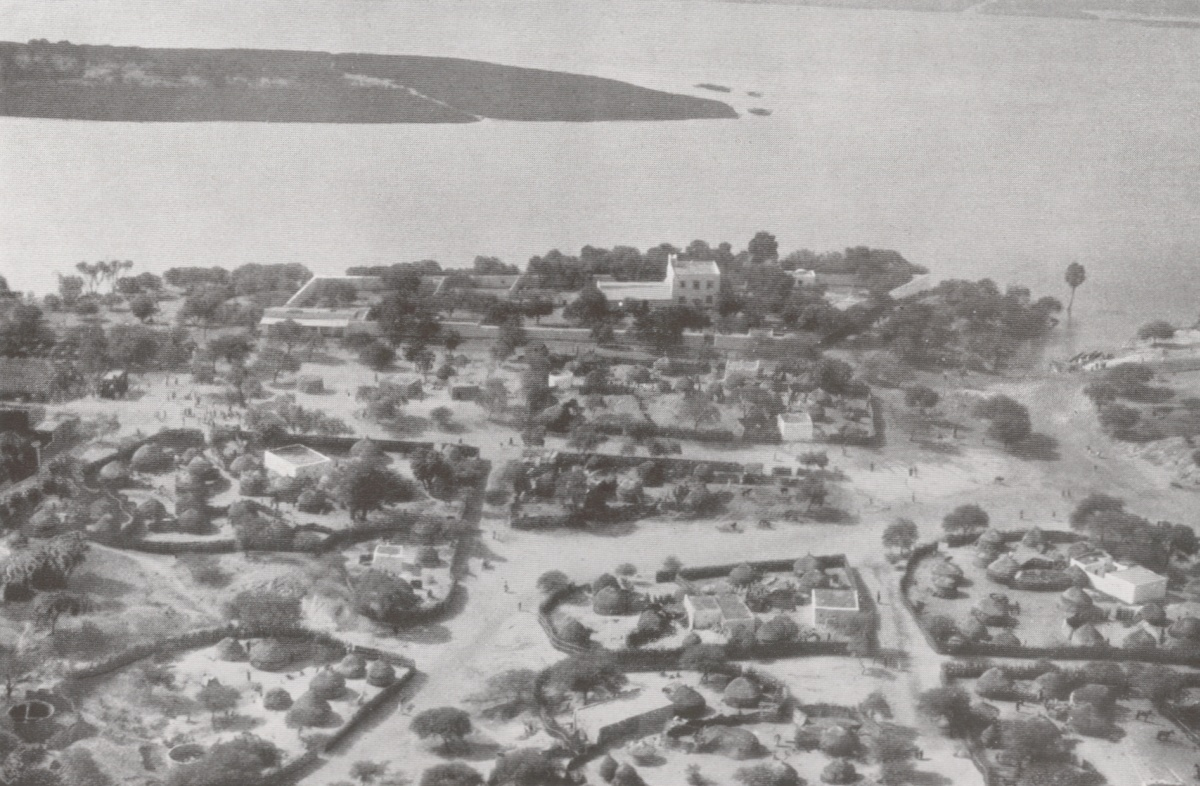
Niamey in December 1930. The large house in the centre is the French governor's residence. Air photo taken by Swiss pilot and photographer Walter Mittelholzer.

The Colony of Niger was founded in 1922. Zinder's proximity to the Nigerian border and its distance from French-controlled ports prompted the French to move the capital back to Niamey. Although Niamey was isolated from most of the colony, it was near French Dahomey. The official reason for the move was that Zinder had insufficient potable water. Other reasons included the resistance of Zinder's unified Hausa population to French rule, Niamey's more comfortable climate, and its river location, which officials believed was the only place suitable for agriculture. The governor of Niger, Jules Brévié, made Niamey the capital on 28 December 1926, by which time the city had 3,142 inhabitants. Construction of the new capital—including the governor's palace—began the year prior, mostly using forced labour.

In the decades following Niamey's establishment as the capital, the government developed agriculture and trade routes in western Niger, largely ignoring the rest of the territory. The government planned to extend Dahomey's rail network to link Parakou to Niamey, but this project was not completed. As capital, Niamey also became the center for the educated class of mostly Songhai and Zarma people, with the first regional school opening in 1930. Niamey's first city plan in 1930 designated an indigenous quarter near the river and a European quarter further inland, separated by a park used as a zone sanitaire (isolation zone). Government construction, including the completion of the governor's palace, took place in late 1930 and early 1931 using forced labour.

Before the 1930s, most migrants to Niamey were from western Niger. Low rainfall in 1930 caused a famine that brought internally displaced people to Niamey starting in May 1931. These migrants increased the city's population tenfold, but most left after the famine ended. Those who remained established informal settlements with mostly thatched mud buildings on the edge of the indigenous quarter. The growth led colonial administrators to increase policing of hygiene. Urban planning in the 1930s introduced health initiatives that involved the relocation of existing neighbourhoods, except for Gaweye, to the plateau. Most residents wished to stay on the river bank, but, after a 1935 fire destroyed many straw buildings, they were forcibly moved to mudbrick houses, resulting in multiethnic neighbourhoods. An urban plan implemented in 1937 divided Niamey into the European city, the indigenous city, and a commercial and industrial zone by the river.

Most of the urban plan was cancelled during the Second World War, when colonial officials left for the war and the administration prioritised commercial farming over infrastructure. As the city's population increased—from 5,000 in 1941 to 7,500 in 1945—the remaining colonial administrators were unable to enforce property ownership laws, resulting in many people acquiring land from indigenous chiefs. In the 1940s, the administration used taxation and forced labour to disincentivise immigration to the city. This labour was used for public works such as a central hospital and maternity ward. Forced labour was permitted under the indigénat until its abolishment in 1946, after which rural immigration increased. The same year, Niger gained autonomy as an overseas territory, leading to the formation of political parties in Niamey. The French government reorganised Niamey in response to political unrest, and Gamkalé and Yantala were incorporated into the city.

A new urban plan in 1952, the Plan Herbé (lit. 'Grassy Plan'), divided the city into several zones. The indigenous side included dense city blocks, while the European side was more open and green. This plan also formalised a marketplace of land plots, replacing traditional ownership. Niamey was the first settlement in Niger to become an urban centre, doubling in size between 1945 and 1955 to about 15,000 people. The Plan Herbé became outdated amid rapid urban growth and a wave of migrants from a 1954 famine. The city grew inward into the zone sanitaire, eliminating the distinction between the European and indigenous cities by 1955.

Niamey was named as a commune mixte, with a partially elected council, on 14 February 1954. It was upgraded to Niger's only commune de plein exercice on 18 December 1955, leading to municipal elections on 18 November 1956, the first in the country. The newly formed Mouvement Socialiste Africain coalition (later renamed Sawaba) won a majority in these elections. Djibo Bakary—the leader of a popular trade union in Niamey—thus became the first mayor. Boubou Hama was his deputy mayor. As mayor, Bakary campaigned in support of immediate independence in the 1958 referendum and unsuccessfully ran for Niamey's seat in the 1958 Nigerien Territorial Assembly election.

=== Post-independence era ===
==== Independence, economic growth, and population boom ====
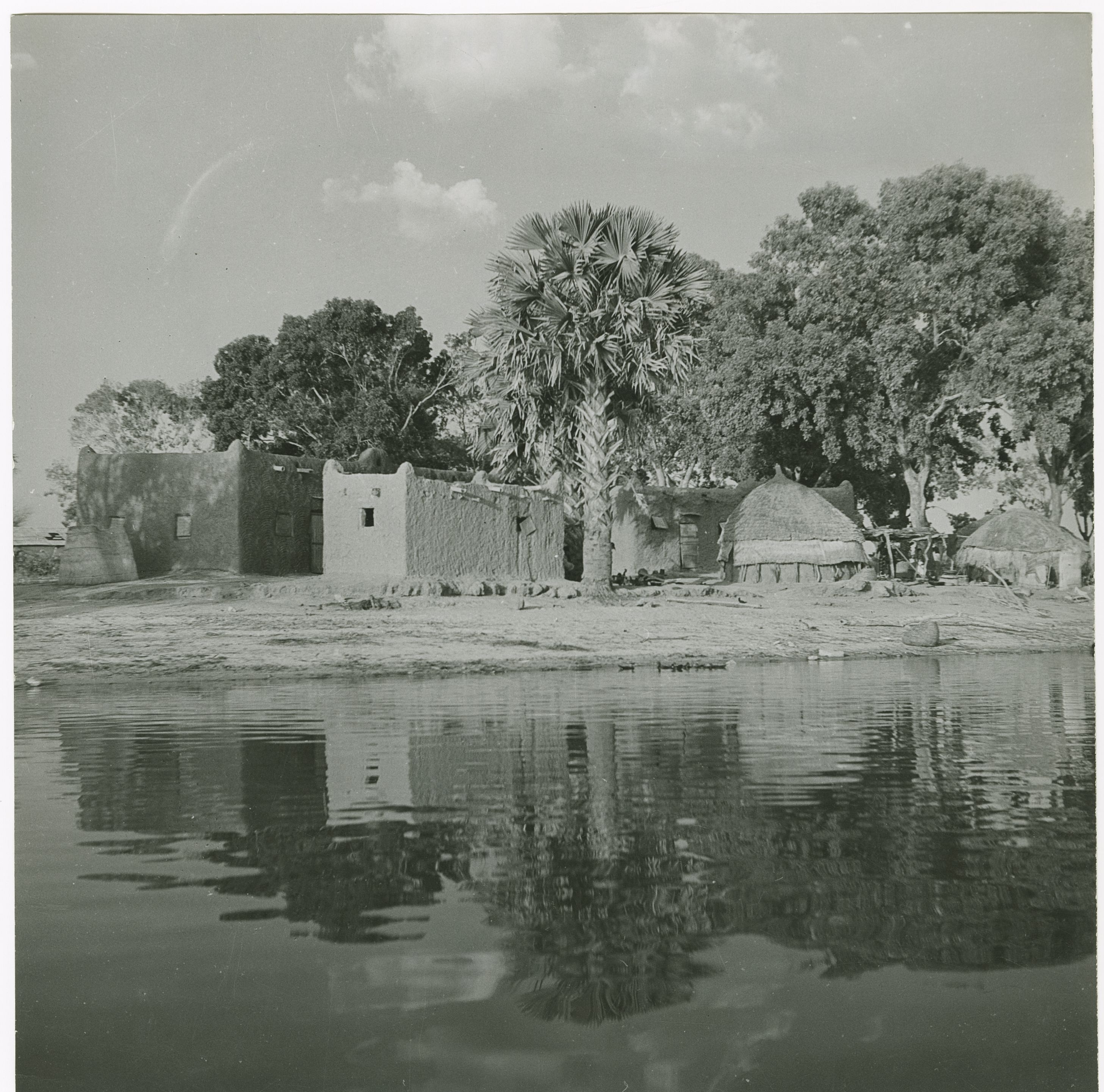
Niamey riverfront in 1961

By 1960, the year of Niger's independence, Niamey's population had grown to 33,816. A new city plan was drafted in 1961 by the French firm Kalt, Pourdaier-Duteil, and Raymond, which zoned the former indigenous quarter for a higher density than the former European quarter. Niamey received the country's only asphalt highway, spanning a few kilometres between Diori Hamani International Airport and the Presidential Palace—the former governor's palace. The French military base in the city was transferred to the Niger Armed Forces in 1961, becoming the 1re Compagnie de commandement, d'appui et de service (1re CCAS; transl. 1st Company of Command, Support, and Service), but Niamey's gendarmerie unit remained under French control. The 1re CCAS led a rebellion against the French units in the city on 3 December 1963.

Public-sector employees in Niamey comprised a large part of Niger's workforce in the mid-1960s, and the proportion grew to 14% by 1980. The government of Hamani Diori aimed to increase the country's industrial activities; Niamey received a textile production facility and a refrigerated slaughterhouse. Niamey's groundnut industry rapidly grew around this time, which contributed to increasing the capital's population to 108,000 in 1972. Diori's government established a party militia in 1964, stationing personnel in each of the city's seventeen quartiers. An urban plan in the 1960s (Note: The plan was enacted in 1964 or 1966.) introduced developments including a greenbelt. The plan ended the distinction between European and indigenous neighbourhoods, aiming to lower the disparity within the city's population density. Despite this, housing insecurity increased, and the informal settlement of Talladjé was created in 1966. Diori led the inaugural summit of the Organisation de la Francophonie in 1969 in Niamey, giving the city unprecedented media coverage, after which Diori launched a rebranding campaign for the city, which included naming of streets. The Kennedy Bridge opened in 1970 and connected the left bank of Niamey to the much less populated right bank, which then began to urbanise.

A national uranium boom in the 1970s and 1980s improved the economy of Niamey. The city's public spending was then invested in modern buildings, resulting in an era of opulent architecture in a revival of the Sudanese style. The economic situation caused a baby boom. Meanwhile, a drought in 1972–73 brought a wave of migrants that led to rapid urban sprawl, and Malian immigrants settled in the outer parts of the city. As a result, the population of Niamey grew from 108,000 to 398,365 inhabitants, and the city limits expanded from 1,367 ha (3,380 acres) in 1970 to 4,400 ha (11,000 acres) by 1977, annexing peripheral villages.

After the military government of Seyni Kountché took power in the 1974 coup, there were strict controls on residency and the government would regularly round up and deport those without permits back to their villages. The government established a daily curfew and placed 10,000 political agents in the city, which had a population of 400,000. A second drought occurred in 1983–84, bringing about 150,000 migrants to Niamey. Kountché's government responded to the ensuing housing crisis with eviction and resettlement to new districts including Lazaret and Madina, but the crisis continued. Kountché's government also constructed water sources in the city's periphery and led the construction of the Grand Mosque of Niamey, funded by the Libyan government. In 1984, the Schéma Directeur d'Aménagement et d'Urbanisme (transl. Master Plan for Urban Planning and Development) divided Niamey into five districts, subordinate to the Prefect Mayor, to manage the large population. These were reorganised into the Niamey Urban Community (Communauté Urbaine de Niamey, CUN), with three municipalities, in 1989. In the 1990s, with further reorganisation and decentralisation, the city's growth rate slightly declined.

==== Democratisation era and urban reorganisation ====
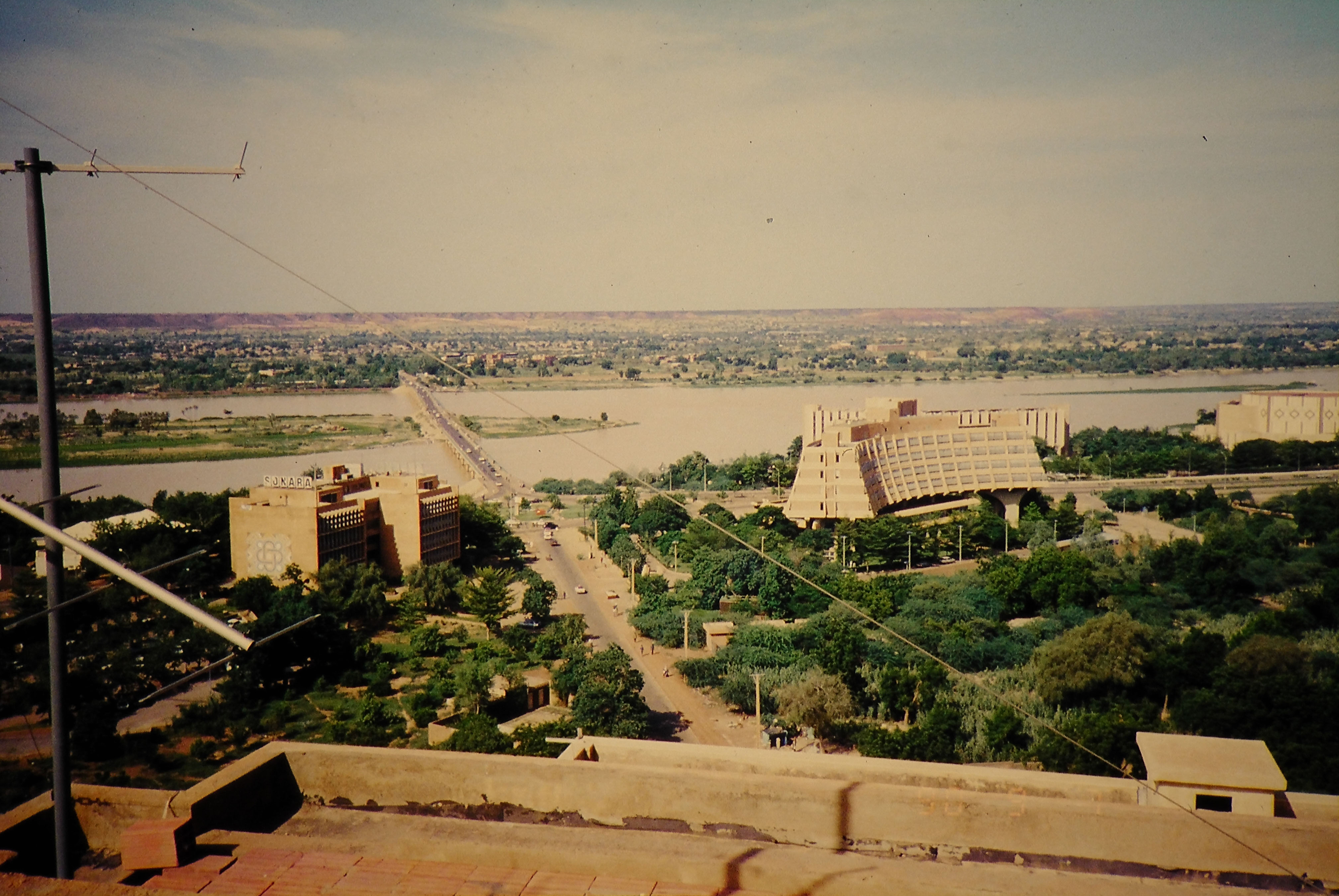
View from the left bank overlooking the Kennedy Bridge in 1990

In the 1990 Kennedy Bridge massacre, soldiers killed three student protestors. This event propelled protests and political participation in support of democracy. That November, 100,000 people in Niamey participated in a general strike against president Ali Saibou, after which he agreed to establish a democratic council. In 1993, the year Mahamane Ousmane became the first democratically elected president, Niamey had high rates of poverty and unemployment as public-sector jobs decreased. Niger's democratisation effected an upsurge in the popularity of private radio and in Islamic discourse. Islamic groups based in Niamey, including Izala Society supporters, played major roles in protests against the Ousmane government's proposed family law in 1994 and against the city's hosting of the International Festival of African Fashion in 2000. A coup d'état organised in Niamey in February 1996 installed Ibrahim Baré Maïnassara as president. Baré was unpopular in Niamey as public-sector employment decreased and state-run urban services declined. On 9 April 1999, Baré was ambushed, shot, and killed at Niamey's airport during a coup d'état.

The CUN was reorganised in 1996 amid a wide reorganisation of the country's municipalities. The CUN became a first-level region of Niger and was divided into five municipalities. The plan allowed the region to shrink to centralise the area managed, but a 2002 plan instead allowed each municipality to expand within a perimeter to benefit from urban growth. This plan redrew municipalities' boundaries based on pre-colonial settlements, with consulting from traditional chiefs. Administrative decentralisation in 2004 gave these municipalities control over zoning, leading to a dispute with the CUN. Residents of the village of Saga disagreed with being incorporated into the CUN. In 2011, the municipalities were reorganised as municipal districts, undoing the decentralisation.

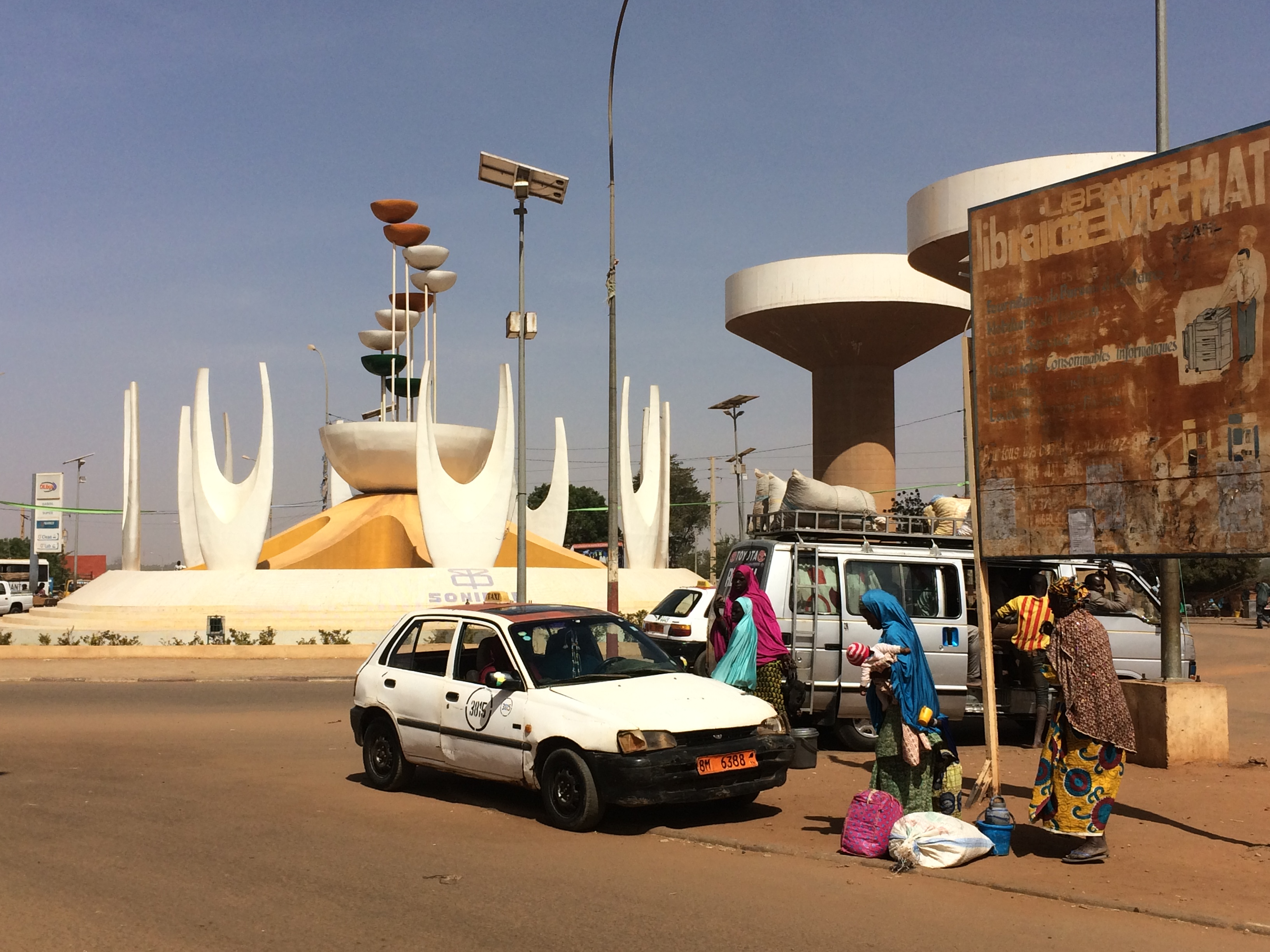
Place du Liptako-Gourma in 2018

Urban development projects in the 2010s involved the expropriation and destruction of neighbourhoods. These projects included president Mahamadou Issoufou's Niamey Nyala initiative, launched in 2011, and preparation for the city's hosting of an African Union summit in 2019. In 2013, American and French military bases were established at adjacent parts of Diori Hamani International Airport. Niamey was the site of protests against the 2021 presidential election and president-elect Mohamed Bazoum; most Niameyans believed he had stolen the election as the city had overwhelmingly voted for Ousmane. Air force units in the city led a failed coup against Bazoum before his inauguration. In July 2023, the Niger junta began renaming street names from the colonial era to more local names, such as replacing the name of Charles de Gaulle with that of Bakary. In April 2024, the junta's leader, Abdourahamane Tiani, declared the dissolution of local governments, replacing the mayor of Niamey, Oumarou Dogari, with an army official. The same month, hundreds rallied in Niamey to demand the withdrawal of the US military from the country. The US withdrew its troops from Niamey in July 2024. In August 2026, Niamey became the site of an unsuccessful coup attempt against Tiani when mutinous soldiers within the Nigerien Army attacked government forces near the Presidential Palace and headquarters of the Office of Radio and Television of Niger.

== Geography ==
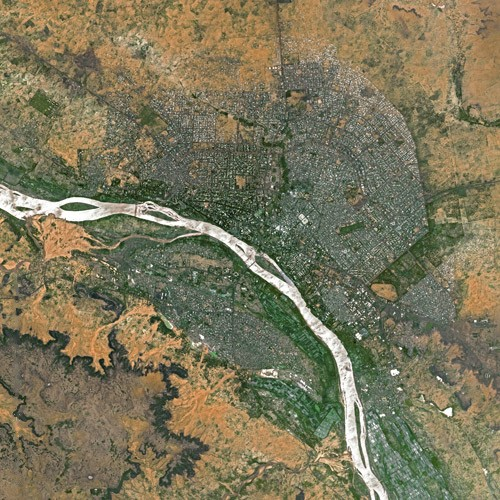
Niamey seen from Spot Satellite

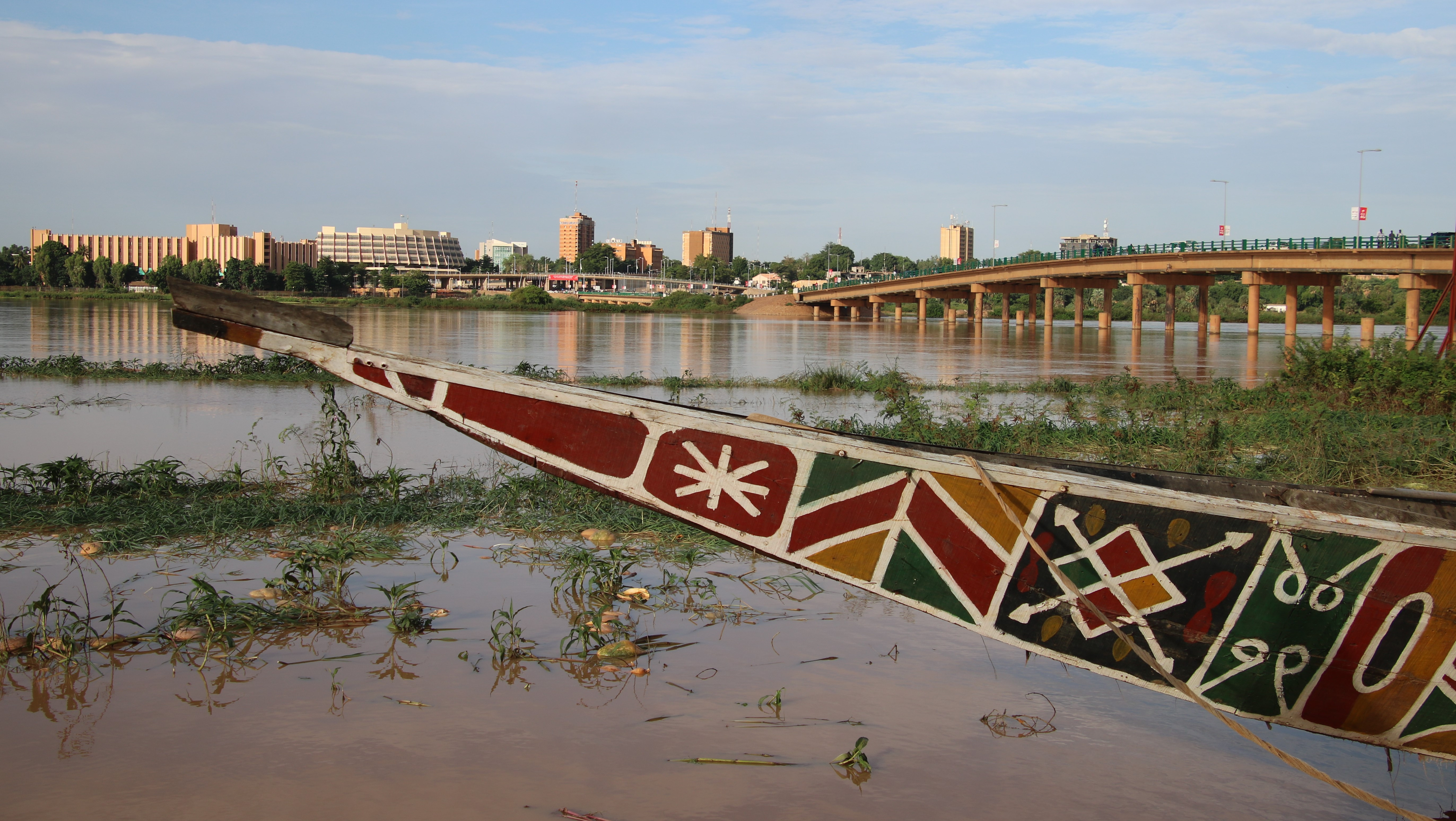
The Niger River, with Kennedy Bridge on the right

Niamey is in the western part of Niger, surrounded by the Tillabéri Region. Located between the longitudes 2°03' E and 2°15' E and the latitudes 13°35' N and 13°24' N, it covers an area of 552.27 km^{2} (213.23 sq mi), of which 297.46 km^{2} (114.85 sq mi) is urban, as of 2022. It is located on the Niger River, mostly on the plateau of the left bank (east side), with a few developments on the alluvial plain of the right bank. The city's height above sea level mostly ranges from 190 m to 230 m on the left bank and from 180 m to 185 m on the right bank; the highest point, Trois Sœurs, reaches 250 m.

The Niger is Niamey's only permanent river. Koris (wadis) form temporarily, mostly on the left bank, and have become more common since the 1970s due to human activity. The river is fed by koris in the Inner Niger Delta, with the flow in the city mainly coming from three koris on the right bank: Gorouol, Dargol, and Sirba. The plateau of Niamey pushes the river's flow to be straight. Niamey is downriver from the Sélingué Dam in Mali, which has regulated the river's water level and prevented the city from losing water during droughts. A series of sandy islands lies from Niamey upstream to Karma; the largest are Boubon, Kanazi, and Néni Goungou. As koris form alluvial fans, the river is prone to flooding. Erosion and sedimentary deposits cause high siltation of the river, preventing it from flowing during periods of dryness, which threatens agriculture in Niamey.

Niamey is between the geological regions of Liptako on the west and the Iullemmeden Basin on the east. It sits atop plateaus of sand and laterite, which are extracted by the city's quarries. The city centre is built on bedrock formed by the West African Craton on the east bank, while the porous sediment of the Iullemmeden lies on both banks.

Niamey's vegetation consists of tiger bush shrubland on the plateau and millet fields and savanna in the valleys. Some trees are planted by government projects; a greenbelt was created in the 1960s, and areas in the city centre were planted in the mid-1970s by the Kountché administration. The greenbelt covers 2,500 ha (6,200 acres) of the peri-urban area, though most of its original space is no longer forested, and nine other green spaces each cover 42 ha (100 acres). Most trees in the city are maintained by residents, who use them for shade (which provides space for outdoor events) and for fruit. Common trees planted by residents include neem, mango, and étagère. Most of the city's tree coverage is of introduced species; some were introduced during the colonial era, and others, including neem, were planted for the greenbelt. The predominant natural trees are Combretaceae, including the species Acacia albida, which is maintained for soil regeneration. Urban gardens take up 54 ha (130 acres), as of 2007. The city's woodland and shrubland coverage decreased from 35% in 1968 to 7% in 2009, despite a stagnant area of agricultural land.

=== Cityscape ===
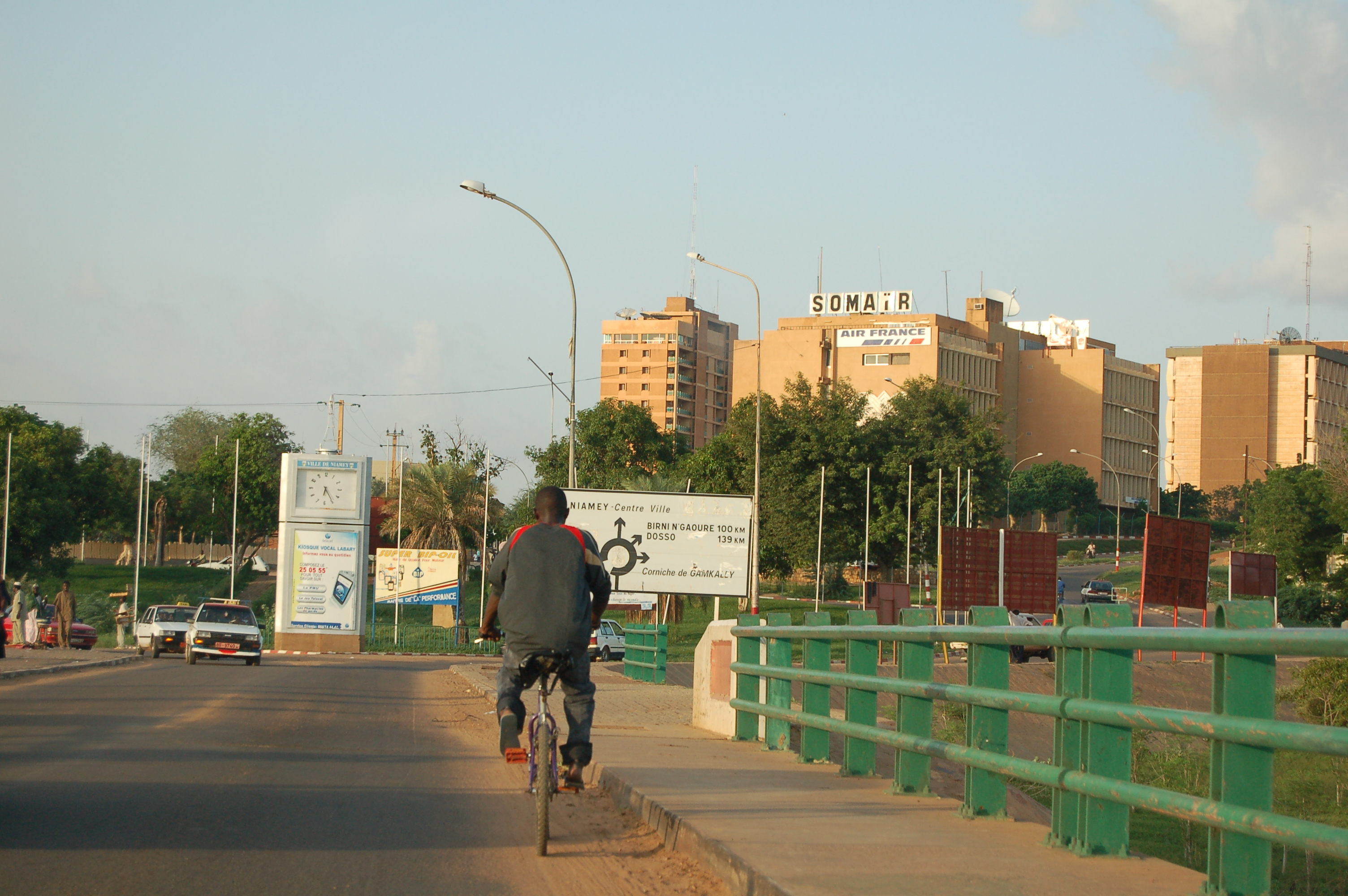
Multi-storey buildings seen from Kennedy Bridge

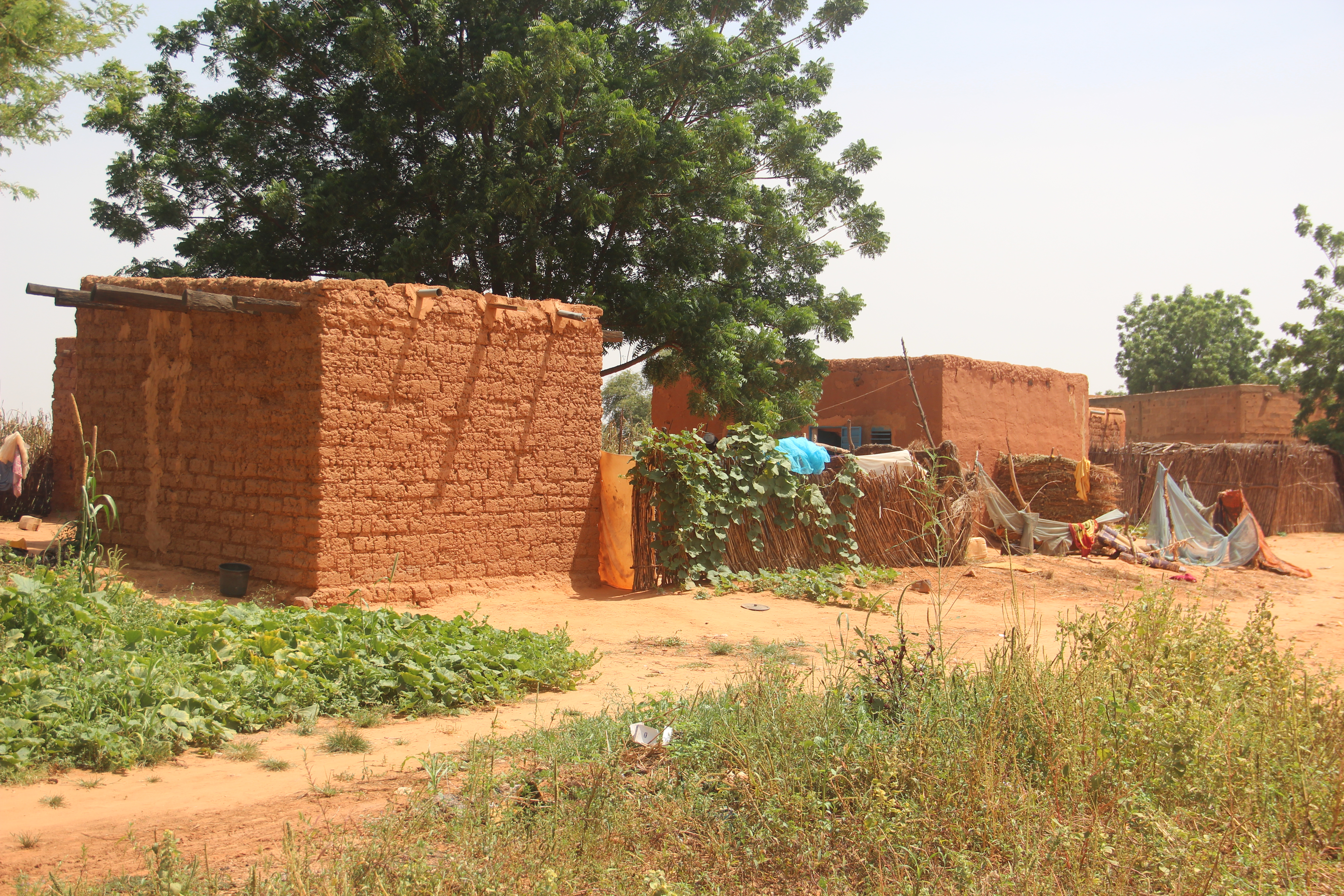
Mudbrick houses in Saga

The density of Niamey decreases with distance from the built-up city centre, with some rural settlements within and surrounding the locality. The Niamey Urban Community incorporates several surrounding towns and villages that have been annexed. Niamey's grid plan includes wide boulevards linking roundabouts, alongside dirt roads in residential areas.

Houses in Niamey have building materials associated with their inhabitants' social strata, ranging from huts to European-style villas. Most houses are fenced. Mudbrick is popular as an inexpensive, local construction method, having replaced lighter materials as the colonial city was established. In the post-independence era, more expensive, imported materials such as cement and reinforced concrete became more popular. Urban planning authorities favour cement over mudbrick, which is associated with poverty. The vast majority of the population in the 2000s lived in mudbrick buildings. Many neighbourhoods, both formal and informal, have dense populations who rent multifamily compounds made of mudbrick with shared courtyards. Most of these compounds are not connected to the electricity grid or running water.

Municipally allocated land lots typically measure 300 to 400 square metres. Much of Niamey's urban expansion involves informal neighbourhoods, or quartier non-loti, (Note: Quartier non-loti, literally "non-zoned quarter", is a Francophone West African term for neighbourhoods that lack official zoning or subdivision.) which are constructed by their residents without administrative approval and are allocated and zoned by traditional chiefs (See § Governance and politics). This kind of settlement became popular during the 1970s housing crisis and proliferated during the 1990s economic decline. Government zoning and public housing projects often focus on middle-class residents, motivating lower-class residents to live in informal settlements. Though Niger recognises traditional ownership, the parallel land market violates the city code, so these neighbourhoods have ambiguous government approval. The government variably rebuilds such neighbourhoods or destroys them for new development.

Niamey is a polycentric city. The city centre has poor, dense neighbourhoods that have existed since the 1930s and 1940s. Some were replaced by business districts with multi-story buildings in the 2010s. Such developments have caused poor residents of the area to sell their homes or be pressured to leave by gentrification projects. The northernmost part of Niamey contains the poor neighbourhood of Koira Tégui, which was relocated from the city centre in 1989. The city's eastern periphery is centered around the industrial zone, military barracks, commercial establishments, and Diori Hamani International Airport. On the opposite side of the industrial zone is the village of Saga, 5 km from downtown Niamey, which has become a peri-urban area due to nearby developments. The city's largest informal neighbourhood, Pays Bas, is built on a ravine near the airport, allocated by Saga's chief; informal settlements expand eastward to the neighbourhood of Tondigamay, built on existing roads. In the west of the city, Commune I is the wealthiest part of Niamey, with many foreign embassy workers. The right bank of Niamey contains traditional Fula villages, as well as neighbourhoods that arose after the construction of Kennedy Bridge (such as Karadjé and Banga Bana) and relocated neighbourhoods such as Gaweye. The right bank also contains higher education institutions including Abdou Moumouni University.

=== Climate ===
Niamey, Niger

Climate chart (precipitation, max. and min. temperature)
J	F	M	A	M	J	J	A	S	O	N	D
0 32 17	0.3 36 20	0.2 40 24	9.8 42 28	25 41 28	79 38 27	146 35 24	193 33 23	85 35 24	17 38 25	0 37 21	0 34 17
- █ Average max. and min. temperatures in °C
- █ Precipitation totals in mm
- Source: NOAA NCEI / World Meteorological Organization (1991–2020 WMO Region I Africa Normals)
Imperial conversion
J	F	M	A	M	J	J	A	S	O	N	D
0 90 62	0 96 68	0 103 76	0.4 107 82	1 105 83	3.1 100 80	5.7 94 76	7.6 91 74	3.4 95 76	0.7 100 77	0 99 70	0 92 63
- █ Average max. and min. temperatures in °F
- █ Precipitation totals in inches

Lying in the core of the Sahel, Niamey has a hot semi-arid climate (Köppen BSh). With monthly highs ranging from 32 °C (89.6 °F) in January to 41 °C (105.8 °F) in April, Niamey is one of the hottest parts of Niger or the Sahel, and indeed one of the world's hottest major cities. With an expected rainfall of 500 to 750 millimetres or 20 to 30 inches annually, it is drier than areas further west in West Africa. Rainfall mostly begins with a few storms in May, then transitions to a rainy season from early June to early September, and there is practically no rain from October to April. The dry season is divided into a cool dry season from November to February and a hot dry season from March to May.

Niamey has a pattern of two floods. The first, termed the "local flood" or "red flood", (Note: The term "red flood" refers to the color of the sediment carried by the flood, containing iron oxide.) is derived from heavy monsoonal rains falling in the catchment areas of right-bank Niger tributaries upstream from the city, usually from August to October. A smaller flood, called the "Guinean flood", is caused by rainfall that flows from Guinea's Fouta Djallon region via the Inner Niger Delta in Mali, usually from January to March. The region around Niamey has seen increases in surface water levels following decreases in rainfall—a phenomenon known as the Niamey paradox—which has caused decreased durations of the two floods. The river's flow has increased since the 1970s, which led to the distinguishment of the two floods, with the red flood shifting ahead by 40 days. The two-flood cycle causes significant flooding events, exacerbated by inadequate drainage systems, and damage is intensified when the floods overlap. In the 2000s and 2010s, the red flood increased in strength due to increased runoff, causing extreme floods in 2010, 2012, and 2013. (Note: These three floods were the most intense since records began in the 1920s.) Rainfall across the city is uneven. The city is affected by droughts, especially the northern, central, and southwestern parts. The driest years on record are 1972, 1982, and 1984.

Leading up to the rainy season, Niamey is dry with low cloud cover, leading to significant diurnal temperature variation. In June, the temperature rises quickly in the morning and slows down by the afternoon; in August, there is a slower temperature rise in the morning and a slight decrease in the afternoon. Temperatures in the hot dry season regularly exceed 40 °C or 104 °F and may come near the unsafe threshold of 45 °C or 113 °F. In the cool dry season, average nighttime lows range from 14 to 18 °C (57.2 to 64.4 °F). Climate change led to a 1.4 °C or 2.5 °F increase in annual minimum temperatures between 1965 and 2013. Winds of the African easterly jet (AEJ) contribute to the convective boundary layer in Niamey, whose depth is about 1,000 to 2,000 metres or 0.6 to 1.2 miles (Note: With a pressure of 850 hPa) during the rainy season and 2,000 to 3,000 metres or 1.2 to 1.9 miles (Note: 750 hPa) leading up to the rainy season. Air masses caused by small-scale burning in Niamey have been observed. Land clearing in the area has led to erosion, forming koris and alluvial cones. The city's heat leads to a high risk of malaria near water pools, while dust storms contribute to meningitis.

Climate data for Niamey Airport (1991–2020, extremes 1961–present)
Month	Jan	Feb	Mar	Apr	May	Jun	Jul	Aug	Sep	Oct	Nov	Dec	Year
Record high °C (°F)	40.7 (105.3)	44.0 (111.2)	45.0 (113.0)	46.1 (115.0)	47.0 (116.6)	44.4 (111.9)	41.0 (105.8)	39.6 (103.3)	41.8 (107.2)	41.6 (106.9)	41.8 (107.2)	40.0 (104.0)	47.0 (116.6)
Mean maximum °C (°F)	36.8 (98.2)	40.1 (104.2)	42.7 (108.9)	44.3 (111.7)	44.1 (111.4)	42.1 (107.8)	38.9 (102.0)	36.8 (98.2)	39.1 (102.4)	40.4 (104.7)	39.4 (102.9)	37.3 (99.1)	45.1 (113.2)
Mean daily maximum °C (°F)	32.4 (90.3)	35.8 (96.4)	39.5 (103.1)	41.6 (106.9)	40.7 (105.3)	37.9 (100.2)	34.6 (94.3)	32.8 (91.0)	34.9 (94.8)	38.0 (100.4)	37.1 (98.8)	33.6 (92.5)	36.6 (97.9)
Daily mean °C (°F)	24.6 (76.3)	27.8 (82.0)	31.9 (89.4)	34.7 (94.5)	34.5 (94.1)	32.2 (90.0)	29.5 (85.1)	28.1 (82.6)	29.6 (85.3)	31.5 (88.7)	29.0 (84.2)	25.5 (77.9)	29.9 (85.8)
Mean daily minimum °C (°F)	16.9 (62.4)	19.8 (67.6)	24.3 (75.7)	27.8 (82.0)	28.3 (82.9)	26.6 (79.9)	24.4 (75.9)	23.4 (74.1)	24.2 (75.6)	25.1 (77.2)	21.0 (69.8)	17.4 (63.3)	23.3 (73.9)
Mean minimum °C (°F)	13.5 (56.3)	15.9 (60.6)	19.5 (67.1)	23.0 (73.4)	23.1 (73.6)	20.7 (69.3)	20.3 (68.5)	20.4 (68.7)	20.7 (69.3)	21.1 (70.0)	17.3 (63.1)	13.9 (57.0)	12.8 (55.0)
Record low °C (°F)	8.3 (46.9)	10.4 (50.7)	16.0 (60.8)	19.9 (67.8)	20.2 (68.4)	19.8 (67.6)	19.4 (66.9)	19.4 (66.9)	19.5 (67.1)	18.0 (64.4)	13.4 (56.1)	11.6 (52.9)	8.3 (46.9)
Average rainfall mm (inches)	0.0 (0.0)	0.3 (0.01)	0.2 (0.01)	9.8 (0.39)	25.3 (1.00)	78.6 (3.09)	145.6 (5.73)	192.6 (7.58)	85.1 (3.35)	16.7 (0.66)	0.0 (0.0)	0.0 (0.0)	554.2 (21.82)
Average rainy days (≥ 1.0 mm)	0.0	0.0	0.1	1.0	2.7	6.0	9.7	12.1	6.8	1.7	0.0	0.0	40.1
Average relative humidity (%)	22	17	18	27	42	55	67	74	73	53	34	27	42
Mean monthly sunshine hours	285.0	259.1	263.3	256.8	266.8	247.4	245.1	226.2	250.1	286.1	293.8	299.4	3,179.1
Source 1: NOAA NCEI / World Meteorological Organization (1991–2020 WMO Region I Africa Normals)
Source 2: Deutscher Wetterdienst (humidity 1961–1990)

Climate data for Niamey Airport (1961–1990, extremes 1961–2015)
Month	Jan	Feb	Mar	Apr	May	Jun	Jul	Aug	Sep	Oct	Nov	Dec	Year
Record high °C (°F)	38.2 (100.8)	44.0 (111.2)	45.0 (113.0)	45.6 (114.1)	45.1 (113.2)	43.5 (110.3)	41.0 (105.8)	39.6 (103.3)	41.8 (107.2)	41.2 (106.2)	40.7 (105.3)	40.0 (104.0)	45.6 (114.1)
Mean daily maximum °C (°F)	32.5 (90.5)	35.7 (96.3)	39.1 (102.4)	40.9 (105.6)	40.2 (104.4)	37.2 (99.0)	34.0 (93.2)	33.0 (91.4)	34.4 (93.9)	37.8 (100.0)	36.2 (97.2)	33.3 (91.9)	36.2 (97.2)
Daily mean °C (°F)	24.3 (75.7)	27.3 (81.1)	30.9 (87.6)	33.8 (92.8)	34.0 (93.2)	31.5 (88.7)	29.0 (84.2)	27.9 (82.2)	29.0 (84.2)	30.8 (87.4)	27.9 (82.2)	25.0 (77.0)	29.3 (84.7)
Mean daily minimum °C (°F)	16.1 (61.0)	19.0 (66.2)	22.9 (73.2)	26.5 (79.7)	27.7 (81.9)	25.7 (78.3)	24.1 (75.4)	23.2 (73.8)	23.6 (74.5)	24.2 (75.6)	19.5 (67.1)	16.7 (62.1)	22.4 (72.4)
Record low °C (°F)	12.6 (54.7)	14.3 (57.7)	18.0 (64.4)	21.6 (70.9)	22.6 (72.7)	20.5 (68.9)	20.0 (68.0)	20.2 (68.4)	20.3 (68.5)	20.0 (68.0)	15.8 (60.4)	13.0 (55.4)	12.6 (54.7)
Average rainfall mm (inches)	0.0 (0.0)	0.0 (0.0)	3.9 (0.15)	5.7 (0.22)	34.7 (1.37)	68.8 (2.71)	154.3 (6.07)	170.8 (6.72)	92.2 (3.63)	9.7 (0.38)	0.7 (0.03)	0.0 (0.0)	540.8 (21.28)
Average rainy days (≥ 1.0 mm)	0.0	0.0	0.2	0.8	2.9	5.9	9.9	12.2	7.4	1.6	0.1	0.0	41.0
Average relative humidity (%)	22	17	18	27	42	55	67	74	73	53	34	27	42
Mean daily sunshine hours	9.1	9.4	8.7	8.4	9.0	8.9	8.3	7.6	8.4	9.2	9.4	9.0	8.8

== Demographics ==
Historical population
Year	Pop.	±%
1977	242,973	—
1988	397,437	+63.6%
2001	707,951	+78.1%
2012	1,026,848	+45.0%
Source: National Statistics Institute of Niger

Population pyramid (2022)
%	Males	Age	Females	%
0.106		80+		0.146
0.199		75–79		0.245
0.382		70–74		0.391
0.570		65–69		0.547
0.769		60–64		0.757
0.943		55–59		0.982
1.069		50–54		1.213
1.350		45–49		1.483
1.554		40–44		1.837
1.920		35–39		2.216
2.654		30–34		2.679
0.626		25–29		0.613
4.406		20–24		4.347
5.526		15–19		5.465
6.799		10–14		6.727
8.214		5–9		8.109
9.853		0–4		9.679

In 2022, Niamey had an estimated population of 1,407,635 (700,722 males and 706,913 females) and a population density of 2,549 per square kilometre. Niamey has a high population growth rate, correlated with the national rate, which is one of the highest in the world. Oxford Economics estimated that Niamey was the world's fastest growing city in 2015, predicting a growth rate of 5.2% each year until 2030. Niamey's population is largely young; its age distribution has a median of 14 years and a third quartile of 24 years, as of 2013.

Most people in Niamey work in the informal economy. The city has high wealth disparity, and neighbourhoods have strong class divisions. The average income is about 500 CFA francs (1 US dollar) per day, as of 2019. The living wage is about 100 US dollars per month, as of 2016. Since the 1990s, the city's cost of living has increased while employment has decreased. The number of government jobs has decreased amid neoliberal economic programs. People without formal education have few job opportunities. Job market saturation has made it difficult for young migrants to find employment.

Most residents of Niamey rent their homes and frequently move within the urban area based on finances. Some seasonal residents arrange to keep a property within a group of roommates. About 20% of households in the city have a woman as the head of household. The city has many nuclear households, but preference for a large family size is widespread, with an average of 4.2 children per woman in 2021. Expectations of marriage limit the social status of many young men in Niamey who cannot afford to marry.

Informal settlements and squatting are common throughout the city. It does not have extensive slums, although the United Nations definition of slums includes 80% of the city. The city centre has visible groups of beggars, particularly within the more trafficked neighbourhoods. Beggars have formed a well-regulated hierarchical system in which they garner money according to cultural perceptions that view groups such as disabled people as being worthy of begging.

=== Ethnicity and language ===
Niamey is a cosmopolitan, highly ethnically integrated city with residents from every ethnic group of Niger and others from across West Africa. According to anthropologist Scott M. Youngstedt, Hausa people have comprised over half of the city's population since about 1980, having increased from 12% in 1960. Despite this, the Hausa largely identify as a diaspora community within a Zarma city, which lies about 150 kilometres west of Hausaland. Members of the Bella caste of Tuareg people have assimilated into the Zarma and Songhai cultures in the area since coming to Saga from the village of Sona Bella in the late 19th century.

The Hausa and Zarma languages are Niamey's lingua francas. An overwhelming majority of the city speaks Hausa, including international immigrants. The variety of Hausa used in the city is influenced by Zarma grammar. Code switching between Hausa, Zarma, and French is common. Other languages used include Fula and Tamasheq.

=== Migration ===
Since Niamey's establishment as a city, the vast majority of its population has been migrants and their children. This is due to its political status as well as the effects of droughts and famines. The city's population increases by 200,000 or 300,000 during the dry season due to circular migration from rural Niger. During the dry season, many Hausa residents work in the city's informal economy. For rural Nigerien Hausas, Niamey is the most popular place to migrate due to its ease of travel. Many Hausa migrants stay in Niamey for a few years. Most do not consider it their home, but youths in the 21st century often feel stronger connections to the city. Those who stay in the city permanently are seen within the community as "left behind". Many such people prefer Niamey for its standard of living and lack of violence, despite difficulties with employment and affordability. Others cannot afford to return home.

Many Niamey residents desire to move out of the country, and social groups are formed with this goal. These groups often fund emigrations to receive remittances in return. It is common for international emigrants to return to the city after long periods. Hausa migrants to Niamey often emigrate internationally, comprising a large part of the international Hausa diaspora. Hausa migrants within Niger are composed about equally of men and women, but, as men emigrate internationally, women typically stay in Niamey, often with their in-laws. Some Niameyans are educated in Western cities such as Paris, Hamburg, New York City, and Greensboro, the latter being nicknamed Little Niamey.

The foreign-born population of Niger is mostly centered in Niamey and Tillabéri. Nigerian Yoruba businesspeople come to Niamey because it has less competition than other cities in Niger. Yoruba people first came to Niamey in the 1950s, immigrating from Shaki and Igboho. They comprised 2.4% of the city in 1961 (Note: As estimated by Suzanne Bernus) before large-scale immigration began in the 1970s. Niamey has had waves of Tuareg refugees from northern Mali since the 1960s, caused by war or drought. The city has about 4,000 such people, as of 2022, and they formed an advocacy group in 2012. Many upper-caste Tuaregs experience lower social status in Niamey than in Mali. Many Tuareg migrants work as brickmakers or water vendors (see § Water). Niamey has Niger's largest Chinese population, composed of mostly short-term residents. The city's first Chinese women came in the 1980s with their Nigerien husbands, who they met at universities in Guangzhou. Some Chinese women are employed by the public sector or by Chinese corporations; they come from cities or provinces that have relations with Niger. Others, largely from southern China, establish businesses.

=== Religion ===
==== Islam ====
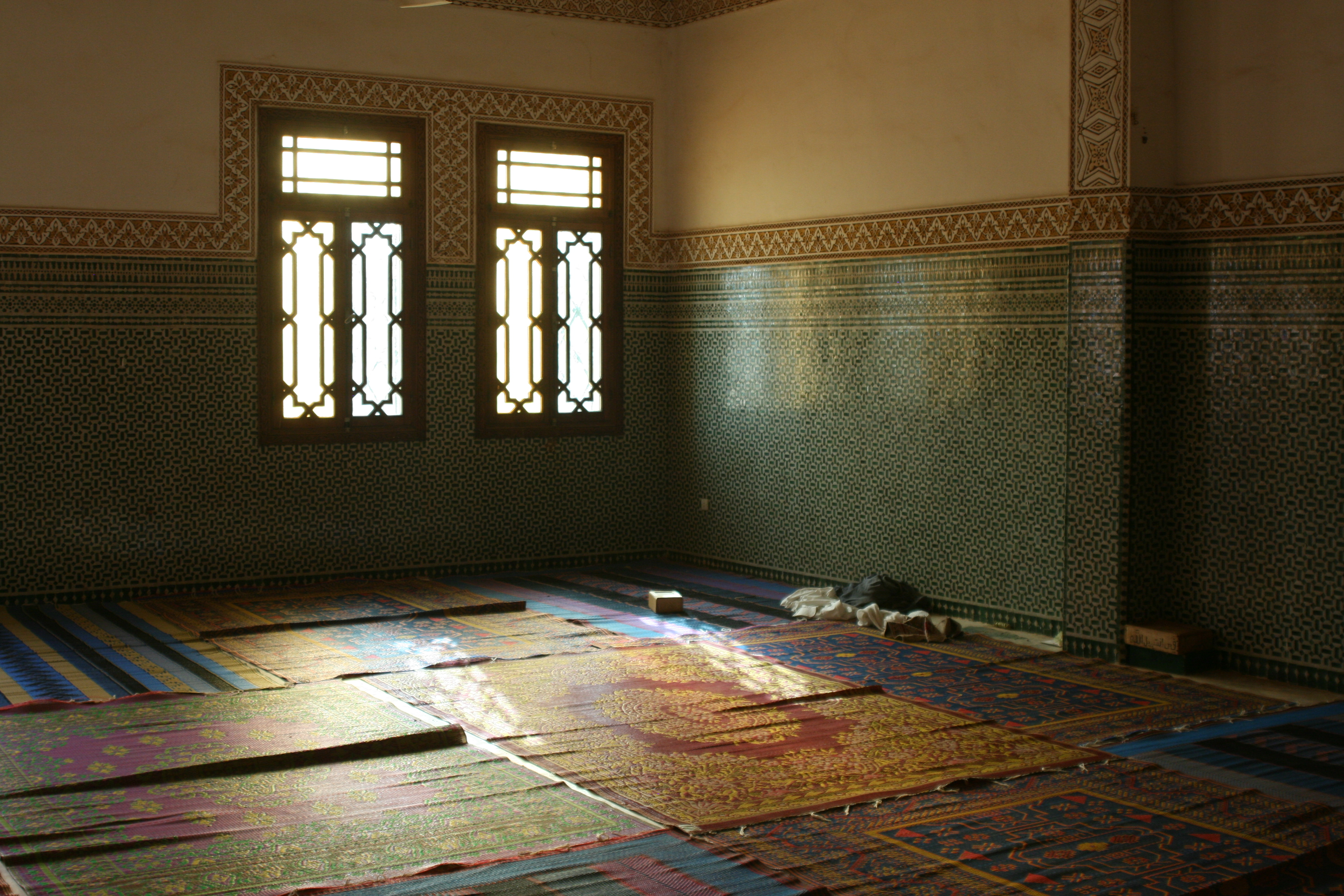
Interior of the Grand Mosque of Niamey

An Islamic revival in West Africa began in the 1990s, turning Niamey into a centre of religious activism. This occurred during the era of democratisation and the breakdown of formal education in Niger, and the city saw an increase in political Islam and support for Islamic education centres, known locally as makaranta. In subsequent decades, the city saw an increase in hijab use, mosque constructions, public sermons, and Arabic language students. In neighbourhoods such as Boukoki, the Islamic revival has increased the popularity of traditionalist gender roles that require women to stay at home, which are promoted by most Islamic educators in the city.

Sufism is popular in Niamey, and most makarantu are affiliated with the movement. Izala, a Salafi movement opposed to Sufism, is much smaller than the Tariqa Sufi movement in Niamey, but theological debates between the two are frequent. Izala gained traction in Niamey in the early 1990s and was present across the city by the 2000s. The movement established educational institutions, and its preachers became celebrities. Many congregations in the city became more conservative as they shifted from Sufism from Izala. Shiism came to Niamey later and became the target of anti-Shiism by Izala supporters. A reformist Izala faction known as Sunnance is centered on teaching its view on the sunnah rather than establishing political presence. It is popular among youths who reject the traditionalism of mainstream Izala.

Makarantu largely target the city's women and young people. During the Islamic revival, these provided the first Islamic education for many women in the city. Women with formal employment are one of the largest contingents of Islamic education proponents in the city. The city's Islamic broadcast media largely targets women. Public sermons, known as wa'azai, typically take place on Thursdays. Sunnance preachers in Niamey perform wazu, a form of Islamic outreach that involves preaching to large gatherings, with a nontraditional, dramatic style that involves narrative, humour, and colloquialisms. Popularised in the 2000s and 2010s, it is opposed by many Sufi and mainstream Izala leaders in the city. Many mosques in Niamey prohibit wazu, which is often instead performed in public places, increasing its visibility. Sunnance followers in the city also hold theological discussion groups they call ziyāra.

==== Christianity ====
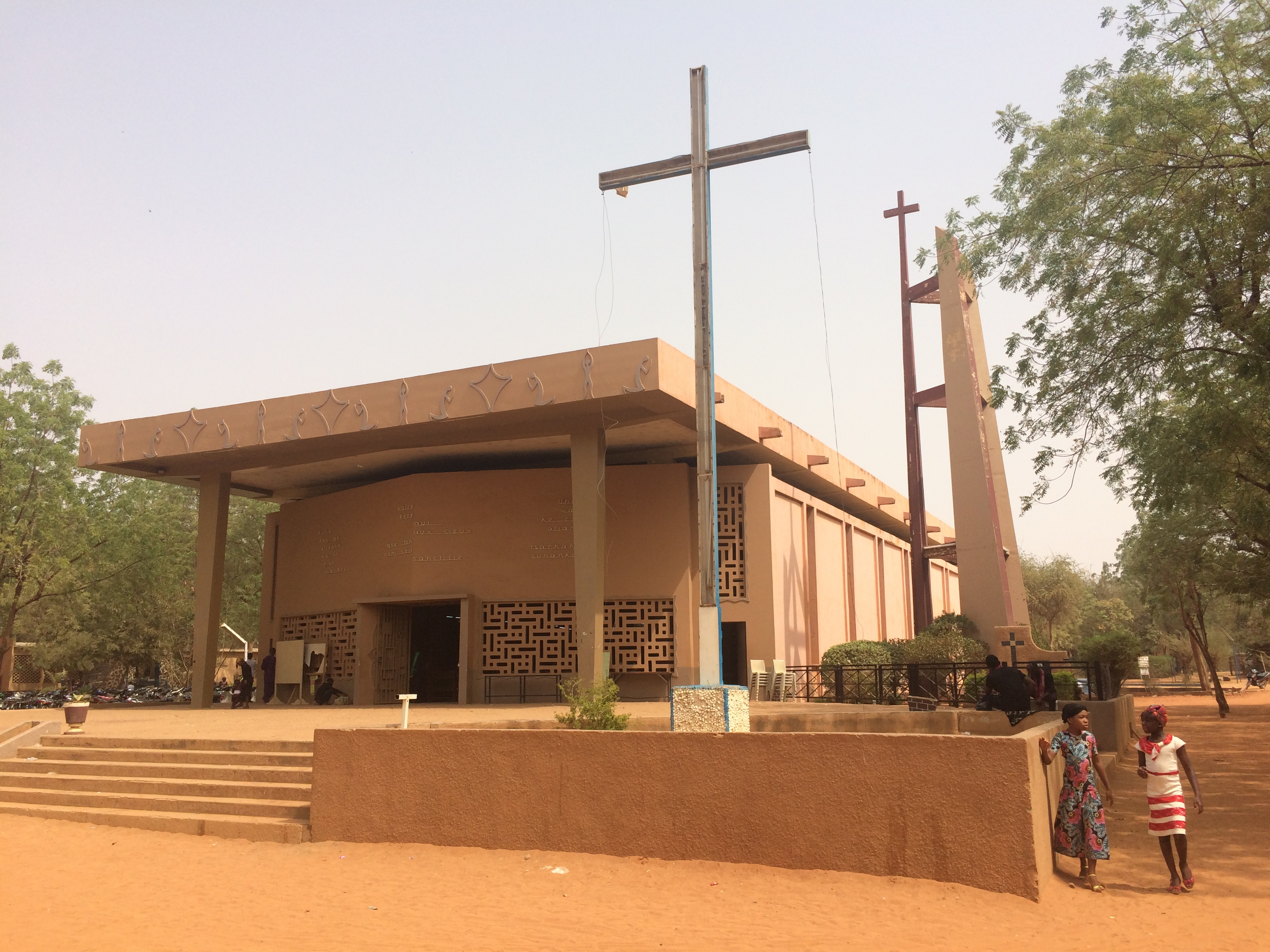
The Our Lady of Perpetual Help Cathedral, seat of the Roman Catholic Archdiocese of Niamey

Christians in Niger are mostly concentrated in Niamey and Maradi. Niamey has a Christian community descended from migrants. A large church is run by wealthy Christians with ties to Maradi and Tibiri. Francophone African immigrants are served by a French-language church and the Centre Biblique, a library run by the organisation SIM. Pentecostalism has a widespread media presence, paralleling that of Izala. The Roman Catholic Archdiocese of Niamey was founded in 1942 and has been the metropolitan diocese of the ecclesiastical province of Niger since 2014.

Niamey's first Catholic mission was established in 1931 by Father François Faroud. The Catholic mission has run secular schools in Niamey since 1949, having been supported by the colonial government as Islam overtook animism in the area. Initially teaching only boys, the Catholic school became coeducational in 1961. The Baptist Church became active in the city in the late 20th century. The Église Évangelique Salama du Niger, a Christian group established in 1989, is primarily active in Niamey.

== Economy ==
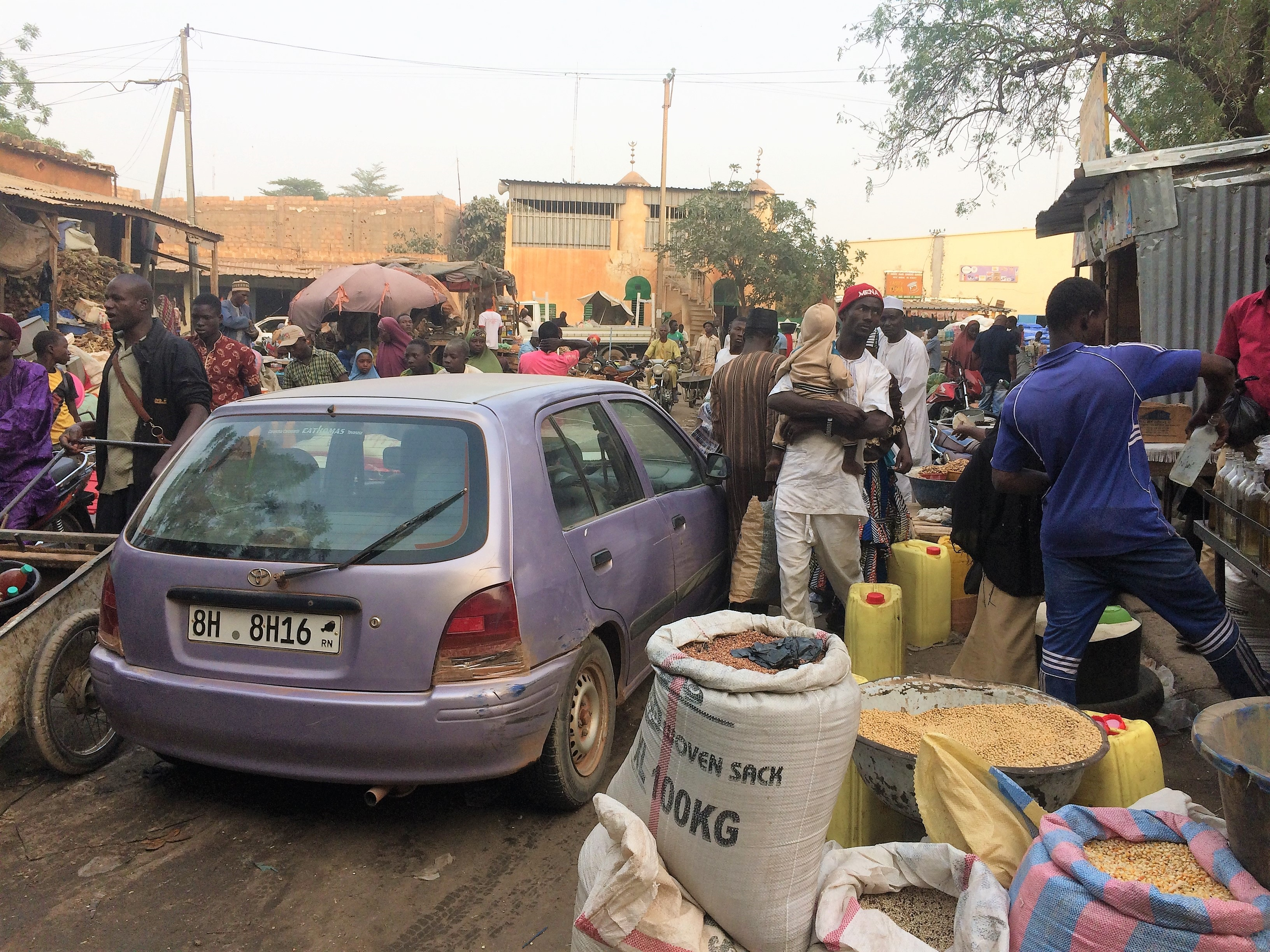
Marketplace at the Petit Marché

Niamey is the primate city of Niger. Its economic development was limited during the colonial era due to its lack of connections to other cities. Urban expansion in the 1970s and 1980s led to it becoming a regional economic centre, though its economic power is limited by its distance from larger centres, emigration to other countries, and the instability of the region. The jihadist insurgency in Niger has limited foreign demand for goods in the country, hindering some commerce in Niamey.

Niamey's main economic activities are commercial. Most people in the city rely on informal peddlers and street markets for common purchases, including food, clothing, water (see § Water), and pharmaceuticals (see § Healthcare). These vendors typically sell a single product or service. The Niamey Grand Market (Grand Marché) is the city's largest commercial site, and the Petit Marché in the city centre is the largest vegetable market. Street food vendors, mostly women, sell cowpea-based foods such as kossaï, primarily at breakfast time.

Niamey has extensive urban agriculture including animal husbandry. The city is located in a pearl millet and cowpea growing region; agricultural products include millet, meat, eggs, and dairy. Rice is grown on the floodplains the Niger River in neighbourhoods including Saga, Kirkissoye, and Losso Goungou, though rice is mostly imported. Niamey's agricultural infrastructure enables the farming of more resource-intensive vegetables than in rural parts of Niger. Demand for food in Niamey has led to an increase in farming of potatoes, which had previously been a luxury in the region. Farmers in nearby villages purchase potato seeds primarily from the Petit Marché and sell potatoes for a higher profit than more common crops. Livestock includes sheep and goats in the urban area and cattle in the periphery.

Niamey has little industrial activity, and most products are imported. Manufacturing industries include leatherworking, chemicals, and soap production. Food processing activities include brewing, dairy, meatpacking, and syrup production. Financial investment is primarily from Nigerien citizens. The city has about ten commercial banks, as well as a housing bank and an agricultural bank.

== Culture ==
=== Social activities ===
Residents of Niamey have various kinds of conversation groups.

Tea drinking groups for young men, known as fadas, are located at many spaces in the city. Fadas originated in Niamey during the 1990s democratisation era before spreading to other Nigerien cities; some members of fadas attribute their creation to the protests against the Kennedy Bridge massacre. Being active at night, fadas defend their neighbourhoods, especially in areas without police patrols. Fadas are primarily a phenomenon of unemployed men, though many fadas in the city consist of students, and some include women. Many women in the city form smaller gatherings or financially-supportive social groups called foyandi.

The city's Hausa conversation groups, or hira groups, usually assemble at streetside spots. These groups, often formed through hometown connections, are single-gender and mostly male. Most of the city's Hausa men lack full-time employment, so they spend most of their time with these groups. The city's hira groups include seasonal and long-term migrants, and some include non-Hausa people. Many people are members of multiple hira groups.

New Year's Eve is a popular holiday in Niamey due to global influence, though conservative Muslims reject it for its associations with Christmas and alcohol. It was rarely celebrated in Niamey until widespread festivities a few weeks after the city hosted the 2005 Jeux de la Francophonie. New Year's Eve provides an economic boost, being the most popular day for live music and nightlife, the only secular holiday to feature feasts, and, for many Niameyans, the only day they drink alcohol.

=== Arts and architecture ===
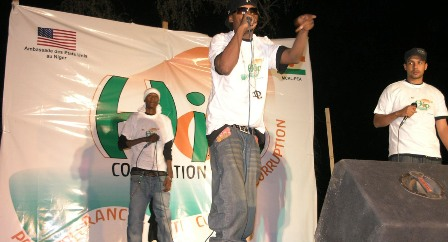
A hip-hop concert in Niamey

Fakaray, a form of oration built on improvising details, is popular among the city's youth. With the influence of global popular culture in Niamey, some musicians perform Nigerien hip-hop music in Hausa or Zarma, and hip-hop fashion is popular among young men. Organisations such as the Centre pour la formation et la promotion musicale support hip-hop production. The orchestra Tal National performs at its own concert hall in Niamey. Niamey's Islamic revival increased the popularity of women's Islamic fashion, including clothing imported from the Middle East and Asia; women who wear expensive Islamic clothing are known idiomatically as hajiya. Meanwhile, Western fashions became popular among wealthy, Western-educated women, as well as a group of young women known as les souris d'hôtel (transl. hotel mice).

Niamey is the Nigerien city with the most photography studios. Most photographers in the city are Togolese, Beninese, or Nigerian Yoruba immigrants, with the latter running 75% of the city's studios in 2000. Apprenticeships led to the spread of Yoruba photography across the city. Niamey is a centre for pottery markets, with Saga historically being a centre of Bella Tuareg pottery. Most of the pottery sold in Niamey is made in the nearby village of Boubon. Niamey has a large market for Tuareg craftwork and art, often purchased by Western expatriates, which has motivated Tuareg artisans to work in the city; the market of Château 1 became a popular place for such products in the 1990s.

Most of Niamey's tall buildings were built during the uranium boom of the 1970s and 1980s. In addition to storefronts and high-rise office buildings, the city centre contains stadiums, cultural centers, and the Musée National Boubou Hama. Niger being a predominantly Muslim country, mosques are the most common places of worship, with the Grande Mosquée being the largest in the city. There are also various Christian churches, including Our Lady of Perpetual Help Cathedral, the seat of the Roman Catholic Archdiocese of Niamey, and the Cathedral de Maourey. The Niamey 2000 neighbourhood, the first dense housing estate in the city, was designed by the firm united4design for middle-class residents. It was built with local materials and was one of the first projects in the city to use compressed earth block construction.

=== Sport ===
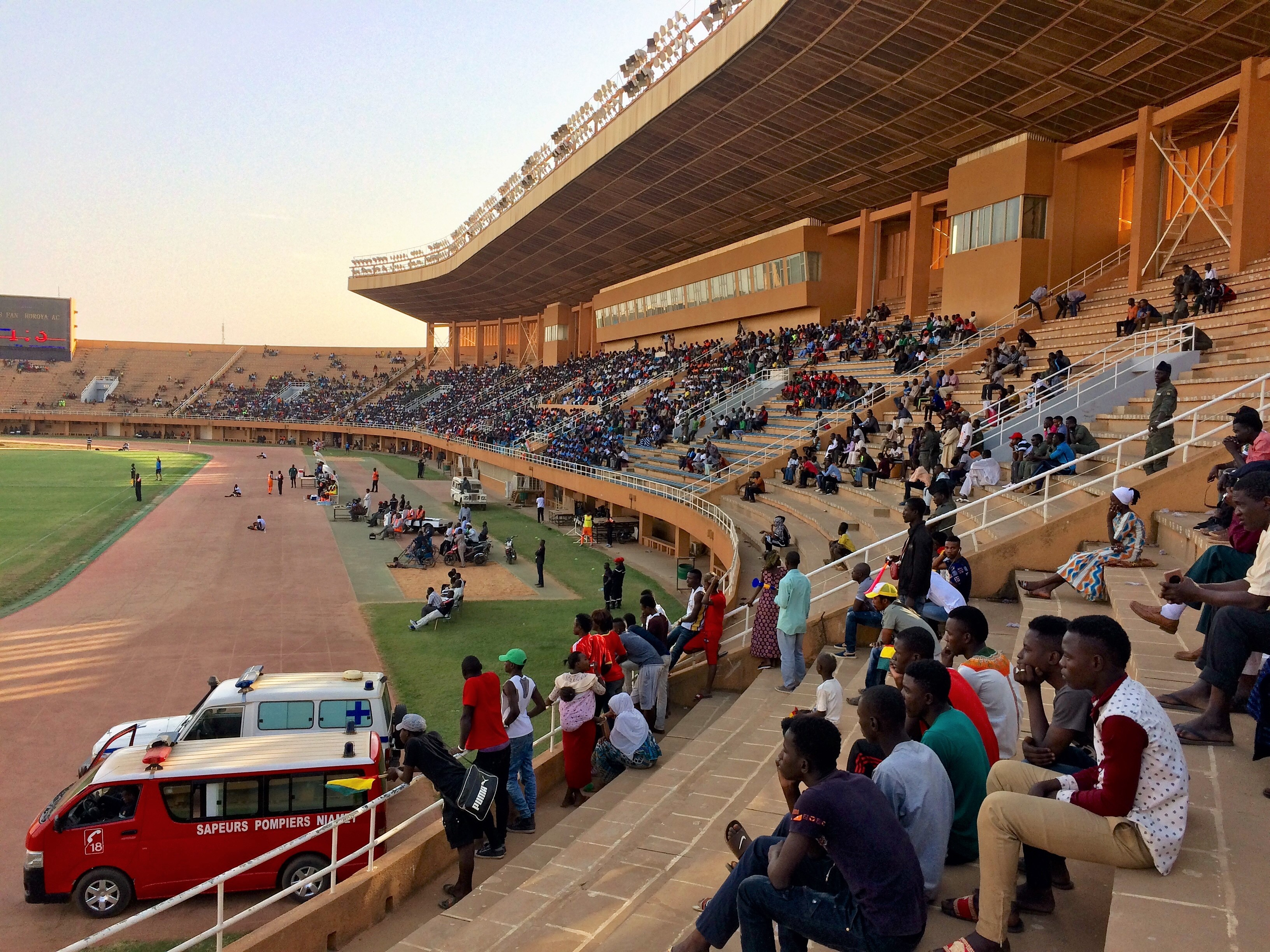
People watching a football game at the Stade Général Seyni Kountché

Many men in Niamey are fans of football. The national stadium, Stade Général Seyni Kountché, holds matches between Nigerien football teams as well as international matches. Football clubs were established in each quartier of Niamey in 1964, under Diori Hamani. Prominent football clubs in Niamey's neighbourhoods include Olympic FC de Niamey in Lacouroussou, Sahel SC in the Nouveau Marché neighbourhood, AS Renaissance in Boukoki, and Étoile Rouge FC in Talladjé. Niamey also holds the annual national traditional wrestling competition. The city's basketball league is the only one in operation in the Nigerien Basketball Federation, as of 2024.

=== Media ===
The press in Niger is predominantly centred in Niamey. The government ran radio broadcasts in the city since independence; the Office of Radio and Television of Niger was formed in 1967 to broadcast government propaganda, which continued until democratisation in 1990. Niamey had the country's first commercial radio in 1994. Radio networks based in Niamey include Studio Tamani and Studio Kalangou. Many Hausa residents consume international news media such as BBC Hausa. The first television programming in Niamey was the Niger School Television Program in 1966.

== Governance ==
=== Administration ===
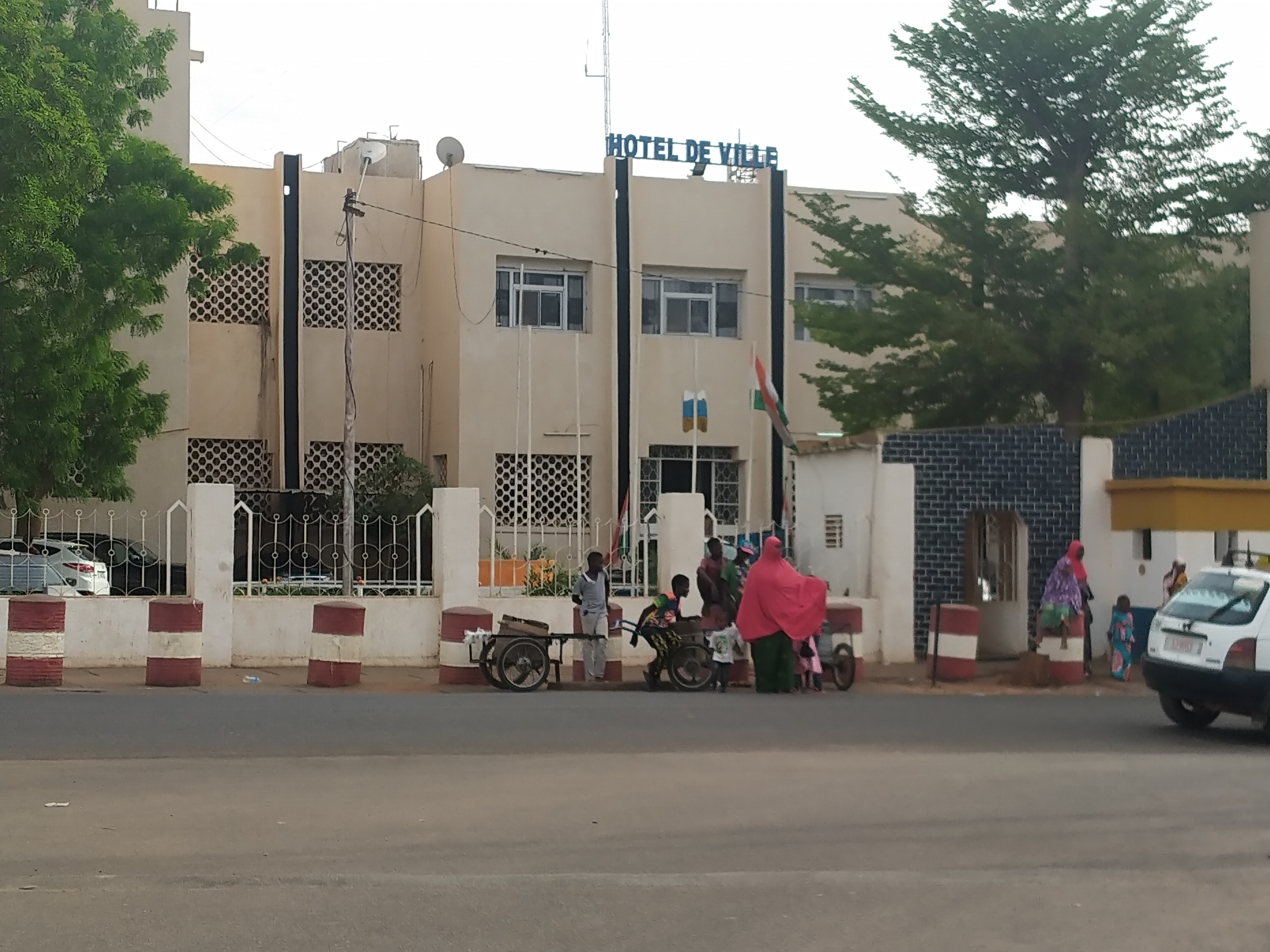
City Hall of Niamey

Niamey makes up a capital district of Niger, the Niamey Urban Community (CUN), a first-level subdivision equal to the seven regions of Niger. The CUN's administration, appointed by national leaders, is led by the Governor of Niamey, accompanied by the Secretary General and Assistant Secretary General. On a municipal level, forty-five councillors are popularly elected and in turn elect the Prefect Mayor; the first mayor under this system was Oumarou Dogari in 2011. The City Council and Mayor have limited roles compared to the CUN Governor. The city was placed under military rule in 2024, with the municipal government being dissolved. Before, the municipal government was largely funded through sale of land. The CUN also has three traditional chiefdoms: Saga lies entirely within the community, while Karma and Lamordé extend into Tillabéri Region. Traditional chiefs have less power than in other parts of Niger; they perform tax collection and act as community representatives. Neighbourhood chiefs (chefs du quartier) also exist without government recognition, mostly in lower-class neighbourhoods.

Niamey has one of two courts of appeal in the judiciary of Niger (with the other in Zinder). The Court of Appeal of Niamey oversees four district courts, including the Higher District Court of Niamey, which has the largest caseload in Niger. Other courts located in Niamey include the Niamey Regional Court, the Council of State and the Constitutional Court.

Niamey has a low rate of violent crime. The city's public spaces, including greenspaces and market neighbourhoods, have criminal reputations in public discourse. With increased police presence after the 2010 coup, Niamey was divided into three sectors with night patrols by different state police groups: the Gendarmerie Nationale on the right bank, Police Nationale on the left bank, and Garde Nationale on the north side. Niamey has a higher proportion of women in police, customs, and forest service positions than most of the country, and the gendarmerie has noted "a large proportion of single women and a preference to reside there." In addition to state police, Niamey has most of the country's private security companies; the oldest, GED Services, was founded in 1988. Yan banga, informal defence forces, exist in peripheral neighbourhoods, where they are sometimes established by chiefs. These belong to specific neighbourhoods, unlike police, though some yan banga lose the support of their neighbourhoods.

=== Divisions ===
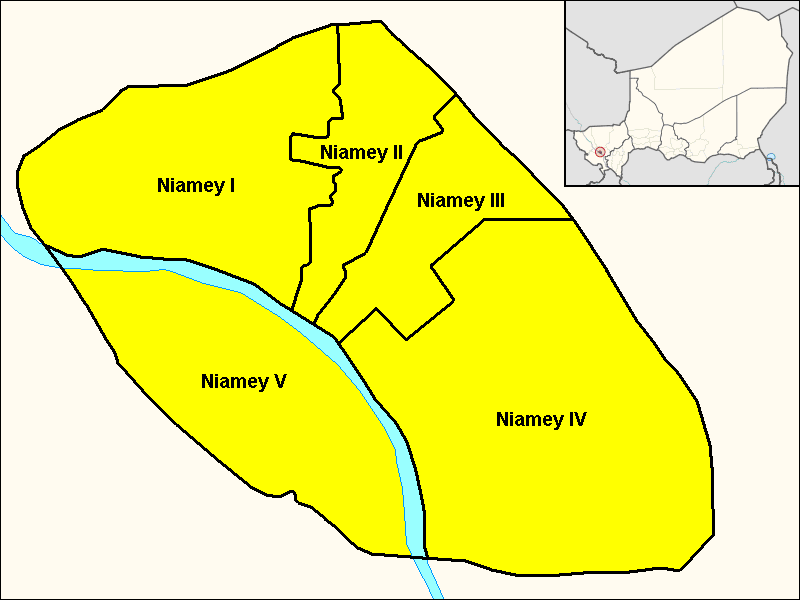
City map with the 5 communes

Under Law No. 2002-15, passed on 11 June 2002, the CUN contains five municipal districts. These districts were labelled as communes of Niger, although the Niamey Urban Community is the central authority. Each commune elects a council and a mayor with administrative duties. The urban area of the CUN is organised into 90 quartiers, and the rural area consists of 37 attached villages, as of 2023. Each quartier has an elected government.

Commune	Population (2022 estimate)	Quartiers	Villages
Niamey I	287,902	18	8
Niamey II	338,455	22	5
Niamey III	223,685	16	7
Niamey IV	376,271	23	10
Niamey V	181,321	11	8

The boundaries of Niamey's communes are based on historic villages: Niamey I contains Goudel and Yantala; Niamey II contains Maourey, across the gully of Gounti Yéna from Niamey I; Commune III contains Kalley; Commune IV contains Gamkalé and Saga; and Commune V, on the right bank, was the site of Fula settlements.

== Infrastructure ==
=== Transport ===
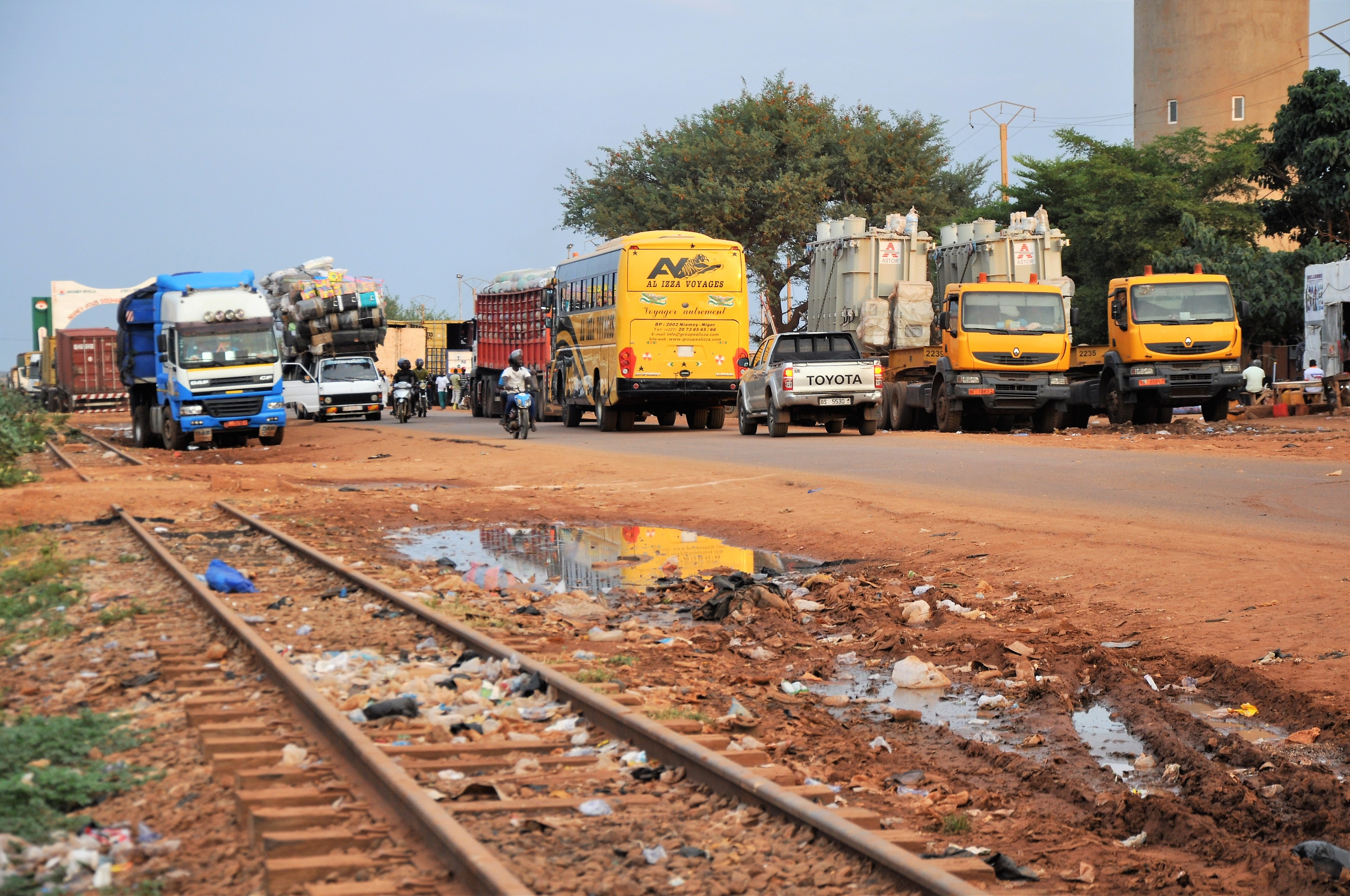
Unused railroad track next to Route Nationale 1

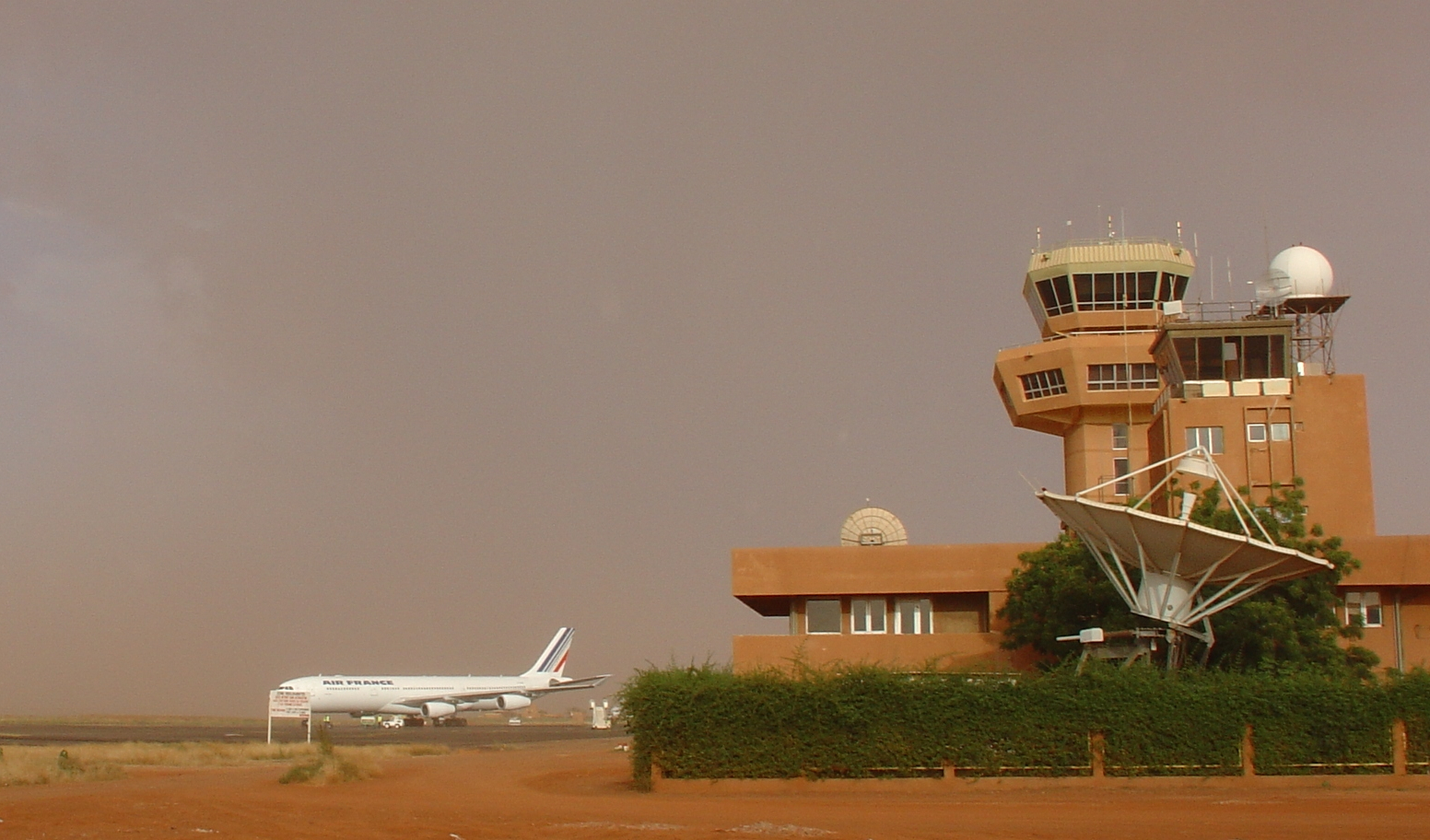
Diori Hamani International Airport

Niamey's roads are traversed by cars, motorcycles, pedestrians, goats, and camels. Most of the population travels primarily by foot, while about 9% own cars, and another 9% own motorbikes, as of 1996. Roads are the main mode of transportation between Niamey and the rest of Niger. Niamey is crossed by the RN1 highway (or La Route de l'Unité), connecting it to N'guigmi on the eastern edge of Niger. Niamey is located on routes connecting northern Niger to coastal West Africa and the Sahara. The route between Niamey and Agadez, which takes approximately one day of driving, is a significant path for trans-Saharan migrants.

Cargo frequently travels via Benin as it has the closest seaport to Niamey, the Port of Cotonou. Boats are infrequently used to travel the Niger River as it traverses little of Niger. A freight company has operated along the Niger River since 1975 but, as of 2008, has an annual load of only a few thousand tons, and there is a lack of support for a planned connection to the coast. The main highway in western Niger connects Niamey to Benin, linking to the country's rail system. Following plans from the 1970s for a railway to Benin, Niamey railway station, the first one built in Niger, was inaugurated in April 2014, and rails between Niamey and Dosso, Niger, were completed in January 2016. However, the extension to Benin failed, the rails fell into disrepair, and disassembly began in 2024. Niamey is served by Diori Hamani International Airport, located to the southeast of the city centre. The airport houses a military base, Air Base 101.

=== Healthcare ===
Most people in Niamey have experience with biomedicine, Islamic medicine, and folk medicine (including medicinal plants and spiritual healing), with uncertainty about health issues requiring them to seek multiple providers. The city has better healthcare than rural Niger, though patients are often unhappy with medical professionals whose behaviour is impersonal or violates social norms. As of 2012, Niamey has one doctor for every 6,774 people, one nurse for every 3,765 patients, and one midwife for every 832 women of reproductive age, lower than WHO recommendations. Scarcity of required medications, materials, and labour leads to a high level of improvisation among the city's medical professionals. Marabouts who act as folk healers are common the city, advertising their treatments to the population with limited access to biomedicine. Most pharmaceuticals are purchased from street vendors, known in Hausa as akwaku (lit. 'clerk'), (Note: Also known in Zarma as safarikoy (lit. 'medicine vendor' and in French as médicin par terre (lit. 'street doctor')) who sell generic drugs in individual portions for much lower prices than licensed pharmacies. These began operating in the 1990s and became widespread in the 2010s. The city's akwaku are universally male and largely Zarma, and they carry products in pushcarts or on their heads. They lack pharmaceutical expertise and buy from unlicensed wholesalers, mostly at the Grand Market. Despite widespread views of medical professionals as charlatans, Niameyans largely rely on akwaku when facing health problems.

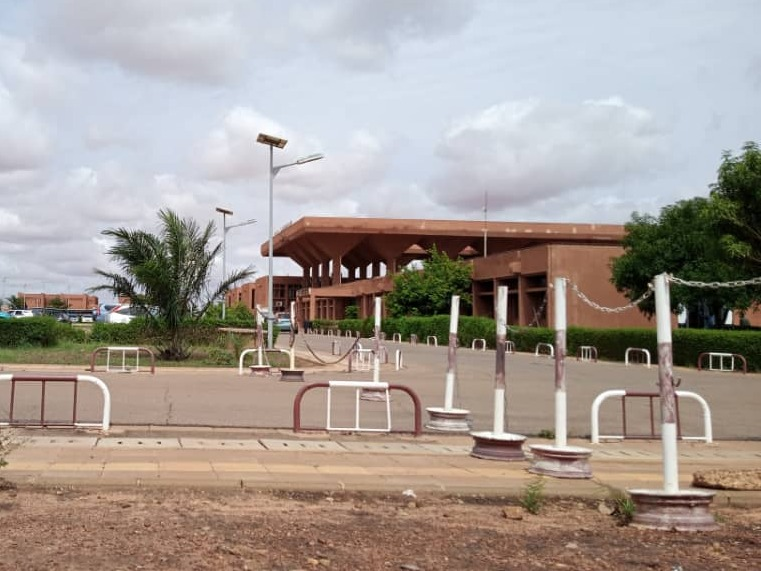
A hospital in Niamey

The largest medical facilities in Niamey are the Niamey National Hospital and the Lamordé National Hospital. The Niamey National Hospital, Niger's main referral hospital, treats mostly outpatients, particularly in the specialisations of dentistry, ophthalmology, and ENT. A national economic decline in the late 1990s caused low funding for the National Hospital. Maternité Issaka Gazoby (MIG) is the national-level obstetric and gynaecological referral hospital. Additional maternity wards are in the Talladjé and Poudrière neighbourhoods. Other health centres include the Magori Clinic and the Lakouroussou Clinic. Blood transfusions are performed at the Niamey Regional Blood Transfusion Center, with plans to be implemented at the National Hospital and MIG, as of 2016. Niamey is also home to Niger's reference hospital for tuberculosis, the National Anti-Tuberculosis Center.

Despite the presence of maternal health centres, Niamey has high maternal mortality, with a rate of 30.7 per 100,000 births in 2022. Many patients seeking prenatal care get inadequate treatment. Biomedical contraception is widely availabile in pharmacies and medical facilities but is used less frequently than plant-based folk medicine, as many people view it as foreign. Many Niameyan women use contraception or abortion to control birth spacing, despite norms favouring large families. As abortion is illegal in the country, they often seek abortions abroad.

=== Public utilities ===
As of 2005, 54.4% of households in Niamey have electricity, while 38.3% have water. Niamey's electrical grid is run by NIGELEC, a state-owned enterprise. The city's water supply is operated by the private firm Société d'Exploitation des Eaux du Niger (SEEN) and runs on infrastructure owned by the state-owned Société de Patrimonie des Eaux du Niger (SPEN). Many residents of Niamey lack connections to these utilities because urban expansion has outpaced the expansion of the grids. Many informal neighbourhoods are excluded from utilities as their residents lack legal recognition. Some residents of informal neighbourhoods negotiate with the public utility firms or invest their own funds to connect to the grids. The grids are unreliable during the hot dry season, especially on the right bank.

==== Energy ====
Energy in Niger, including in Niamey, is dependent on imports from Nigeria, which were halted in the 2020s due to tensions between the countries. A 132-kilovolt connection to Niamey from Birnin Kebbi, Nigeria, has a capacity of 120 megawatts. The city's grid is also powered by the thermal power plants of Gorou Banda (80 megawatts) and Istithmar (89 megawatts) as well as a solar power plant (30 megawatts). The United Nations Economic and Social Council began solar power development in the city in 1964, the first in West Africa. The city has a climate conducive to solar panels but lacks financial incentives for widespread implementation.

Niamey has typical electricity usage for a city. Its average electrical load is about 90 megawatts, with a peak of about 123 megawatts during extreme heat. Niamey frequently experiences power outages, despite government plans for the country's oil industry to improve electricity access. Some residents who are not connected to the electrical grid install electric generators, solar panels, or unauthorised wiring that connects to the grid, while others rely on portable lights and mobile phone charging services. Firewood is a vital energy source in the city, with annual usage increasing from 70,000 tons in 1977 to 200,000 tons in 2007. It is harvested from distant forests, with the largest source being the municipality of Torodi.

==== Water ====
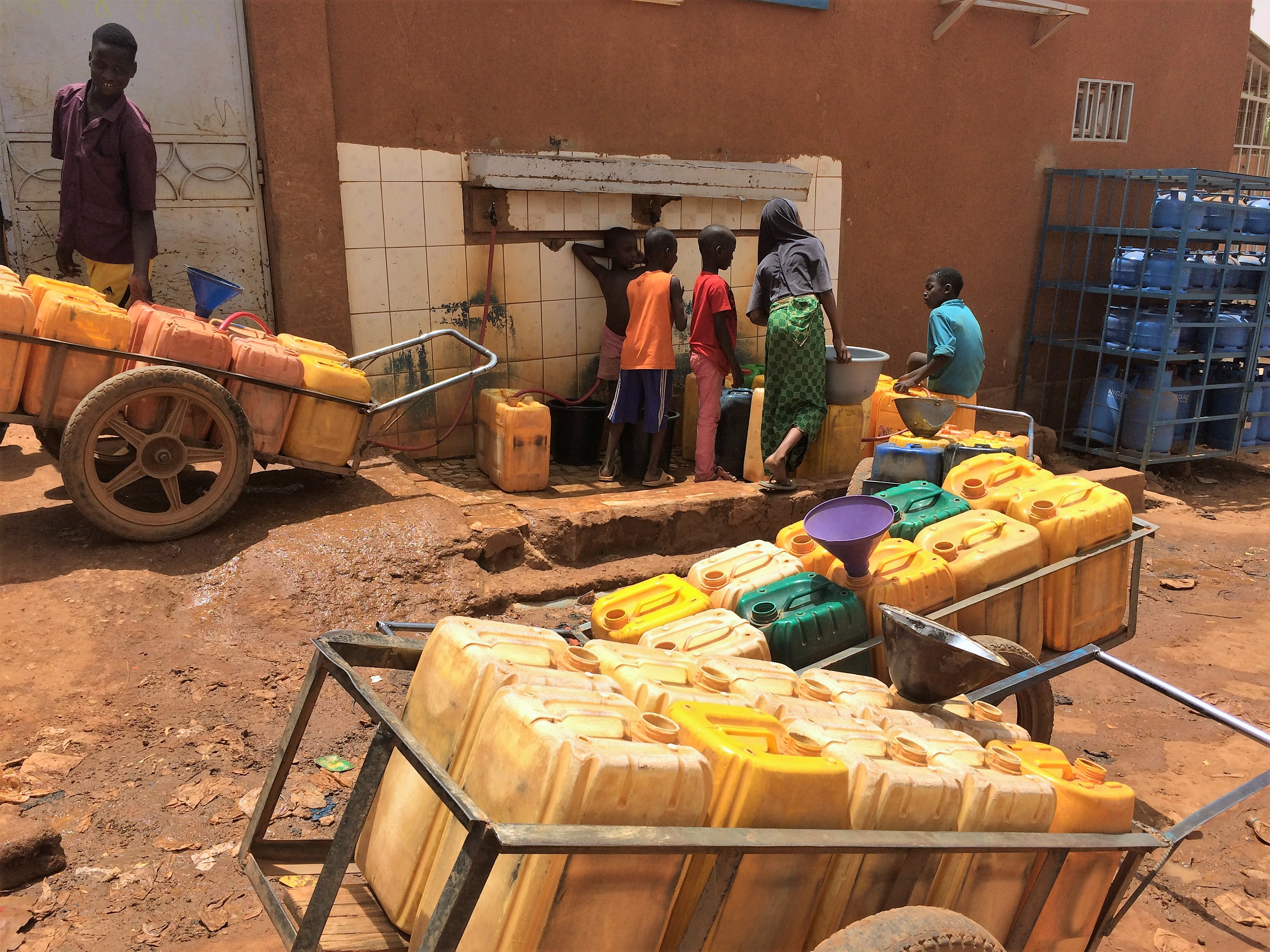
A standpipe with ga'ruwa carts

The Niger River is the sole source of Niamey's water supply. Increased use resulted in a decline in the river's water quality in the late 20th century. Unlike most of Niger, Niamey has a central water supply, so the resource is sold as a commodity. According to official sources, pipes serve about 65% of Niamey's population as of 2008. (Note: By another estimate, pipes serve about one-third of Niamey's population, as of 2019.) The rest receive water from sources such as publicly funded standpipes or water towers funded by charities or Islamic organisations. Standpipes are the cheapest source of water, with a cost of 15 francs (3 US cents) for 25 litres, as of 2014. Niamey's neighbourhoods have uneven access to water. Neighbourhoods in both the periphery and the city centre have low use of taps; SEEN does not operate in these neighbourhoods due to their topography or lack of legal recognition. Hand-dug wells exist in lower-class neighbourhoods of the periphery and are often polluted, though they have become rare as neighbourhoods install communally funded boreholes. More affluent neighbourhoods in the periphery are connected to the pipe system. In such neighbourhoods, wealthy residents often supply water for their poorer neighbours. Compounds have taps in courtyards; only upper-class residents have taps inside their houses. Access to piped water is unreliable during the dry season, when water usage increases due to heat. During this time, water is supplied by water towers, installed by SEEN in most neighbourhoods, or smaller tanks in some households and compounds.

People whose homes lack piped water purchase water from vendors, leading to higher water prices for poorer residents. Water deliverers, known in Hausa as ga'ruwa (lit. 'there is water'), purchase water from standpipes to fill 25-litre jugs, which they deliver to households via pushcart. Providing over half of the city's drinking water, ga'ruwa operate in groups on regular routes and make an above-average income. Ga'ruwa are universally male; most are immigrants from around eastern Mali who are predominantly Tuareg or Fula. They receive annual municipal licences and operate informal guilds and apprenticeships. Other vendors sell water sachets, known in Hausa as piya wata (from the English pure water). Water sachet vendors arose around the 1990s, manually filling sachets imported from Nigeria; factories were established by the early 2000s and supplanted manual production by the 2010s. Water sachets are sold by street vendors with coolers, especially in poor neighbourhoods; this is a common entry-level job in the city, with many boys employed by female relatives. Water sachets are also sold at shops, including in wealthy neighbourhoods. Vendors purchase water sachets from small-scale producers, which purchase water from ga'ruwa, and more popularly from large-scale producers, which use printed labels and piped water. Bottled water is rare and expensive. The bottled water market is dominated by local brands—which are more contaminated than piped water—alongside high-end French brands. Most households store water in clay pots.

Standpipes were installed in the 1950s by the French semi-public Société Energie A.O.F., the predecessor of NIGELEC. These offered subscription pricing, leading to the ga'ruwa business model. The water utility became independent from NIGELEC during the Kountché administration, forming the Société National des Eaux) (SNE, transl. National Water Company) under the Ministry of Hydraulics. Droughts of the 1980s dried the Niger River, and construction of wells increased. After the privatisation of SNE under Baré, Niamey's water supply became unreliable; in 1990, an estimated 22% of the city's inhabitants had access to water taps, though the government gave this figure as 45%. SEEN began operating the city's water utility in 2001, under a plan from the World Bank. The French firm Veolia Water purchased a 51% share in SEEN the same year. The World Bank's plan increased the price of water, with the intention that wealthier users pay for more water, which critics say does not account for the needs of large, poor households. Investment in the 2000s and 2010s led to a large increase in standpipes, but access to water in the city remained low.

==== Waste management and sanitation ====
Niamey produces about 1,400 tonnes of waste per day, as of 2020. Most waste consists of sand and organic matter such as pruned branches, leaves, and food waste. The city does not have a standardised waste collection system. Plastic litter is common, including used water sachets. Waste is often burned or enters the Niger River. Residents of some wealthy neighbourhoods hire private waste collectors, who often dump waste in poor neighbourhoods in the absence of recycling facilities. Reuse of materials is common in the city; scrap metal is often recycled at the Marché de Katako.

Niamey's sanitation system drains wastewater with rainwater along the Gounti Yéna valley. Waste dumped on the ground pollutes the river and groundwater, and litter often obstructs drainage pipes. As of 2020, municipal wastewater treatment has been non-functional for over a decade; some factories and hospitals treat their wastewater themselves. Contamination of the water supply is exacerbated during the rainy season due to flooding.

== Education ==
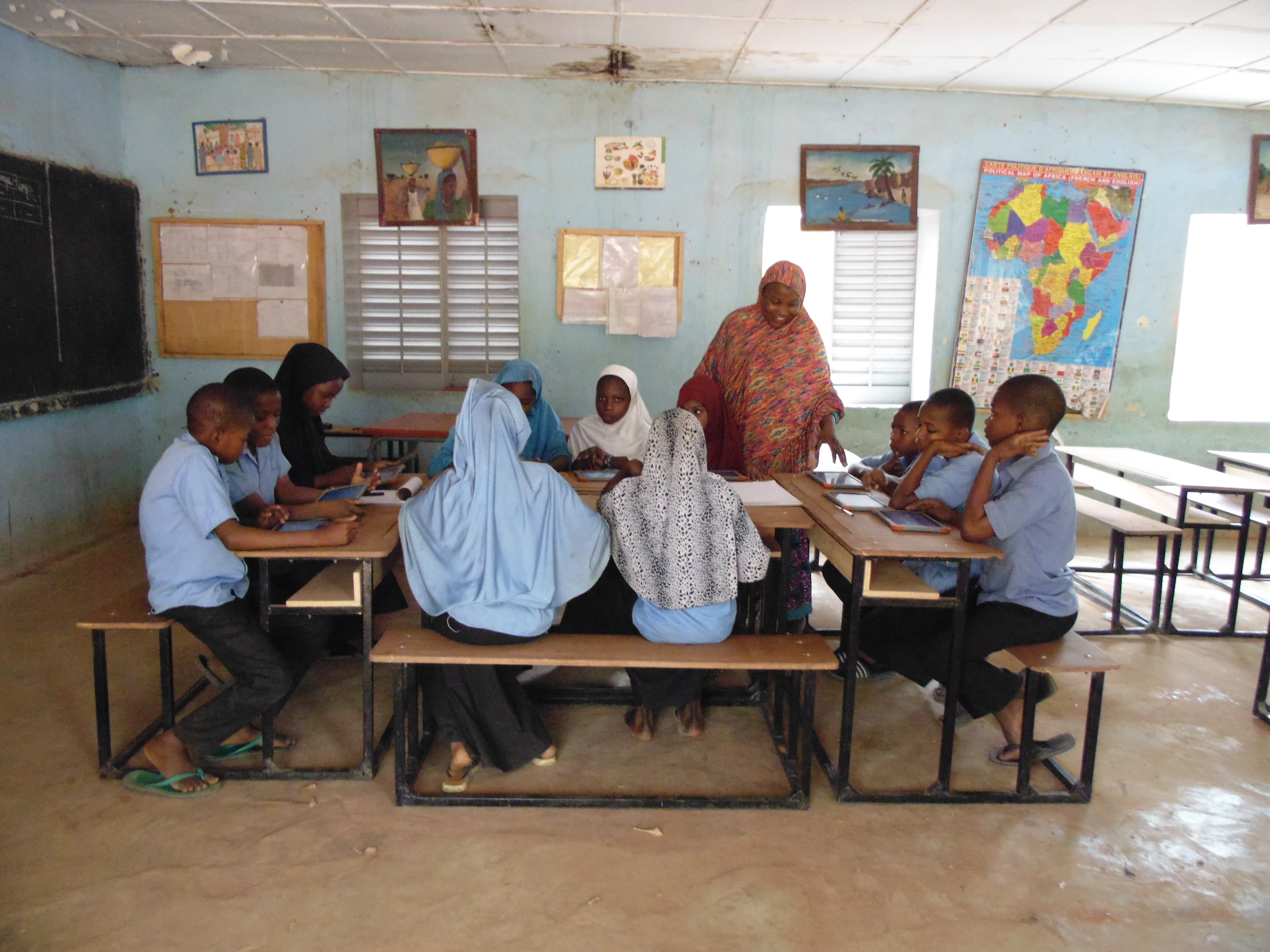
A classroom in Poudrière

Abdou Moumouni University (AMU) in Niamey is the most prominent university in Niger. It has 29,605 students, as of 2022, most of whom come from outside of the city. The university was founded as the Centre d'Enseignement Superieur in 1971 and became a university in 1973. It has a large political influence, having been the site of Marxist-Leninist activism in the 1990s and Salafi activism in the 2010s, and some protests at the university have resulted in military intervention.

The city has several types of secular and Islamic education. Quranic education, both formal and informal, is popular. Such education is not publicly funded, and some children in the city engage in begging to pay for it. The Collège Mariama, one of the most prestigious secondary schools in Niger, was founded during the colonial era by the Catholic Church. Informal neighbourhoods often lack public services such as schools. After widespread advocacy from residents, the first school in the Pays Bas opened in 2008, serving 1,000 students, followed by another in Pays Bas and one in Tondigamay in 2010.

Number of schools in Niamey (2022)
Level	Total	Public	Private
Preschool	589	358	251
Primary school	808	489	319
Secondary school	253	49	204
Vocational education	98	16	82

== Notable people ==
- Victorien Adebayor (born 1996), footballer
- Yacouba Ali (born 1992), footballer
- Rahim Alhassane (born 2002), footballer
- Hassana Alidou (1963–2023), diplomat, Ambassador to the United States and Canada (2015–2019)
- Issaka Assane Karanta (1945–2020), politician
- Lucien Bouchardeau (1961–2018), FIFA football referee
- Ibrahim Chaibou (born 1966), FIFA football referee
- Celia Diemkoudre (born 1992), volleyball player
- Hamani Diori (1916–1989), first President of Niger
- Harouna Doula Gabde (born 1966), former footballer and football manager
- Oumarou Ganda (1935–1981), actor and film director
- Abdoulaye Harouna (born 1992), basketball player
- Sani Issoufou Mahamadou (born 1983), politician
- Youssouf Oumarou (born 1993), footballer
- Abdoulaye Katkoré (born 1993), footballer
- Karim Lancina (born 1987), footballer
- Moussa Maâzou (born 1988), footballer
- Lalla Malika Issoufou (born 1975), former First Lady
- Ali Mohamed (born 1995), footballer
- Rakiatou Kaffa-Jackou (born 1965) aeronautical engineer and politician
- Souleymane Ly (1919–1994), educator and politician
- Mariama Mamane, environmentalist and engineer
- Zara Moussa, singer
- Samira Sabou (born 1981), journalist and blogger
- Zalika Souley (1947–2021), actress
- Salamatou Sow (born 1963), anthropologist and sociolinguist
- Daouda Malam Wanké (1946–2004), de facto President of Niger (1999) and military leader
