= List of companies of Niger =

Location of Niger (in dark blue)

Niger, officially the Republic of Niger, is a landlocked country in Western Africa, named after the Niger River. It borders Nigeria and Benin to the south, Burkina Faso and Mali to the west, Algeria and Libya to the north and Chad to the east. The economy of Niger centers on subsistence crops, livestock, and some of the world's largest uranium deposits. Drought cycles, desertification, a 2.9% population growth rate, and the drop in world demand for uranium have undercut the economy.

== Notable firms ==
This list includes notable companies with primary headquarters located in the country. The industry and sector follow the Industry Classification Benchmark taxonomy. Organizations which have ceased operations are included and noted as defunct.

Notable companies Status: P=Private, S=State; A=Active, D=Defunct
Name	Industry	Sector	Headquarters	Founded	Notes	Status	
Arik Niger	Consumer services	Airlines	Niamey	2009	Airline, defunct 2010	P	D
COMINAK	Basic materials	General mining	Akokan	1974	Joint state uranium mining venture with Areva (France)	S	A
Dounia TV	Consumer services	Broadcasting & entertainment	Niamey	2007	Broadcaster	P	A
Escadrille Nationale du Niger	Consumer services	Airlines	Niamey	2003	State-owned airline	S	A
NIGELEC	Utilities	Conventional electricity	Niamey	1968	Power generation	S	A
Niger Poste	Industrials	Delivery services	Niamey	2005	Postal services	S	A
Office of Radio and Television of Niger	Consumer services	Broadcasting & entertainment	Niamey	1960	State broadcaster	S	A
Sociéte Nigerienne de Transports de Voyageurs	Consumer services	Travel & tourism	Niamey	1964	State-owned passenger transportation	S	A
SOMAIR	Basic materials	General mining	Arlit	1971	Joint state uranium mining venture with Areva (Franc	P	A
SONIDEP	Oil & gas	Exploration & production	Niamey	1977	State oil and gas	S	A
SONITEL	Telecommunications	Fixed line telecommunications	Niamey	1997	Telecom	S	A
Télé Sahel	Consumer services	Broadcasting & entertainment	Niamey	1964	National broadcaster	S	A

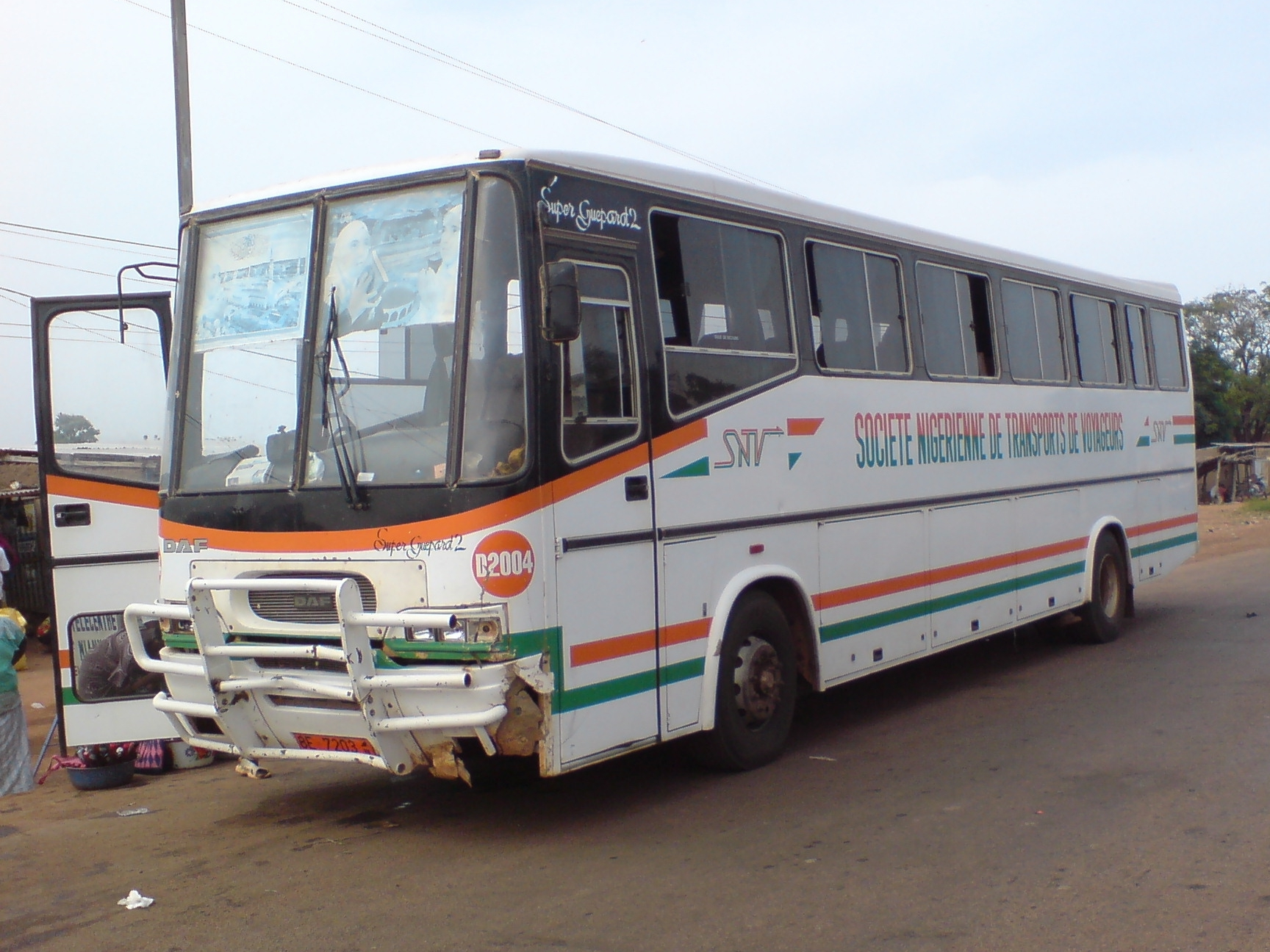
A Sociéte Nigerienne de Transports de Voyageurs coach bus

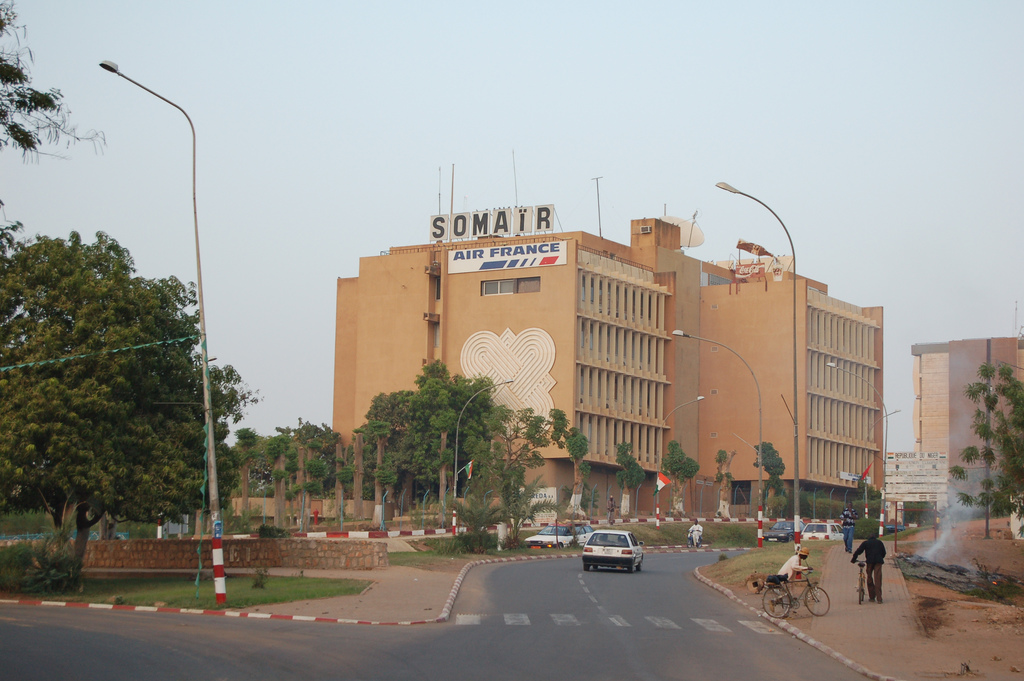
SOMAIR's headquarters building in Niamey, Niger

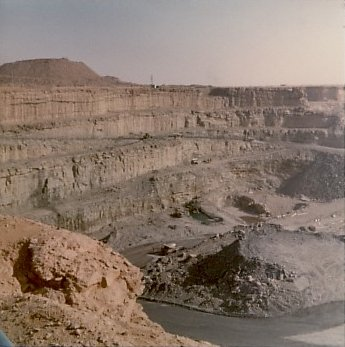
Arlit mine under SOMAIR in Niger

== See also ==
- List of airlines of Niger
- List of banks in Niger
- List of hospitals in Niger
