= Arik Niger =

Subsidiary arik air of Nigeria airline

| IATA | ICAO | Call sign |
|---|---|---|
| Q9 | NAK | - |
- Founded: 2009
- Ceased operations: February 2010
- Hubs: Diori Hamani International Airport
- Fleet size: 2
- Parent company: Arik Air
- Headquarters: Niamey, Niger
- Website: www.arikair.com

Arik Niger was the Nigerien subsidiary of Arik Air based in Niamey, Niger. Founded in 2009, the airline suspended operations in February 2010.

== Destinations ==
Arik Niger served the following destinations from Niamey before ceasing operations:

- Benin
  - Cotonou - Cadjehoun Airport
- Niger
  - Agadez - Mano Dayak International Airport
  - Maradi - Maradi Airport
  - Niamey - Diori Hamani International Airport Base
  - Tahoua - Tahoua Airport
  - Zinder - Zinder Airport
- Nigeria
  - Abuja - Nnamdi Azikiwe International Airport
  - Kano - Mallam Aminu Kano International Airport

== Fleet ==
Arik Niger operated the following aircraft:

- 2 - Fokker 50 (Leased from Denim Air)
