= Air Niger =

Nigerien airline

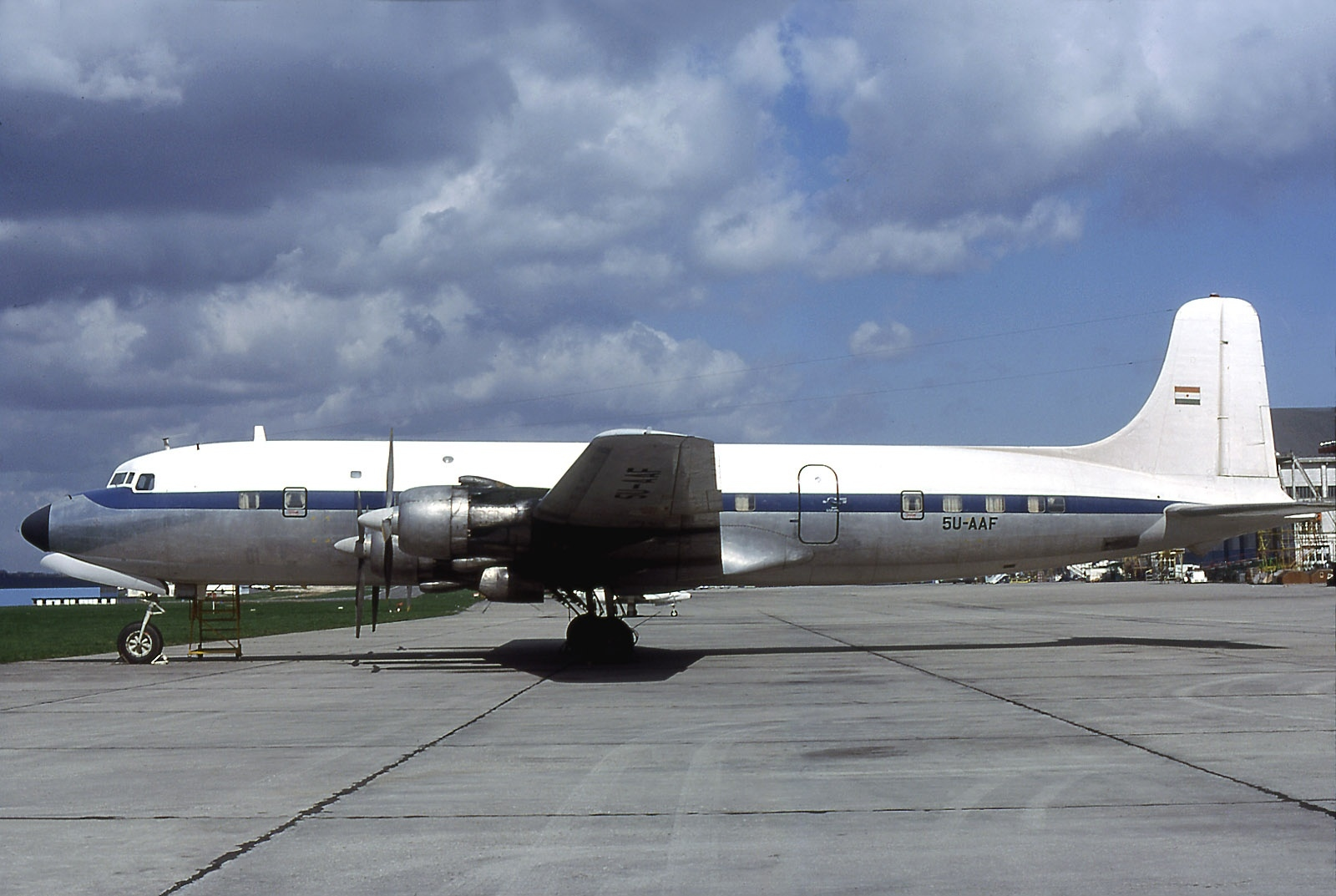
- DC 6B, Niger
IATA	ICAO	Call sign
AW	AWM	AIR NIGER
- Founded: 1966
- Ceased operations: 1993
- Hubs: Diori Hamani International Airport
- Secondary hubs: Maradi Airport
- Focus cities: Mano Dayak International Airport
- Destinations: 10 (at the time of closure)
- Parent company: Government of Niger
- Headquarters: Niamey, Niger

Air Niger was an airline based in Niamey, Niger, that operated from 1966 until 1993.

== History ==
The airline was formed in 1966 by the government of Niger with assistance from Air France and Union des Transports Aériens, taking over services from the defunct Aero Niger. Besides former air taxi and charter operations of Aero Niger, the new airline took over Air France domestic services in Niger and to Upper Volta, Nigeria and Chad. In addition to providing technical assistance to the airline, Air France and UTA held a financial stake in the airline via their holdings in SODETRAF. Air Afrique also held a stake in the airline. The airline which was 94.5% owned by the Niger government ceased operations in 1993.

== Services and fleet ==
The airline operated services from Niamey to Tahoua, Maradi, Zinder and Agadez. In the late 1960s, its fleet comprised one Douglas DC-3 and one Douglas DC-4. Plans were made to extend its network to Upper Volta, Chad and Nigeria. Throughout the 1970s its fleet comprised two DC-3s, and by the late 1980s it was operating two Hawker Siddeley HS.748s on domestic services and to Lomé in Togo.

== Destinations ==
Country	City	Airport
Burkina Faso / Upper Volta	Ouagadougou	Ouagadougou Airport
Chad	N'Djamena	N'Djamena International Airport
Niger	Agadez	Mano Dayak International Airport
Niger	Maradi	Maradi Airport
Niger	Niamey	Diori Hamani International Airport
Niger	Tahoua	Tahoua Airport
Niger	Zinder	Zinder Airport
Nigeria	Abuja	Nnamdi Azikiwe International Airport
Nigeria	Lagos	Murtala Muhammed International Airport
Togo	Lomé	Lomé–Tokoin Airport

== Fleet ==
- Douglas C-47
- Douglas DC-3
- Douglas DC-4
- Douglas DC-6
- Fokker F-27-600 Friendship
- Hawker Siddeley HS 748

== Accidents and incidents ==
- On 10 June 1977, Douglas C-47 5U-AAJ was written off in a forced landing at Founkouey following an engine failure. The aircraft was on a scheduled passenger flight which had departed from Tahoua Airport. All 21 people on board survived.
