= Transport in Niger =

Transport in Niger primarily consists of roads, most of which are unpaved. The state runs one long distance coach service, while other long distance and local routes are run by private companies, using a variety of vehicles. Most Nigeriens do not own vehicles. Roads are also commonly used by animals pulling wagons.

Niger has no operating railways within the country, although Niger uses railway lines in Togo and Benin to transport goods from sea ports further inland. There are multiple railway stations within the country, but none are currently operational. There is a proposal to build a rail connection to Nigeria.

Niger has several airports, but only two have regular commercial international flights.

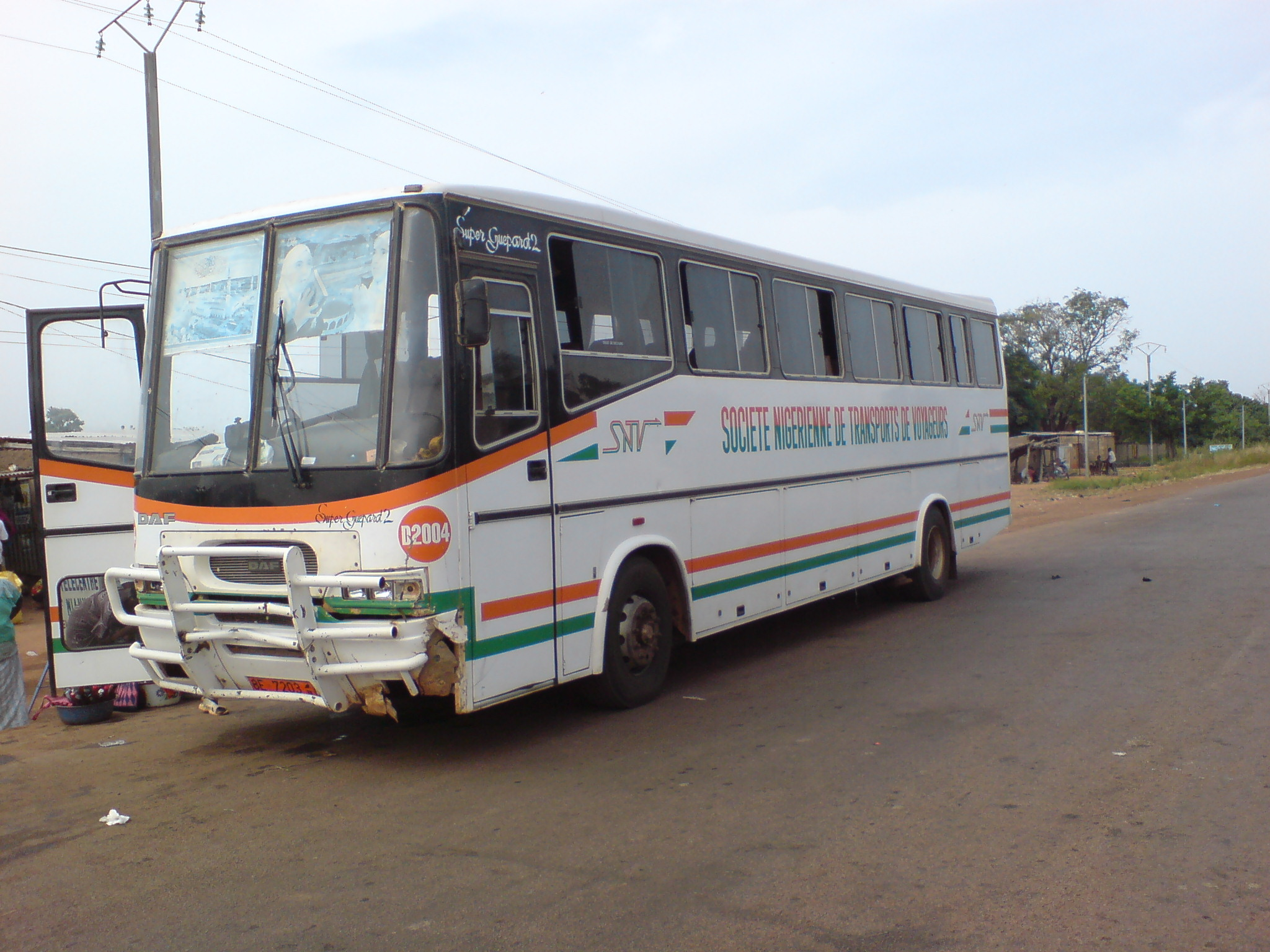
A state-run SNTV coach running between Ouagadougou, Burkina Faso and Niamey, Niger. Road transportation is a major form of travel across the huge distances between Niger population centers as most Nigeriens do not own vehicles.

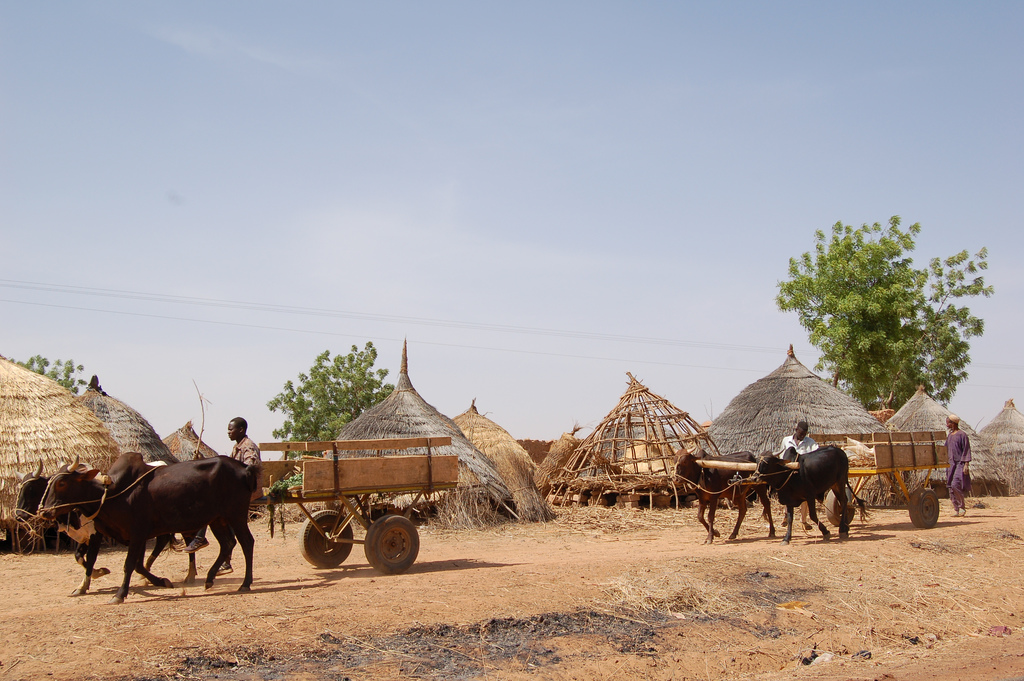
Horsecarts are a common sight on Niger's roads, like these near Diffa in far south-eastern Niger.

== History ==
Niger's transportation system was underdeveloped during the colonial period (1899–1960), mainly dependent on animals, humans, and limited river transport in the far southwest and southeast. No railways were built during the colonial era, and roads outside the capital remained unpaved. The Niger River is unsuitable for large-scale river transport as it lacks depth for most of the year and is interrupted by rapid speeds in many areas. Camel caravan transportation has historically been important in the Sahara desert and Sahel regions, which cover most of northern Niger. It is also used in the Sahel area, the home of the capital Niamey.

== Governance ==
Transportation, including vehicles, highways, airports, and port authorities, are monitored by the Nigerien Ministry of Transport's Department for Land Water and Air Transport ("Ministère des Transport et de l'aviation civile/Direction des Transports Terrestres, Maritimes et Fluviaux"). Border controls and import/export duties are monitored by the independent tax police, the "Police du Douanes." Air traffic control is monitored and operated in conjunction with Pan-African ASECNA, based on one of its five air traffic zones at Niamey's Hamani Diori International Airport. A non-governmental organization, the Nigerien Public Transport Consumer Council ("Conseil Nigérien des utilisateurs des Transports Publics CNUT"), advocates on behalf of public transport users, including roads and airports.

== Highways ==
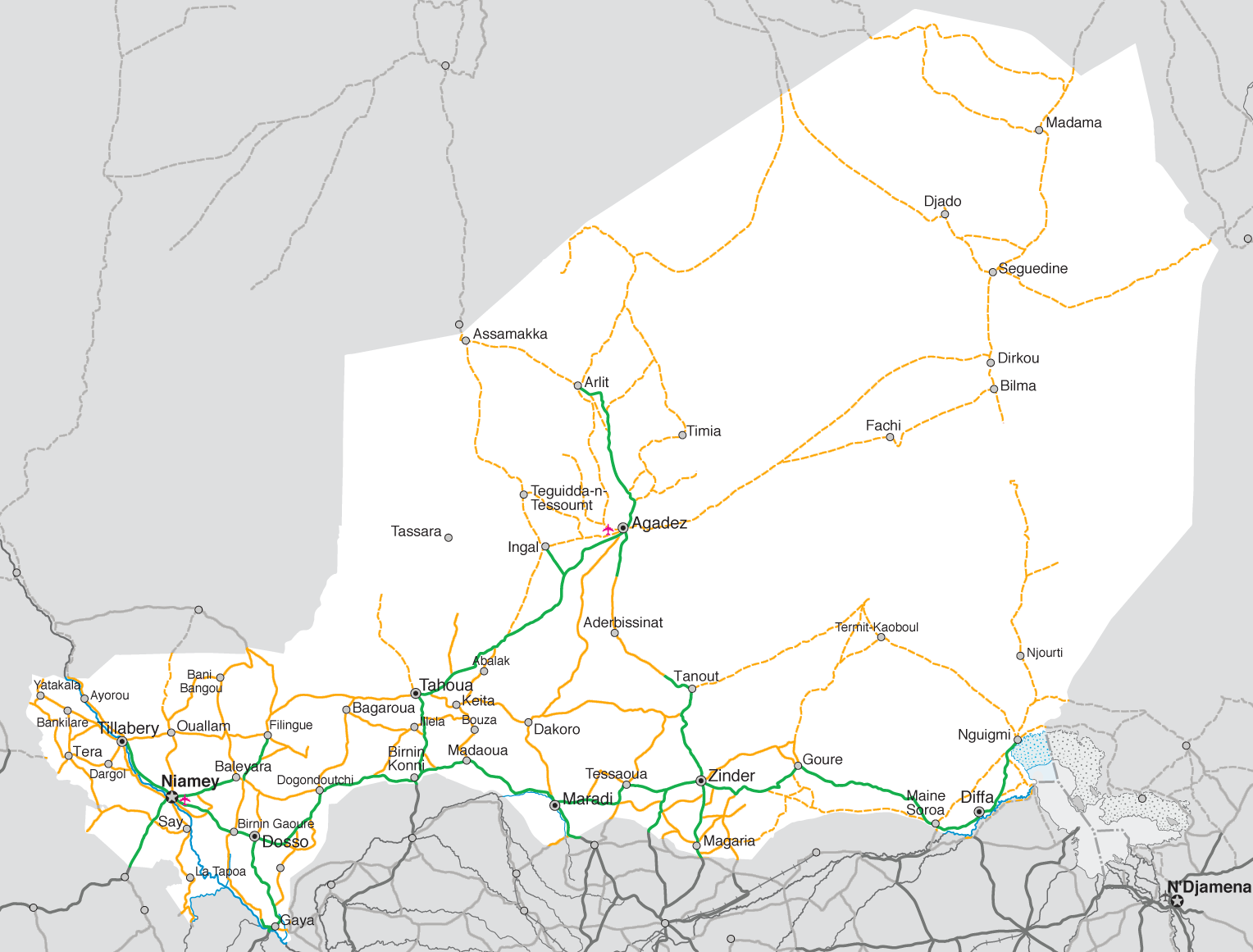
The Nigerien road network. Paved roads are in green, "improved" (gravel or laterite) are in solid orange, "pistes" or dirt roads and tracks are orange dashes.

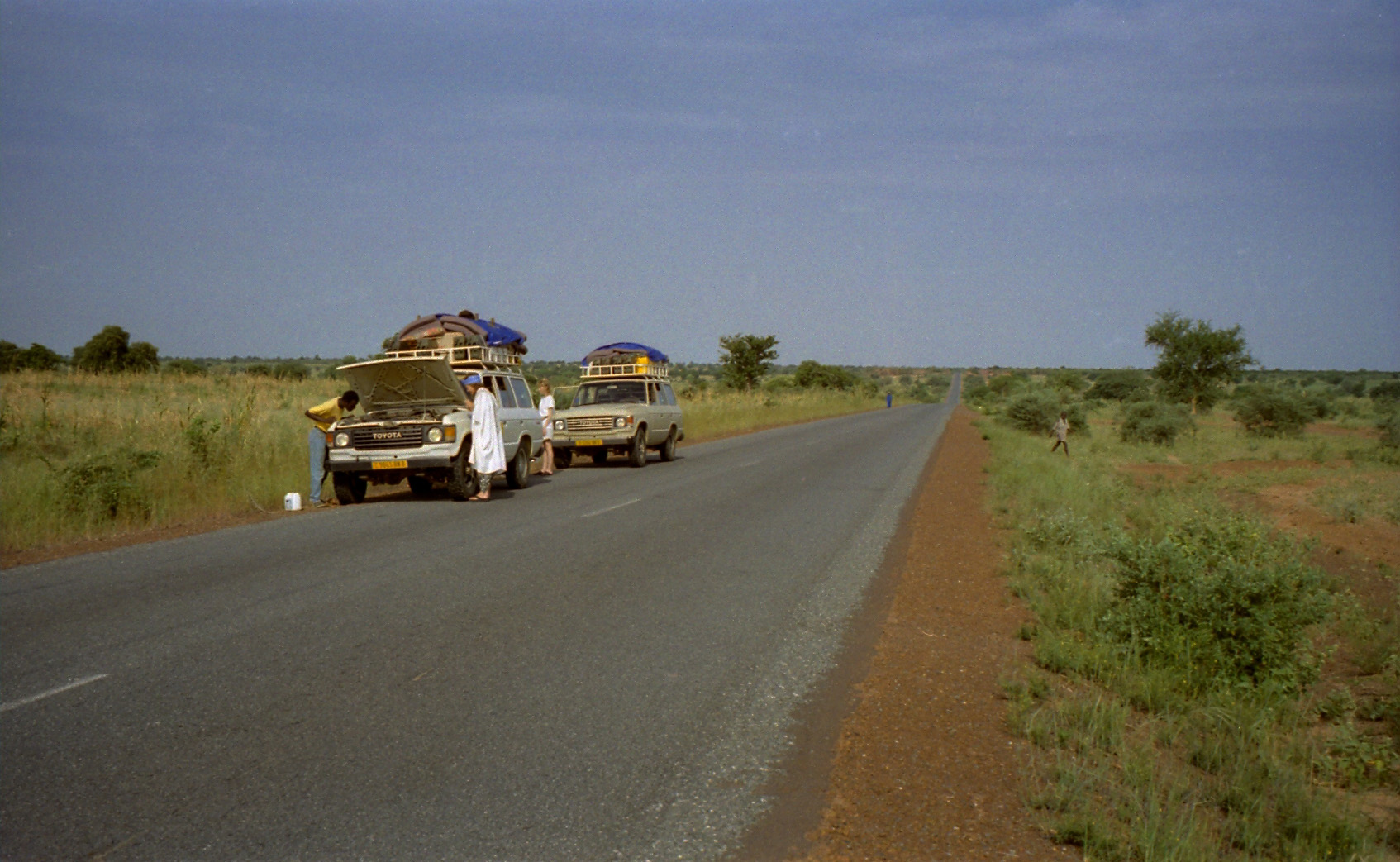
Two tourist vehicles stop for repairs on the main Niamey - Tahoua "Route Nationale", 1997.

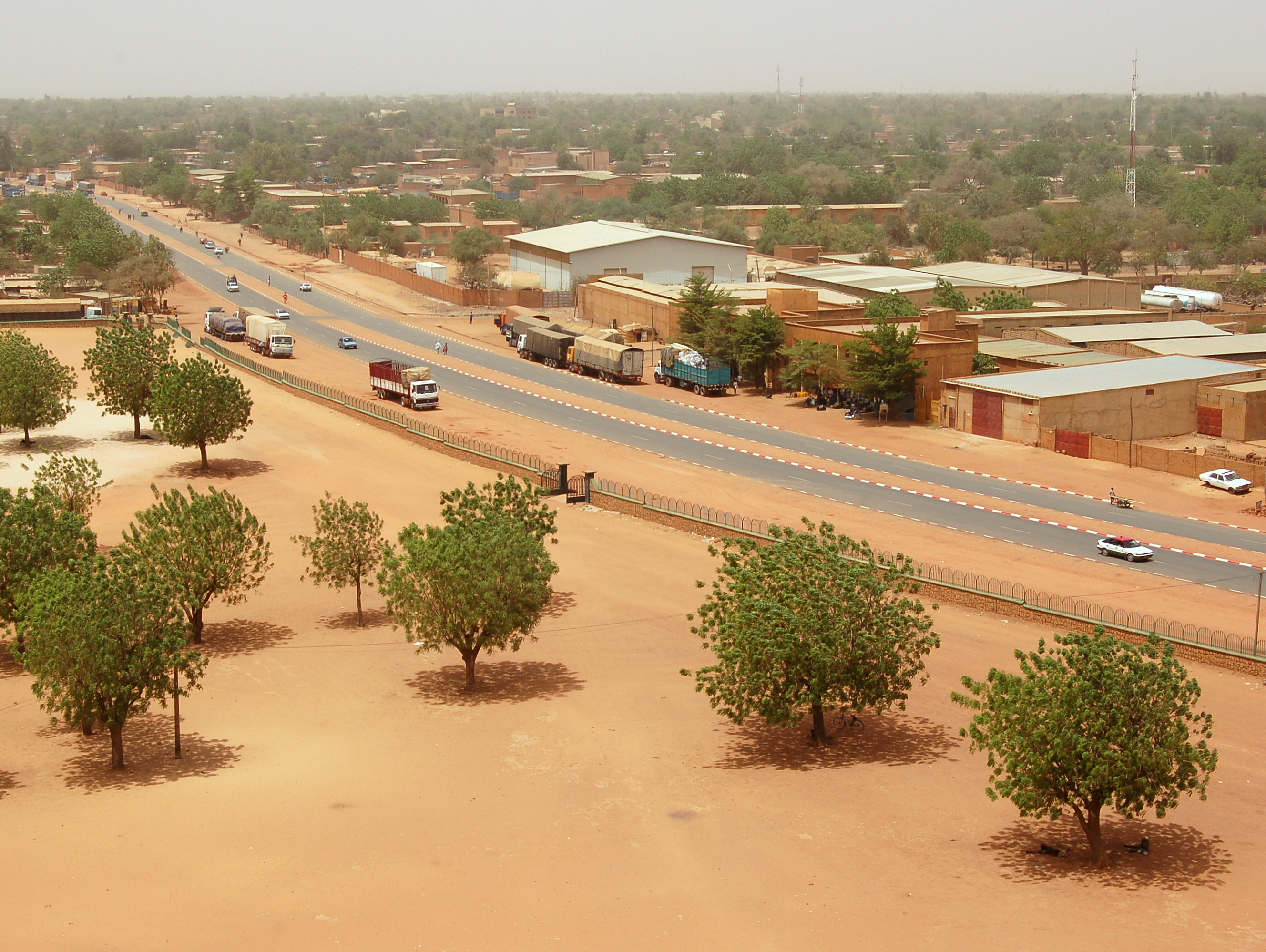
Truck and car traffic along Boulevard Mali Bero, Niamey.

Outside of cities, the first major paved roads were constructed from the northern town of Arlit to the Benin border in the 1970s and 1980s. This road, dubbed the Uranium Highway, runs through Arlit, Agadez, Tahoua, Birnin-Konni, and Niamey, and is part of the Trans-Sahara Highway system.

An additional paved highway runs from Niamey via Maradi and Zinder towards Diffa in the far east of the nation, although the stretch from Zinder to Diffa is only partially paved. Portions of this route are used by the Trans-Sahel Highway route. The Niger section is 837 km long (of which 600 km were in poor condition as of 2000), via Niamey, Dosso, Dogondoutchi, Birnin-Konni, and Maradi to the Nigerian border at Jibiya.

Other roads range from all-weather laterite surfaces to grated dirt or sandpistes, especially in the arid north.

The United States government in 1996 estimated there were a total of 10,100 km of highways in Niger, with 798 km paved and 9,302 km unpaved, but make no distinction between improved or all-weather roads and unimproved roads. In 2012, there were 19,675 km (12,225 mi) of road network throughout Niger, of which only 4,225 km (2,625 mi) were paved.

=== Routes Nationale ===
The national road system ("Routes Nationale") is numbered and prefixed with "RN", as RN1. The numbering system contains routes or sections which are as yet unpaved or even unimproved tracks. Route Nationale no. 25, for example, is a major paved highway from Niamey to Filingué, follows the partially improved Route Nationale no. 26 towards Abala, veers off onto a dirt track (locally called a Piste) from the villages of Talcho to Sanam, where RN26 also terminates from another direction. RN25 then continues along a piste through a largely uninhabited desert for almost 100 km before reaching the city of Tahoua, served by other major paved roads. The main "Uranium Highway" then coincides with the RN25 to Arlit in the far north. Consequently, the informal names for the routes (e.g., "Uranium Highway") serve a somewhat more practical purpose than the RN numbers.

=== Road transport ===
Nigeriens in both urban and rural areas rely on a combination of motor vehicles and animals for the transport of themselves and commercial goods. Road transport is the major form of travel across the huge distances between Nigerien population centers despite most Nigeriens not owning their own vehicles. In cities, public transport systems are largely absent, so a variety of privately operated services carry many urban dwellers. Vans, cars, motor coaches, trucks, and even converted motorbikes provide paid transport. Intercity coach systems are the standard form of personal transport, with the government operating one bus service (the SNTV) and a multitude of buses, "bush taxis" (taxi brousse), small vans, and semi-converted trucks taking passengers and goods. Services are sometimes scheduled from the "Highway stations" ("Gares routières") found in every town but are more frequently ad hoc: vehicles ply the trade between towns, picking up at stations or anywhere along the route, and departing only when full.

Animals pulling wagons and loaded camel trains remain a common sight on Nigerien roads.

=== Motor vehicle regulation ===
Vehicles in Niger are subject to the "Laws of the Road" ("Code de la route"), for which the government began a continuing reform in 2004–2006, which are based substantially on French models. Vehicles travel on the right side of the road and roads use French-style signage. Routes Nationale is marked with the traditional French Milestones: a white tablet with a red top, marked with the route number. Vehicle owners must obtain a registration document (“carte grise") and vehicle license plates ("plaques d’immatriculation"), which are of similar manufacture to those in Guinea and Mali. License plates usually contain the national code "RN" for international travel. Niger is a signatory to the September 1949 Geneva Convention on Road Traffic and thus honors international drivers licenses from other signatories. Drivers’ licenses are regulated through the national Ministry of Transport but issued by local officials. Drivers must pass a driver's test to qualify.

A 2009 enforcement blitz in Niamey resulted in numerous arrests of owners of small motorbikes, common in Nigerien cities. One newspaper reported that most riders believed erroneously that there was no license or regulation required by law for motorbikes under 50cc in engine size, although these had been regulated in law since 2002 but not enforced. Motorbikes are also common means of public transport in some Nigerien cities. These motorcycles "taxis motos", or "kabu kabu", are the primary form of taxis in cities like Zinder, Agadez, and Maradi. In Zinder, a 2009 local newspaper report claimed there were no more than "three to five" automobile taxis operating in a diffuse city, which subsequently relies upon the only partially regulated motorcycle taxi sector.

=== Road safety ===
Road accidents have been identified as a major public health concern by the Nigerien government. According to Chékarou Bagoudou, Chief of the Division of Road Safety and Security of the Nigerien Ministry of Transport, there were 4338 officially reported road accidents in 2008, with 7443 victims, of which 616 were killed. With the Nigerien government counting 18949 km of roads in the nation, this comes to one accident for every five kilometers in 2008. Speaking before a National Assembly session, Bagoudou said that the 42.2 billion CFA francs spent on medical costs for road accident victims accounted for around 25% of the 2008 budget of the Nigerien Ministry of Public Health. Transport figures concluded that 70% of road accidents were caused by "human factors", 23% by mechanical faults, and 7% by road conditions.

== Waterways ==
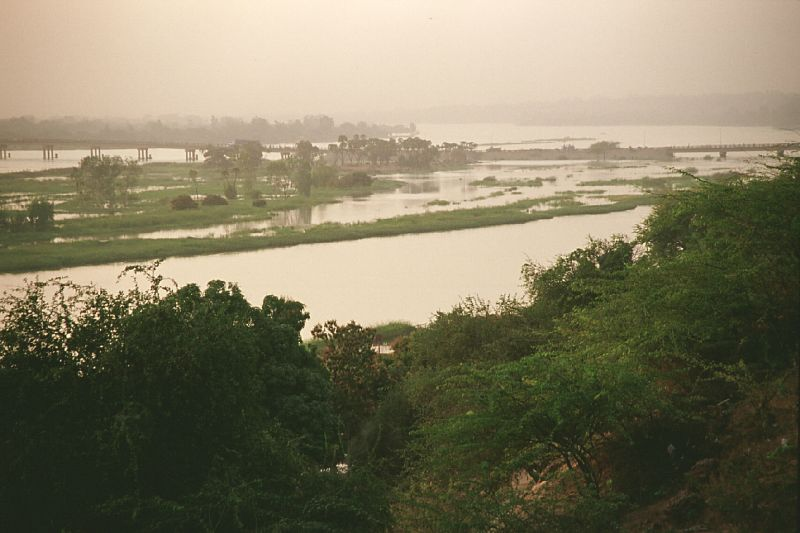
the Niger River from southern Niamey, with the Kennedy Bridge in the distance. Seasonally shallow and broken by rapids, the river is difficult for large boats to navigate.

The Niger River is navigable 300 km from Niamey to Gaya on the Benin frontier from mid-December to March. Thereafter, a series of falls and rapids rendered the Niger unnavigable in all seasons. In the navigable stretches, shallows prevent all but the small draft African canoes (Pirogues and Pinnases) from operating in many areas. There are four major bridges over the Niger, three in Niamey (The Kennedy Bridge, the Seyni Kountche Bridge and the Niger-Chinese friendship bridge the fourth at Bac Farie: plus the Niger River bridge at Gaya crosses into Benin.

Despite having no ocean or deep draft river ports, Niger does operate a port authority. Niger relies on the port at Cotonou (Benin), and to a lesser degree Lomé (Togo), and Port Harcourt (Nigeria), as its main route to overseas trade. Abidjan was in the process of regaining Niger's port trade, following the disruption of the Ivorian Civil War, beginning in 1999. Niger operates a Nigerien Ports Authority station, as well as customs and tax offices in a section of Cotonou's port, so that imports and exports can be directly transported between Gaya and the port. French Uranium mines in Arlit, which produce Niger's largest exports by value, travel through this port to France or the world market.

== Airports ==
The US government estimated there were 27 airports and/or landing strips in Niger as of 2007. Nine (9) of these had paved runways and 18 with unpaved landing strips. ICAO Codes for Niger are prefixed "DR".

Of the 9 Airports with paved runways, 2 with paved strips from 2,438 to 3,047 m: Diori Hamani International Airport and Mano Dayak International Airport. These are the only two Nigerien airports with regular international commercial flights. Six of the remainder have strips between 1,524 and 2,437 m, while one is under 914 m. 18 additional airports have unpaved runways 15 of them with strips between 914 and 1,523 m.

Major airports (with ICAO code and IATA code) include:

- DRRM (MFQ) – Maradi Airport – Maradi
- DRRN (NIM) – Diori Hamani International Airport – Niamey
- DRRT (THZ) – Tahoua Airport – Tahoua
- DRZA (AJY) – Mano Dayak International Airport – Agadez South
- DRZL (RLT) – Arlit Airport – Arlit
- DRZR (ZND) – Zinder Airport – Zinder
- DRZF () – Diffa Airport – Diffa
- DRZD () – Dirkou Airport – Dirkou
- DRRB (BKN) – Birni N'Konni Airport – Birni N'Konni

Other airstrips (with ICAO codes) include:

- DRRI Bilma
- DRRC Dogondoutchi
- DRRD Dosso
- DRRG Gaya
- DRZG Goure
- DRZI Iferouane
- DRRP La Tapoa
- DRZM Maine Soroa
- DRZN N'guigmi
- DRRU Ouallam
- DRZT Tanout
- DRRA Tessaoua
- DRRE Téra
- DRRL Tillabery
- DRRZ Tillia

== Railway ==
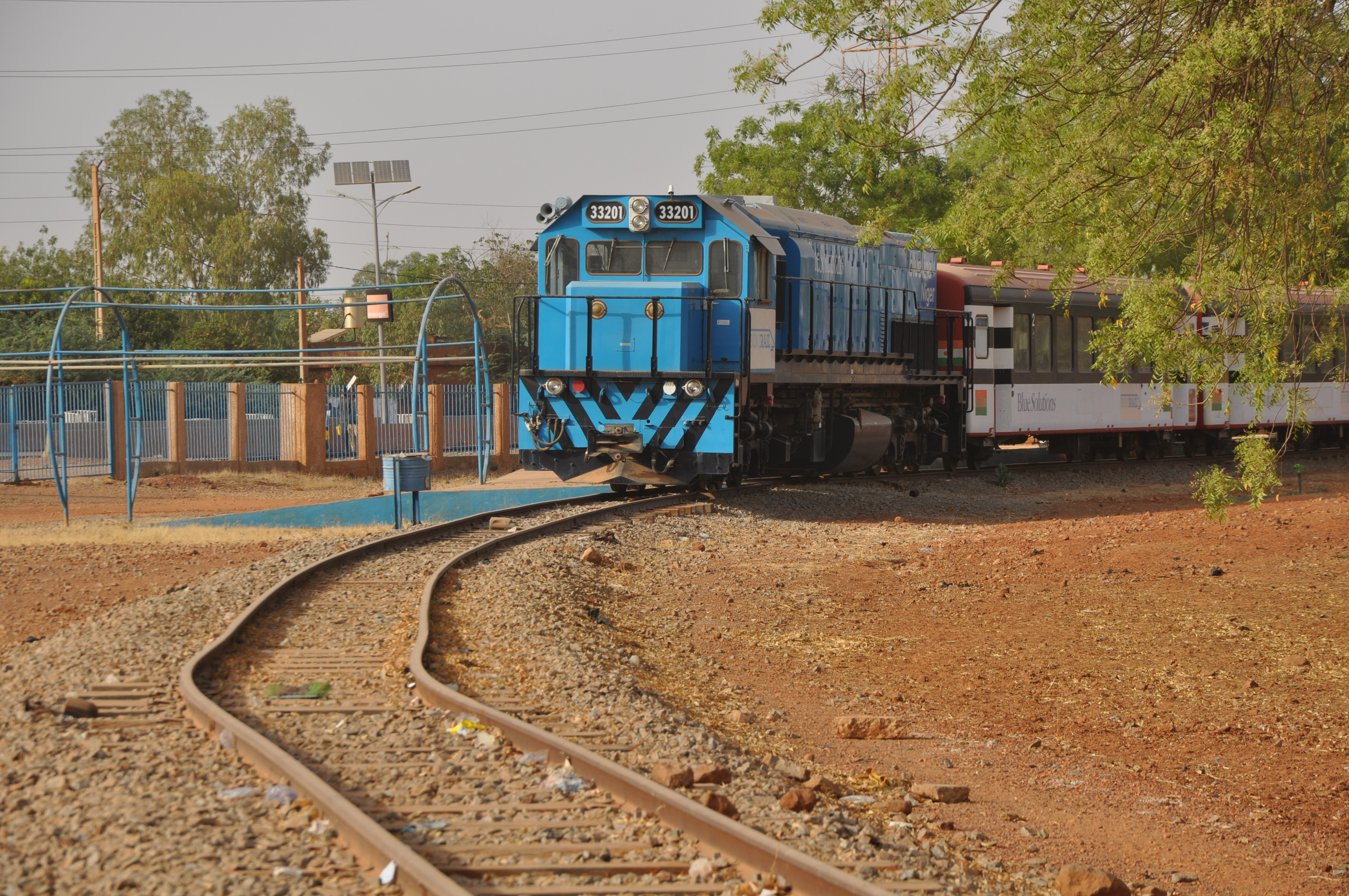
Niamey station

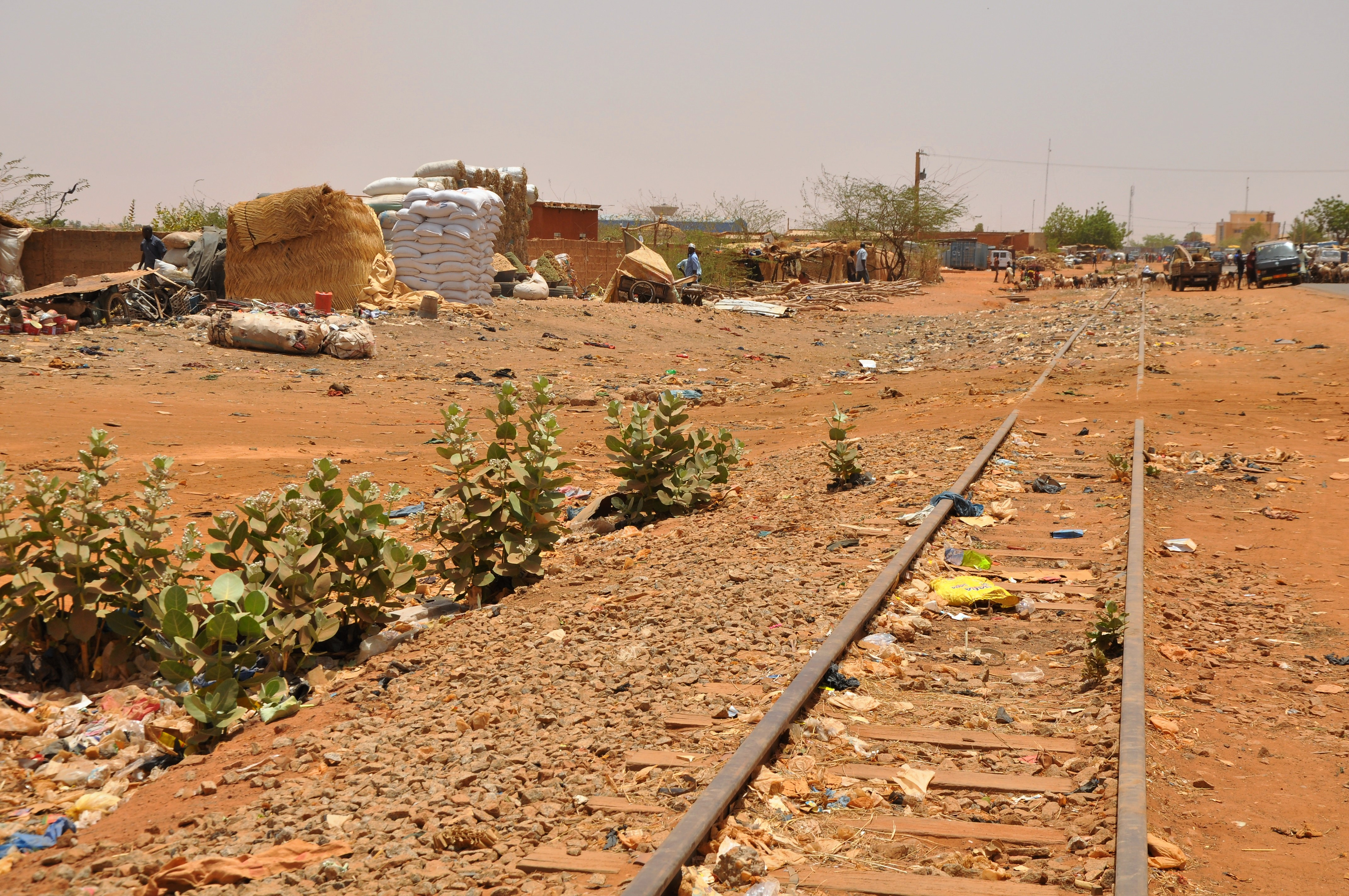
Railway Niamey-Dosso in the outskirts of Niamey

There are no operational railways in Niger.
Niger is a user of the Benin and Togo railway lines, which carry goods from seaports up to their endpoints, which are still hundreds of kilometers from the Niger border. Rail lines to Niamey and other points in Niger were proposed during the colonial period, and continue to be discussed. In 2012, a multi-national railway system was proposed to connect Benin, Niger, Burkina Faso and Ivory Coast.

In April 2014, Niamey Railway Station was officially inaugurated and construction began for the railway extension connecting Niamey to Cotonou via Parakou (Benin). The Niamey - Dosso stretch of this railway was built between 2014 and 2016 by the French Bolloré conglomerate. But competing commercial interests by several parties resulted in endless litigation and the connection to Benin never materialized. So the 145 km Niamey-Dosso stretch now lies orphaned and unused, with the tracks ending in the middle of nowhere some 6 km south of Dosso. Already in 2019, neglect caused the tracks to be damaged to such an extent in some places (mostly by rain/water), that they have become unusable. At the Niamey Terminus Station, the rails are kinked to such an extent by the summer heat that the train would not be able to leave the station (see image).

A rail connection from Maradi into Nigeria is being considered.

== See also ==
- Geography of Niger
- Seasonal migration in Niger
- Railway stations in Niger
- Railway stations in Benin
