= Gourou Banda Solar Power Station =

Solar farm in Niger

- Country: Niger
- Location: Gourou Banda, Commune V, Niamey
- Coordinates: 13°25′13″N 02°06′45″E
- Status: Under construction
- Construction began: 2021
- Commission date: August 2023 Expected
- Construction cost: US$34 million (Stage 1); $70 million (Stages 1&2)
- Owner: Government of Niger

Solar farm
- Type: Flat-panel PV

Power generation
- Nameplate capacity: 50 MW (67,000 hp)

The Gourou Banda Solar Power Station is a 50 MW (67,000 hp) solar power plant under construction in Niger. This renewable energy infrastructure project is under development by an independent power producer (IPP), under the build-own-operate-transfer (BOOT) model, with support from the International Finance Corporation (IFC), a member of the World Bank Group, as part of the bank's "Scaling Solar" program. The solar farm, first conceived in 2018, as a 20 megawatts installation, was expanded to capacity of 50 megawatts in 2020.

== Location ==
The solar farm sits adjacent to the existing 100 megawatts Gorou Banda Thermal Power Station, in Gorou Banda, in Commune V of the city of Niamey, the capital and largest city in the country. This is located on the southwest bank of River Niger, across the river from the central business district of the city, about 15 kilometres (9 mi) southeast of the Stade Général Seyni Kountché.

== Overview ==
As of September 2021, Niger's national generation capacity was reported as 284 megawatts, all of it derived from expensive "fossil fuels". The national electrification rate was 18.8 percent, in 2019, with the government of Niger aiming to raise that rate to 80 percent by 2035, with 30 percent of generating capacity derived from renewable sources.

The Gorou Banda Solar Plant represents the first grid-ready renewable energy source in the country. The electricity generated at this power station will be sold to Société Nigérienne d'Electricité (Nigelec), the electricity company of Niger. The World Bank's "Scaling Solar" program works in a complimentary manner to meet the goals of the stakeholders.

== Developers ==
In September 2021, the Government of Niger called for pre-qualification of eligible IPPs to tender for the construction of this power station. Interested IPPs had until 22 November 2021 to apply. IFC acted as advisor to the government of Niger, in this process.

In February 2022, six IPPs were selected in the first round to continue bidding for the rights to develop this power station. Those six winners are identified in the table below.

Winners of First Round of Bidding to Develop Gourou Banda Solar Power Station
Rank	IPP/Developer	Domicile	Notes
1	Scatec Solar	Norway	
2	Elsewedy Electric	Egypt	
3	Infinity Power Holding	Egypt	
4	GreenYellow	France	
5	Voltalia	France	
6	Nareva Holding	Morocco	

== Construction costs and funding ==
The construction costs were estimated at US$70 million in 2020. Two institutions have pledged financial support. The French Development Agency (AFD) has agreed to lend €23.5 million and the European Union has promised to lend €5 million towards this development.

== Developments ==
In July 2023, it was reported that the engineering, procurement and construction (EPC) contractor on the first phase of the project was a consortium comprising French companies Sogemcom and Akuo Energy. The solar farm is expected to reach commercial commissioning in August 2023.

== See also ==
- List of power stations in Niger
