= List of airlines of Niger =

This is a list of airlines currently operating in Niger:

Airline	Image	IATA	ICAO	Callsign	Commenced operations
Air Niamey		A7	AWN	AIR NIAMEY	2007
Escadrille Nationale du Niger					1978
Fly SkyJet			SJF	HARMATTAN	2016
Niger Air Cargo		NO	NAB	NIGER CARGO	2012
Niger Airlines		6N	NIN	NIGER AIRLINES	2014
Niger Airways		NJ	NWA	SOLEIL NIGER	2017
Tamara Niger Aviation			TMR	TAMARA	2012
THS Niger					2015

== See also ==
- List of defunct airlines of Niger
- List of airports in Niger
- List of companies based in Niger
