= List of defunct airlines of Niger =

This is a list of now defunct airlines from Niger.

Airline	Image	IATA	ICAO	Callsign	Commenced operations	Ceased operations	Notes
Aero Niger					1961	1966	To Air Niger
Aéroexpress			XPN		2007	2007	Operated Boeing 747
Air Nimey			AWN	AIR NIAMEY	?	?	
Air Niger		AW	AWM		1966	1993	
Air Inter Niger			AWH		2004	2006	
Arik Niger		Q9			2008	2009	Formed by Arik Ar, Nigeria. Started services in 8/08 postponed to 4/09, eventually cancelled.
Contact Air			CAN	GOBER AIR	?	?	
Equaflight Niger					2013	2013	
Massy Airlines		9M	MIH	MASSYLINE	?	?	
Max Air			MWN	MAX NIGER	?	?	
Nigeravia					1994	2000	Established as Transniger
Oasis Air			OGA	OASIS AIR	?	?	
Point Afrique Niger			PAZ	POINTAIR NIGER	2005	2006	Formed along with PointAir Burkina by 1996. Operated flights on behalf of French tour operators
Sahel Airlines			AWJ	SAHEL AIRLINES	1997	2006	
Transniger Avn					1968	1994	Operated Fairchild F-27

== See also ==
- List of airlines of Niger
- List of airports in Niger
