= Our Lady of Lourdes Church =

Our Lady of Lourdes Church may refer to:

== Asia ==
- Basilica of Our Lady of Lourdes, Poondi, Tamil Nadu, India
- National Shrine of Our Lady of Lourdes, Quezon City, Philippines
- Our Lady of Lourdes Chapel, Shamian Island, China
- Our Lady of Lourdes Church, Hosur, Tamil Nadu, India
- Our Lady of Lourdes Church, Kalyan, Maharashtra, India
- Our Lady of Lourdes Church, Kanajar, Karnataka, India
- Our Lady of Lourdes Church, Mianyang, China
- Our Lady of Lourdes Church, Rayakottai, Tamil Nadu, India
- Our Lady of Lourdes Church, Singapore
- Our Lady of Lourdes Church, Tiruchirappalli, Tamil Nadu, India
- Our Lady of Lourdes Parish Church (Bugallon), Philippines

== Europe ==
- Our Lady of Lourdes Church, Hednesford, Staffordshire, England
- Our Lady of Lourdes Church, Istanbul, Turkey
- Our Lady of Lourdes Church, Leeds, West Yorkshire, England
- Our Lady of Lourdes, Wanstead, London, England
- Sanctuary of Our Lady of Lourdes, the sanctuary in the shrine at Lourdes, France
- Sanctuary of the Beata Vergine di Lourdes, Reggio-Emilia, Italy

== North America ==
- Our Lady of Lourdes Catholic Church (Minneapolis, Minnesota), United States
- Our Lady of Lourdes Church (Manhattan), New York, United States
- Our Lady of Lourdes Church (Victoria, Texas), United States
- Our Lady of Lourdes Church Complex, Providence, Rhode Island, United States
- Our Lady of Lourdes Roman Catholic Church (Toronto), Canada

== South America ==
- Iglesia de Cristo Obrero y Nuestra Señora de Lourdes, Estación Atlántida, Uruguay
- Iglesia de Nuestra Señora de Lourdes y San Vicente Pallotti, Montevideo, Uruguay
- Iglesia de Nuestra Señora de Lourdes, Montevideo, Uruguay

== See also ==
- Our Lady of Lourdes School (disambiguation)
- Cathedral of Our Lady of Lourdes (disambiguation)
- Grotto of Our Lady of Lourdes, Notre Dame, Indiana, USA
- Our Lady of Lourdes, Marian veneration
