= Our Lady of Lourdes Cathedral =

Cathedral of Our Lady of Lourdes or Our Lady of Lourdes Cathedral may refer to:

- Cathedral of Our Lady of Lourdes (Canela), Brazil
- Cathedral of Our Lady of Lourdes (Spokane, Washington), United States
- Our Lady of Lourdes Cathedral, Daegu, South Korea
- Our Lady of Lourdes Cathedral, Florencia, Colombia
- Our Lady of Lourdes Cathedral, Maradi, Niger
- Our Lady of Lourdes Cathedral, Nakhon Ratchasima, Thailand
- Our Lady of Lourdes Metropolitan Cathedral, Thrissur

== See also ==
- Our Lady of Lourdes Church (disambiguation)
