= MFQ =

MFQ may refer to:

- Maradi Airport, Niger (by IATA code)
- Moba language, spoken in Togo (by ISO 639 code)
- Modern Folk Quartet (later Modern Folk Quintet), an American music group
