= SNTV (disambiguation) =

SNTV most often refers to the single non-transferable vote, a multi-member electoral system. SNTV can also mean:

== Television ==
- Sistema Nacional de Televisión (Nicaragua), the Nicaraguan state broadcaster from 1990 to 1997
- Sistema Nacional de Televisión (Paraguay), a Paraguayan broadcaster
- Société Nigérienne de Transports de Voyageurs, the Nigerien state transport company
- Somali National Television (SNTV), the national television station of Somalia

== Other ==
- Speak Now (Taylor's Version), 2023 re-recording of Taylor Swift's album Speak Now.
