= Niger Airlines =

Flag carrier of Niger

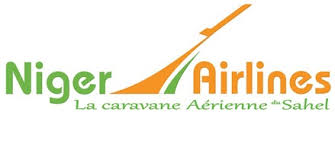
IATA	ICAO	Call sign
6N	NIN	NIGER AIRLINES
- Founded: 31 July 2012
- Commenced operations: 4 May 2014
- Hubs: Diori Hamani International Airport
- Fleet size: 1
- Destinations: 5
- Headquarters: Niamey, Niger
- Key people: Abdoul Aziz Larabou, CEO
- Website: nigerairlines.net

Niger Airlines is the Nigerien flag carrier headquartered in Niamey and based at Diori Hamani International Airport.

== History ==
The airline was founded in 2012 and started services in 2014 to replace defunct Air Niger. It commenced services with domestic operations connecting mining settlements as well as pilgrimage flights. In November 2022, Niger Airlines has been temporarily grounded by the Nigerien authorities citing safety concerns. Since December 2023 the airline uses an ATR-72 aircraft (5T-CSD) for their flights.

== Destinations ==
Niger Airlines currently serves the following domestic destinations:

Country	City	Airport	Status
Niger	Agadez	Mano Dayak International Airport	
Niger	Diffa	Diffa Airport	
Niger	Maradi	Maradi Airport	
Niger	Niamey	Diori Hamani International Airport	Hub
Niger	Zinder	Zinder Airport	

== Fleet ==
=== Current fleet ===
As of November 2022, the Niger Airlines fleet consisted of the following aircraft:

Aircraft	In service	Orders	Passengers	Notes
ATR-72	1	-	-	
Total	1	—		
