= List of power stations in Niger =

The following page lists all power stations in Niger.

== Hydroelectric ==
Hydroelectric station	Region supplied	Type	Capacity	Year completed	Name of reservoir	River
Kandadji Hydropower Station	Tillabery Region; Niamey Urban Community; Dosso Region	Reservoir	130 MW	2017 (expected)		Niger River

== Thermal ==
Thermal power station	Region supplied	Fuel type	Capacity	Year completed	Name of Owner	Notes
Anou Araren Thermal Power Station	Agadez Region	Coal	2 x 18.8 MW	1981	SONICHAR; NIGELEC	Operational. Power is supplied to the uranium mining companies in Agadez (Somair and Cominak) as well as the rest of the region of Agadez
Niamey I Thermal Power Station	Niamey Urban Community	Diesel fuel			NIGELEC	Operational
Niamey II (Goudel) Thermal Power Station	Niamey Urban Community	Diesel fuel			NIGELEC	Operational
Gorou Banda Thermal Power Station	Communities along Niger river: Niamey Urban Community; Dosso Region; Tillabery Region	Diesel fuel	100 MW	2014 (expected)	NIGELEC	Under construction
Malbaza Thermal Power Station	Malbaza	Diesel fuel			NIGELEC	Operational
Zinder Thermal Power Station	Zinder Region	Diesel fuel			NIGELEC	Operational
SORAZ Thermal Power Station	Zinder Region; Maradi Region; Tahoua Region	Diesel fuel	54 MW	2011	SORAZ	Operational. Funding secured for construction of high voltage connection lines to the grid in Zinder as of 2014
Salkadamna Thermal Power Station	Tahoua Region; Niamey Urban Community	Coal	200 MW	Awaiting funding approval and construction as of 2012	NIGELEC	Feasibility technical studies are completed. Securing funding with EXIMBANK as 2012

- NIGELEC = Société Nigerienne d’Electricité - The state utility responsible for electricity in Niger.

== See also ==
- List of power stations in Africa
- List of largest power stations in the world
- Energy in Niger
