= Dan Dicko Dankoulodo University of Maradi =

University in Maradi, Niger

- Université Dan Dicko Dankoulodo de Maradi
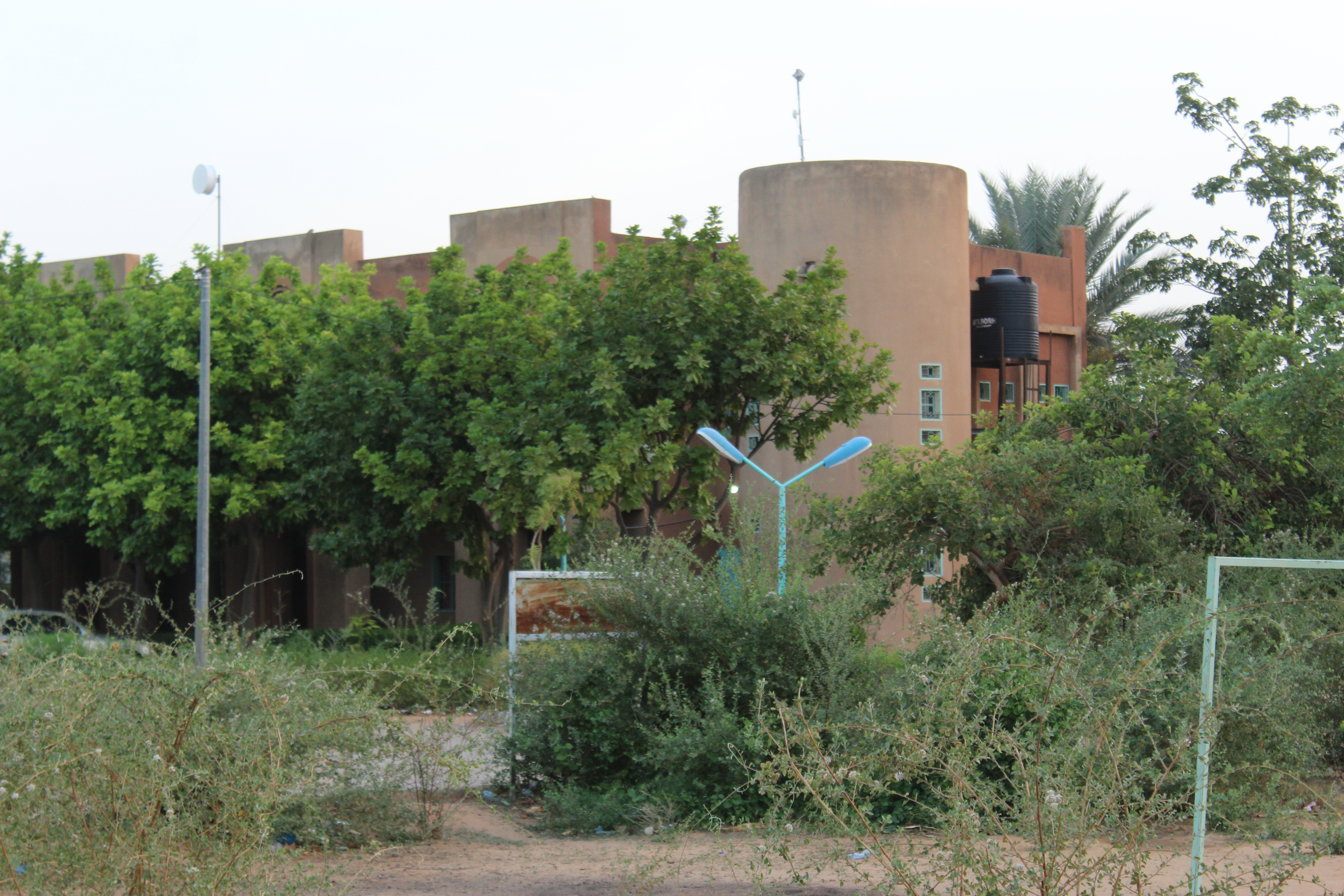
- Motto: ilimi Tarmamua
- Type: Public university
- Established: 2008
- Vice-Chancellor: Dr. SAIDOU Adamou, Maître Assistant
- Rector: Dr. SANI Mamane, Maître de Conférences
- Academic staff: 87
- Students: 3,814 (2020–2021)
- Location: Maradi, Niger; 13°29′34″N 7°07′46″E
- Language: French
- Website: www.uddm.edu.ne

The Dan Dicko Dankoulodo University of Maradi (UDDM) is a Nigerien university located in Maradi. It started in 2008 with a university institute of technology (IUT).

In 2020, UDDM had a staff of 87 teachers, including 65 teacher-researchers and 22 technology teachers, 70 technical support staff (PAT), and 3,814 students, including 713 female students.

== History ==
Dan Dicko Dankoulodo University of Maradi was established by law No. 2014–49 on 16 October 2014, following the modification of Maradi University, which was created by ordinance No. 2010–40 on 1 July 2010, and modified by ordinance No. 2010-079 on 9 December 2010. The training structures consist of three faculties, a university institute of technology, and joint research units.

== Courses offered ==
- Two-year degree courses: University Diploma of Technology (DUT);
- Three-year degree courses: Professional License (License or Bachelor of Science);
- Five-year degree courses: Professional and Research master's degrees: Master (or Master of Science);
- Eight-year degree courses: Doctorate: PhD and Medicine

== Components ==
=== University Institute of Technology (IUT) ===
The University Institute of Technology of Maradi opened its doors in the 2008–2009 academic year. It offers training leading to professional insertion after two to three years of study (DUT and Professional License). With 22 technology teachers (as of 2016), the Institute consists of three departments:

- Department of Electrical engineering
- Department of Mechanical Engineering
- Department of Civil Engineering

=== Faculty of Science and Technology (FST) ===
The Faculty of Science and Technology at Dan Dicko Dankoulodo University of Maradi began its activities in the 2010–2011 academic year. It is divided into various departments:

- Department of Physics (with a focus on renewable energy – RE)
- Department of Chemistry
- Department of Biology
- Department of Geology
- Department of Mathematics (MP, MI)

=== Faculty of Agricultural Sciences and Environment (FASE) ===
Started in the 2011–2012 academic year, the Faculty of Agricultural Sciences and the Environment at Dan Dicko Dankoulodo University of Maradi is also subdivided into various departments:

- Department of Plant Production
- Department of Soil and Remote Sensing
- Department of Animal Production
- Department of Rural Engineering and Water & Forests
- Department of Fundamental Sciences
- Department of Rural Sociology and Economics

=== Faculty of Health Sciences (FSS) ===
Started in the 2014–2015 academic year, the Faculty of Health Science at Dan Dicko Dankoulodo University of Maradi is also subdivided into various departments:

- Department of Medicine
- Department of Pharmacy

=== Joint Research Units (UMR) ===
To make scientific research operational, the university has established joint research units (UMR) and a technological innovation platform (PIT):

- UMR DAP: Plant Diversity and Adaptation
- UMR ECODYV: Ecology and Vegetation Dynamics
- UMR BIOSTE: Environmental Biosurveillance and Toxicology
- UMR SEEFS: Livestock Systems and Wildlife Ecology
- UMR DDSACC: Sustainable Development, Societies, and Adaptation to Climate Change
- UMR MIA: Mathematics, Computer Science, and Applications
- UMR RE: Renewable energy
- UMR SERMUG: Water Sciences, Mineral Resources, Use and Management
- PIT: Technological Innovation Platform

== International relations ==
Dan Dicko Dankoulodo University of Maradi cooperates with several national and international institutions, including:

- Nigerien universities
- Umaru Musa Yar'adua University, Katsina, Nigeria
- Bayero University, Kano, Nigeria
- Ahmadu Bello University (ABU), Zaria, Nigeria
- Usmanu Danfodiyo University, Sokoto, Nigeria
- Abubakar Tafawa Balewa University, Bauchi, Nigeria
- University of Abomey-Calavi in Benin
- Cheikh Anta Diop University in Dakar, Senegal
- University of Valladolid in Spain

The degrees awarded by UDDM are recognized by the CAMES.
