= Our Lady of Lourdes Church, Kalyan =

Catholic church in Kalyan, Mumbai, India

Our Lady of Lourdes Church
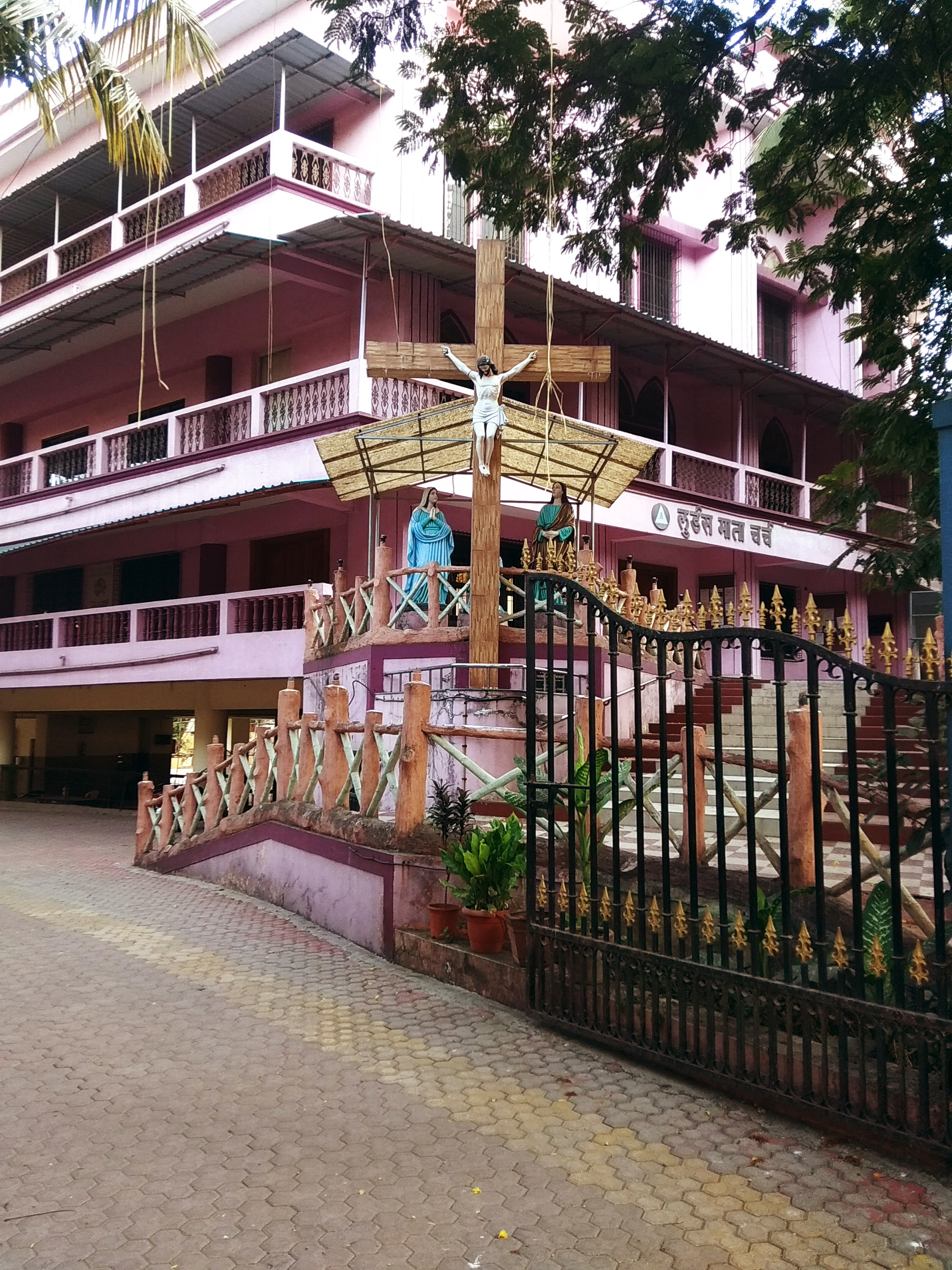
- view of church
- Our Lady of Lourdes Church
- Location: Murbad Road, Kalyan west, Maharashtra, India
- Country: India
- Denomination: Roman Catholic
- Website: "ollourdes-kalyanwest". archdioceseofbombay.org.

History
- Dedication: Our Lady of Lourdes

Architecture
- Functional status: Active

Administration
- District: Thane district
- Diocese: Roman Catholic Archdiocese of Bombay

Clergy
- Priest: Fr Simon Dsouza

Our Lady of Lourdes is a Catholic church located in Kalyan West, Thane district, Maharashtra. This church is one of the oldest in the Roman Catholic Archdiocese of Bombay and was rebuilt after years. The church also operates the Lourdes High School and Junior College.

== See also ==
- List of parishes of the Roman Catholic Archdiocese of Bombay
- Our Lady of Lourdes Church
- Lourdes apparitions
