= Diffa Airport =

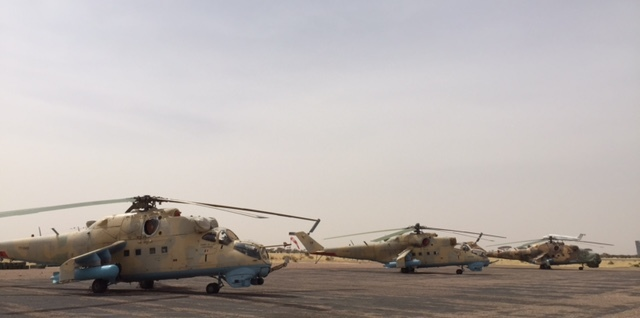
- Helicopters at Diffa Airport
- IATA: none; ICAO: DRZF

Summary
- Airport type: Public
- Owner: Government
- Location: Diffa, Niger
- Elevation AMSL: 994 ft / 303 m
- Coordinates: 13°22′20″N 12°37′30″E

Map
- Location of the airport in Niger

Runways
Direction	Length		Surface
Direction	m	ft	Surface
09/27	1,900	6,234	Asphalt
- Sources: GCM Google Maps

Diffa Airport (ICAO: DRZF) is an airport serving Diffa, a town in the extreme southeast of Niger, near the border with Nigeria.

The airport is in the desert 6 kilometres (3.7 mi) north of Diffa. The runway has an additional 800 metres (2,600 ft) unpaved overrun on the east end.

== Airlines and destinations ==
Airlines	Destinations
Niger Airlines	Niamey (suspended)

== See also ==
- Transport in Niger
- List of airports in Niger
