= Société Nigérienne de Transports de Voyageurs =

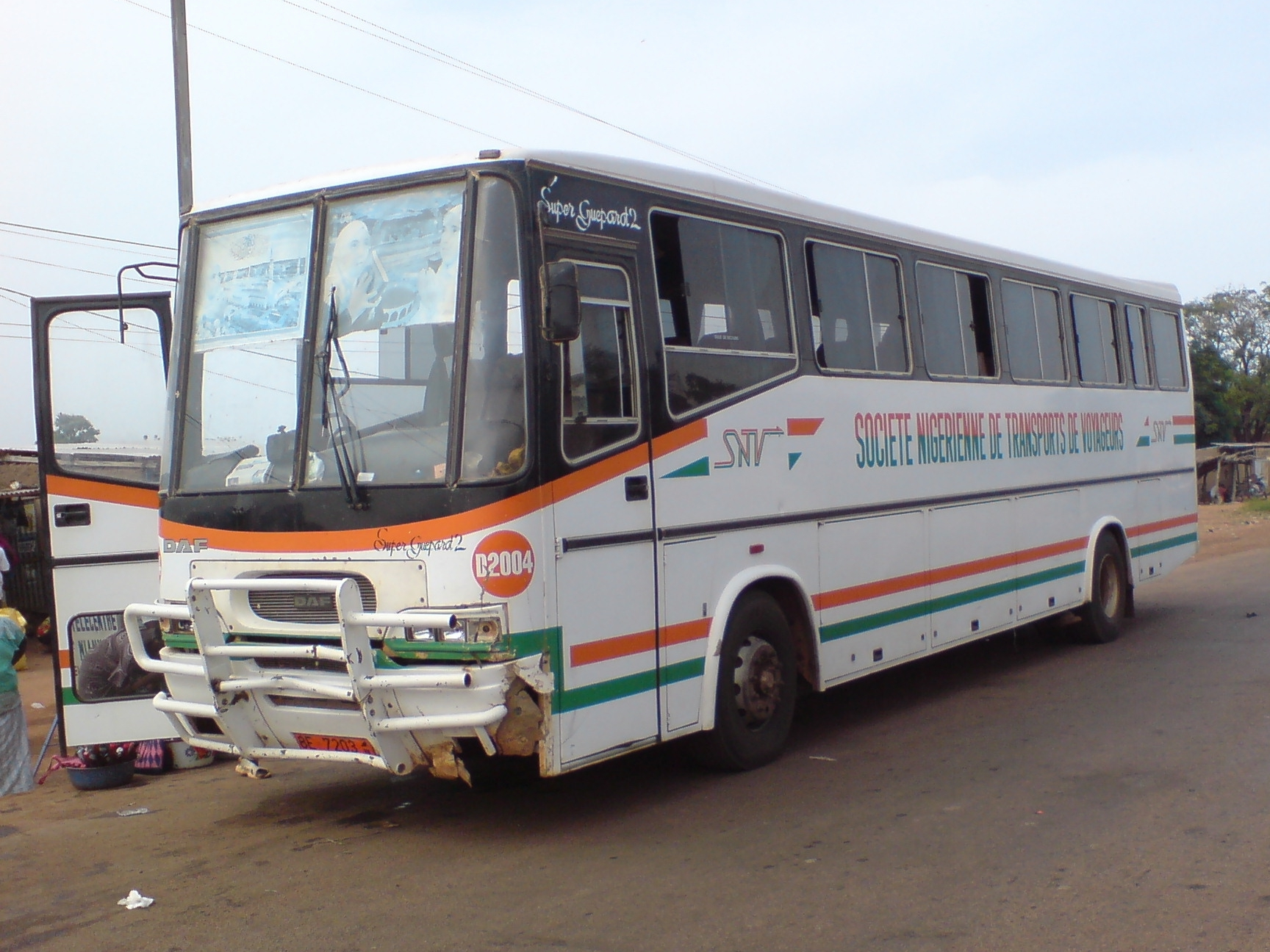
- SNTV coach running between Ouagadougou, Burkina Faso and Niamey, Niger.
- Parent: Nigerien Ministry of Transport
- Founded: 1964
- Headquarters: Siège Social; Zone Industrielle de Gamkalley; BP: 167 Niamey (Niger)
- Service area: Niger, Neighbouring countries
- Service type: Intercity bus service
- Destinations: Niamey, Ouagadougou,N'Djamena
- Chief executive: Ibrahim Iddi Ango
- Website: sntv.biz

The Société Nigérienne de Transports de Voyageurs or SNTV (English: Nigerien Passenger Transport Company) is the Nigerien government owned bus and public transport company.

== Operation ==
The SNTV operates an inter-city and limited international coach system, as well as the "Gare Routieres" or "Autogares": Coach, truck, and taxi stations found in most Nigerien cities. In a nation with no rail system and low automobile ownership, SNTV and private coaches, buses, and taxis are the primary means of intracity travel for most Nigeriens.

== History ==
The SNTV was hived off from the older STNN in the mid-1960s. The STNN sense focuses on commercial cargo haulage, but the SNTV still maintains a package service, while the STNN transport passengers in some more remote routes.

As of 2009, the United States government reports that SNTV "has experienced no known major accidents since 2001."

== Routes ==
Domestic service routes:

- Niamey – Maradi – Zinder
- Niamey – Tahoua – Agadez - Arlit
- Zinder – Agadez – Arlit
- Zinder – Diffa – N'guigmi

International service routes:

- Niamey – Cotonou – Lomé – Accra
- Niamey – Ouagadougou
- Niamey – Bamako
- Niamey – Gao

== See also ==
- Transport in Niger
