= SONIDEP =

State-owned oil company of Niger

Société Nigérienne des Produits Pétroliers
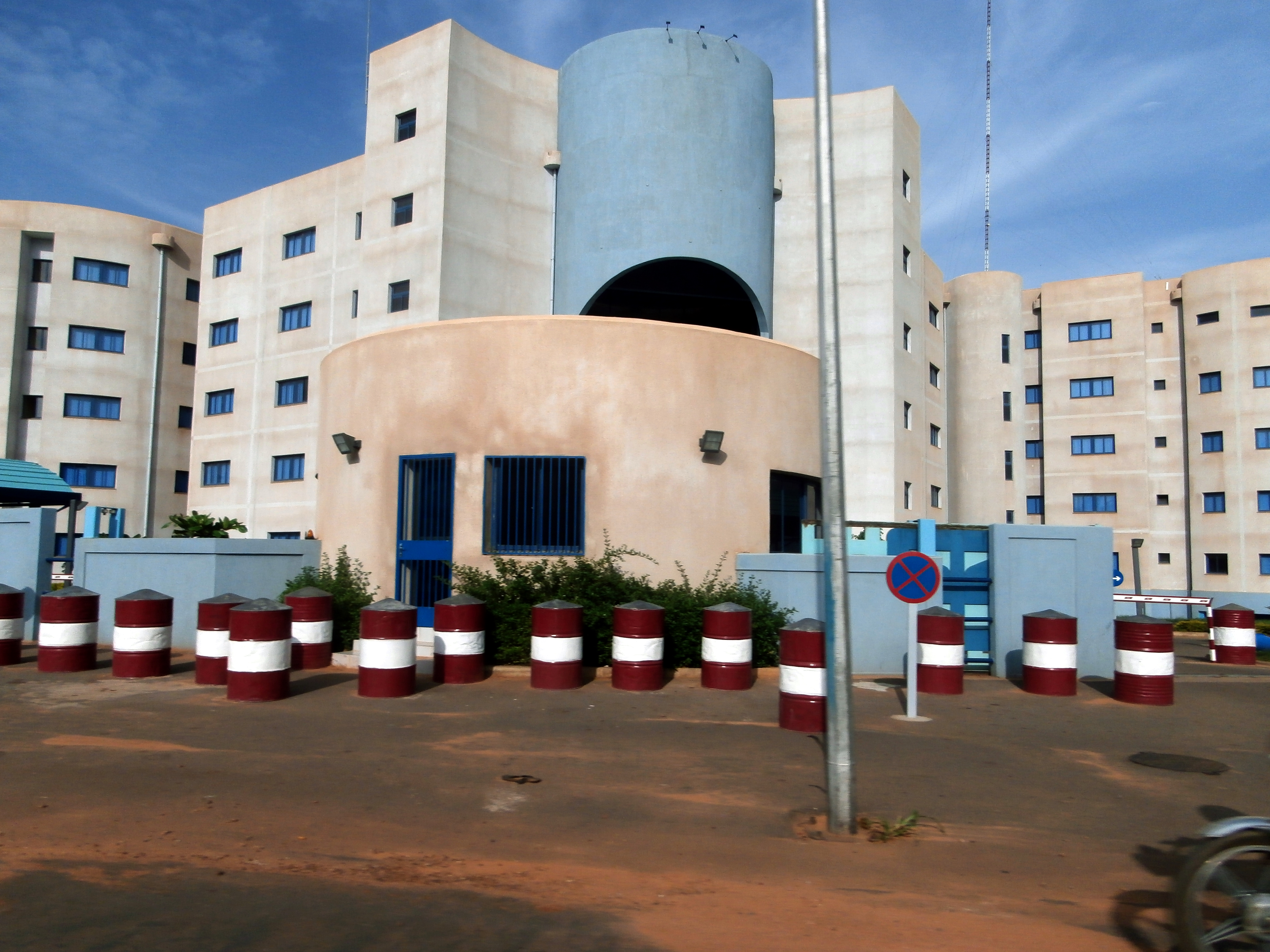
- Type: State-owned
- Industry: Oil industry
- Founded: 1977
- Headquarters: Niamey, Niger
- Key people: Hamidou Sekou (President)
- Products: Petroleum products
- Revenue: $183,265,000 (2007)
- Number of employees: 154
- Website: https://itieniger.ne/sonidep/

SONIDEP (French: Société Nigérienne des Produits Pétroliers, literally: Nigerien Petroleum Products Company) is a parastatal corporation in Niger. Founded by government decree in 1977, SONIDEP is responsible for the importation, transportation, storage, refining and marketing of petroleum products in Niger. It operates retail sales stations for automobiles and fuel oil throughout the nation.

Recently, the government of Niger has considered privatizing SONIDEP, with the assistance of the World Bank, but the company has remained state-owned due to a lack of interest among investors, and plans for privatization are now "on hold indefinitely."

The capital of SONIDEP, 1 billion CFA francs, is wholly owned by the Nigerien state. The organization formerly placed under the supervision of the Minister of Commerce was placed under the supervision of the Minister of Petroleum during a Council of Ministers dated March 13, 2020.

== See also ==
- Petroleum industry in Niger
- NIGELEC
