= Our Lady of Lourdes School =

Our Lady of Lourdes School may refer to several schools:

== United States ==
- Our Lady of Lourdes Academy, Miami, Florida
- Our Lady of Lourdes Catholic School (Bethesda, Maryland)
- Our Lady of Lourdes High School, Poughkeepsie, New York
- Our Lady of Lourdes Regional School, Northumberland County, Pennsylvania
- Our Lady of Lourdes School, Louisville, Kentucky, see List of schools of the Roman Catholic Archdiocese of Louisville
- Our Lady of Lourdes Elementary School, near Porcupine, South Dakota, a part of Red Cloud Indian School.

== Other places ==
- Our Lady of Lourdes High School, Ballymoney, County Antrim, Northern Ireland
- Our Lady of Lourdes Catholic High School (Guelph, Ontario), Canada
- Our Lady of Lourdes College Mankon, Cameroon
- Our Lady Of Lourdes Catholic School (Kingston, Ontario)
