= Our Lady of Lourdes Cathedral, Maradi =

Our Lady of Lourdes Cathedral
- Cathédrale Notre Dame de Lourdes de Maradi
- Our Lady of Lourdes Cathedral
- Location: Maradi
- Country: Niger
- Denomination: Roman Catholic Church

The Our Lady of Lourdes Cathedral (French: Cathédrale Notre Dame de Lourdes de Maradi) or simply Cathedral of Maradi, is a Roman Catholic cathedral in the town of Maradi, the third largest city in the African country of Niger.

== History ==
It began as a parish church which was formally established on 10 April 1954. It follows the Roman or Latin rite and serves as the seat of the diocese of Maradi (Dioecesis Maradensis) which was created in 2001 by Pope John Paul II by bull "Summa diligentia" and is a suffragan of the Archdiocese of Niamey. It is under the pastoral responsibility of the Bishop Ambroise Ouédraogo.

The cathedral temporarily ceased its regular activities in January 2015 after attacks on churches that occurred in the country after the cartoons published by Charlie Hebdo.

== See also ==
- Roman Catholicism in Niger
- Our Lady of Lourdes Cathedral, Daegu
