= Sanctuary of the Beata Vergine di Lourdes =

Church building in Montericco, Italy

Coordinates: 44.6120°N 10.6095°E

The Sanctuary of the Beata Vergine di Lourdes is a Neoclassical-style, Roman Catholic church, a marian sanctuary, located on Via Don A. Barigazzi #3, in the frazione of Montericco, outside of the town of Albinea, province of Reggio Emilia, region of Emilia Romagna, Italy.

== History ==
Documentation exists for a church at this site circa the year 1000 affiliated with the Benedictine order. However, the structure, dedicated to San Martino di Bazano had been reduced to an oratory by the 16th-century, and fallen into great disrepair. By 1665, the structure was deconsecrated.

However from 1896 to 1898, using designs by the engineer Carlo Barbieri, a temple dedicated to the Blessed Immaculate Virgin of Lourdes was erected in Lombard-Gothic Revival style. It has a single nave and four side chapels; the bell-tower and presbytery were subsequently added. The scenic bell tower was added, together with a new presbytery.
