= Commune V (Niamey) =

Coordinates: 13°30′05″N 2°05′55″E

- Commune
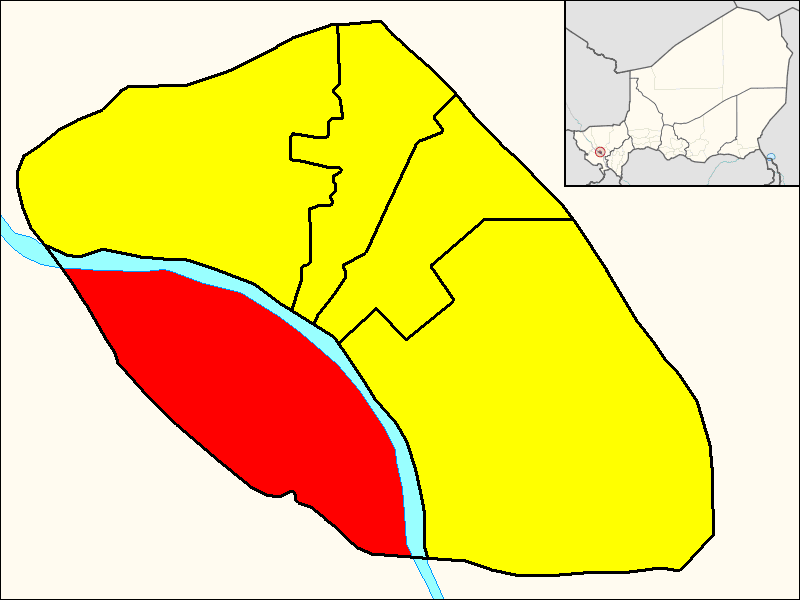
- Commune V within Niamey
- Country: Niger
- Region: Niamey
- Time zone: UTC+1 (WAT)

Commune V, also known as Niamey V, is an urban commune in Niger. It is a commune of the capital city of Niamey. It is located in the south-western shore of the Niger River.

== Quartiers and villages ==
Niamey V contains 11 quartiers:

- Banga Bana
- Diamweye
- Gawèye
- Karadjé
- Lamordé
- Néni Goungou
- Kirkissoye
- Kossey
- Nogaré
- Nordiré
- Pont Kennedy

It contains 8 villages:

- Ganguel
- Gorou Kirey
- Gorou Banda
- Kourtéré Boubacar
- Kourtéré Sambero
- Saga Gourma
- Saguia
- Timéré
