= Tahoua Airport =

Airport in Niger

- IATA: THZ; ICAO: DRRT

Summary
- Airport type: Public
- Serves: Tahoua
- Elevation AMSL: 1,270 ft (390 m)
- Coordinates: 14°52′30″N 5°15′50″E

Map
- Location of the airport in Niger

Runways
Direction	Length		Surface
Direction	m	ft	Surface
06/24	2,156	7,075	Asphalt
- Source: Google Maps

Tahoua Airport (IATA: THZ, ICAO: DRRT) is an airport serving Tahoua, Niger.

== History ==
In 2022, a military drone base was added to the airport. On 8 March 2026, militants attacked the airport. Several attackers were killed, and five were arrested.

== See also ==
- Transport in Niger
