= Escadrille Nationale du Niger =

Nigerien airline

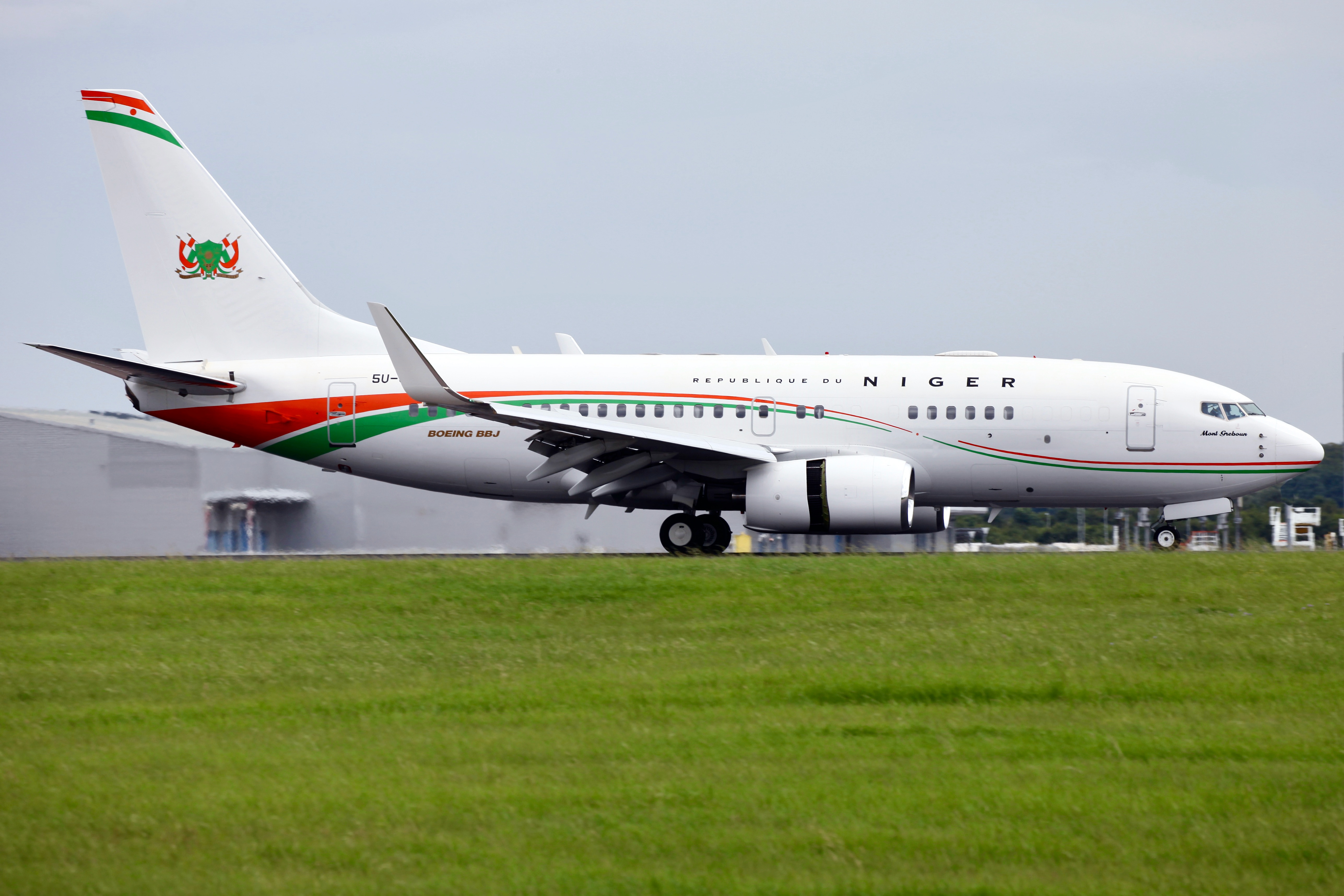
IATA	ICAO	Call sign
-	NGR	NIGER
- Hubs: Diori Hamani International Airport
- Fleet size: 1
- Parent company: Government of Niger
- Headquarters: Niamey, Niger

Escadrille Nationale du Niger is the governmental airline of Niger based at Diori Hamani International Airport in Niamey.

== Fleet ==
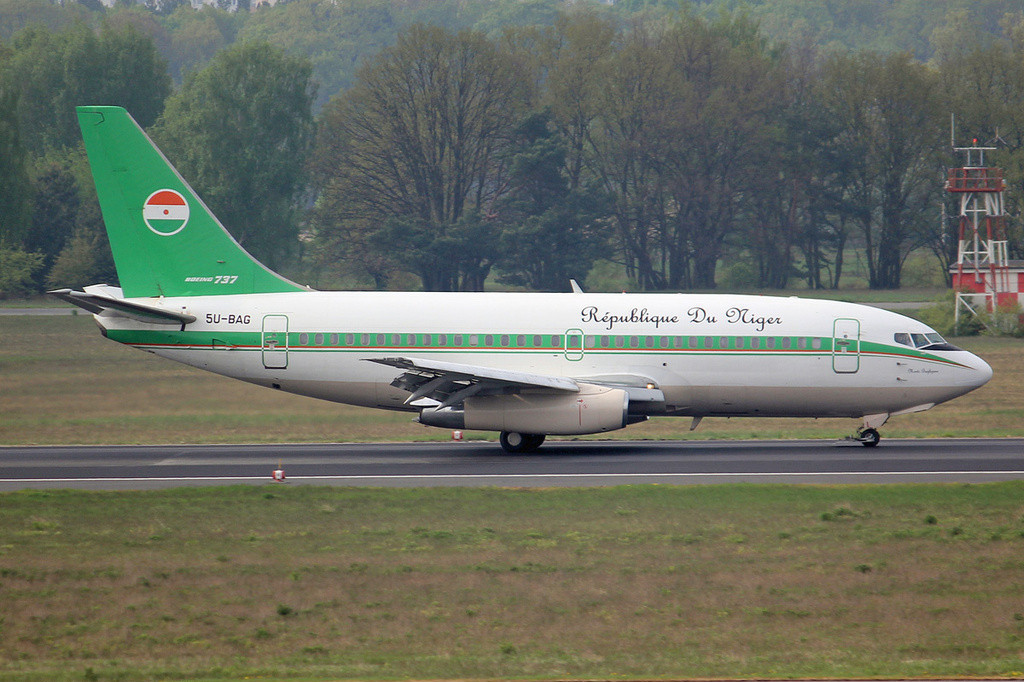
The airline's former Boeing 737-200, pictured in 2013.

=== Current fleet ===
The Escadrille Nationale du Niger fleet consists of the following aircraft (as of August 2017):

- 1 Boeing BBJ

=== Former fleet ===
The airline's fleet previously included the following aircraft (as of 19 July 2009) :

- 1 Boeing 737-200
