= Maradi Airport =

Airport in Niger

- IATA: MFQ; ICAO: DRRM

Summary
- Airport type: Public
- Serves: Maradi, Niger
- Elevation AMSL: 1,240 ft / 378 m
- Coordinates: 13°30′10″N 7°07′30″E

Map
- Location of the airport in Niger

Runways
| Direction | Length | | Surface |
| Direction | m | ft | Surface |
|---|---|---|---|
| 08/26 | 1,850 | 6,070 | Asphalt |
- Source: Google Maps SkyVector

Maradi Airport (IATA: MFQ, ICAO: DRRM) is an airport serving Maradi, Niger. The airport is on the east side of the city.

The Maradi non-directional beacon (Ident: MY) is located on the field.

== Airlines and destinations ==
| Airlines | Destinations |
|---|---|
| Niger Airlines | Niamey (suspended) |

== See also ==
- Transport in Niger
- List of airports in Niger
