= Zinder Airport =

Zinder International Airport Aéroport international de Zinder
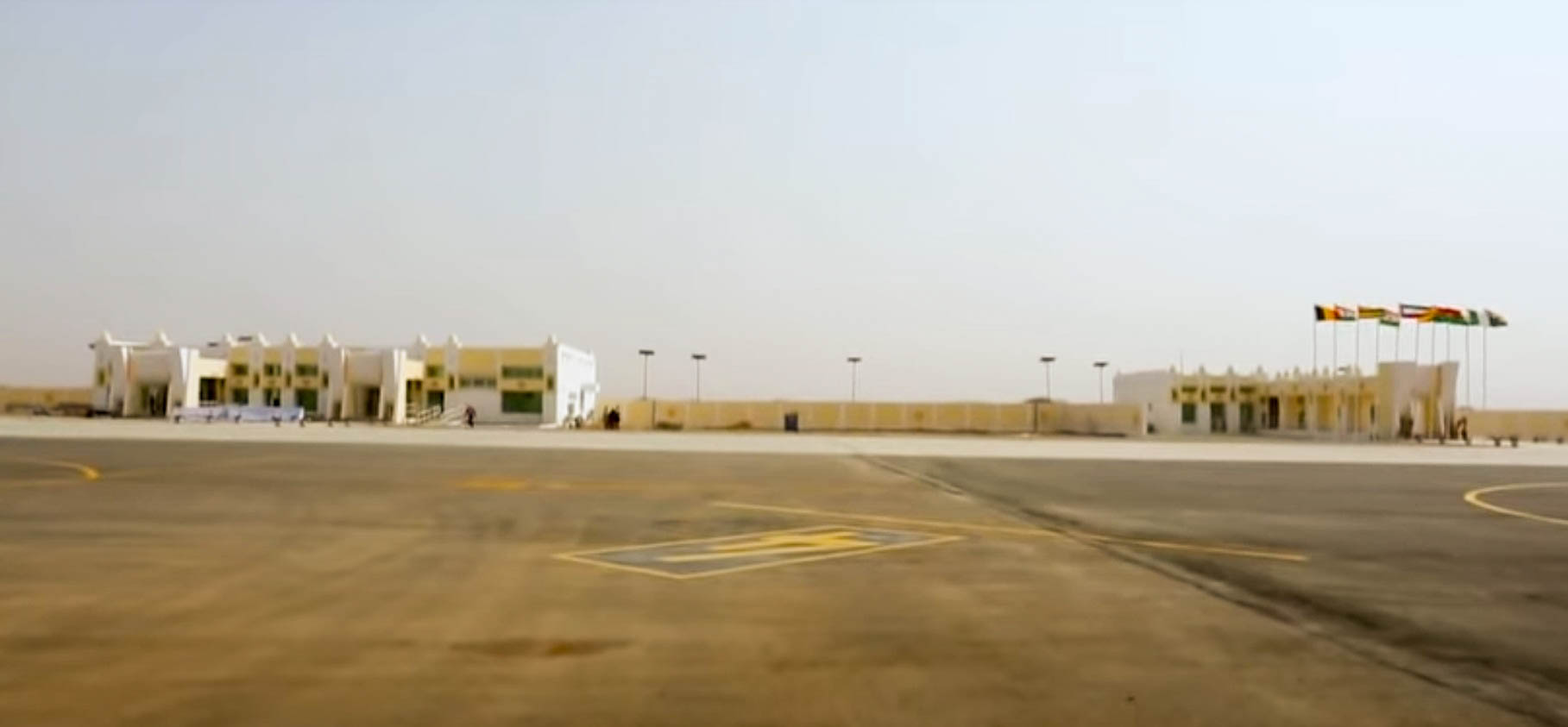
- IATA: ZND; ICAO: DRZR

Summary
- Airport type: Public
- Owner: Government
- Operator: ASECNA
- Location: Zinder, Niger
- Elevation AMSL: 1,509 ft / 460 m
- Coordinates: 13°46′44″N 08°59′02″E

Map
- Location of Airport in Niger

Runways
Direction	Length		Surface
Direction	ft	m	Surface
05/23	5,988	1,825	Asphalt

Zinder International Airport (IATA: ZND, ICAO: DRZR) is a civil airport serving Zinder, Niger. Owned and formerly managed by the Agence nationale de l'aviation civile du Niger, since 11 February 2020 it has been managed by the Agency for Aerial Navigation Safety in Africa and Madagascar. Although it is called an "international airport", it generally only handles domestic flights by Niger Airlines that link it to the Diori Hamani International Airport in the capital Niamey, from which several African airports and Paris can be accessed. Cargo is delivered ad hoc. It consists of a single 1,825-meter asphalt track. As of 2018, Zinder Airport handled 30 flights and 2,500 passengers annually.

== Airlines and destinations ==
Airlines	Destinations
Niger Airlines	Niamey (suspended)
