= Mano Dayak International Airport =

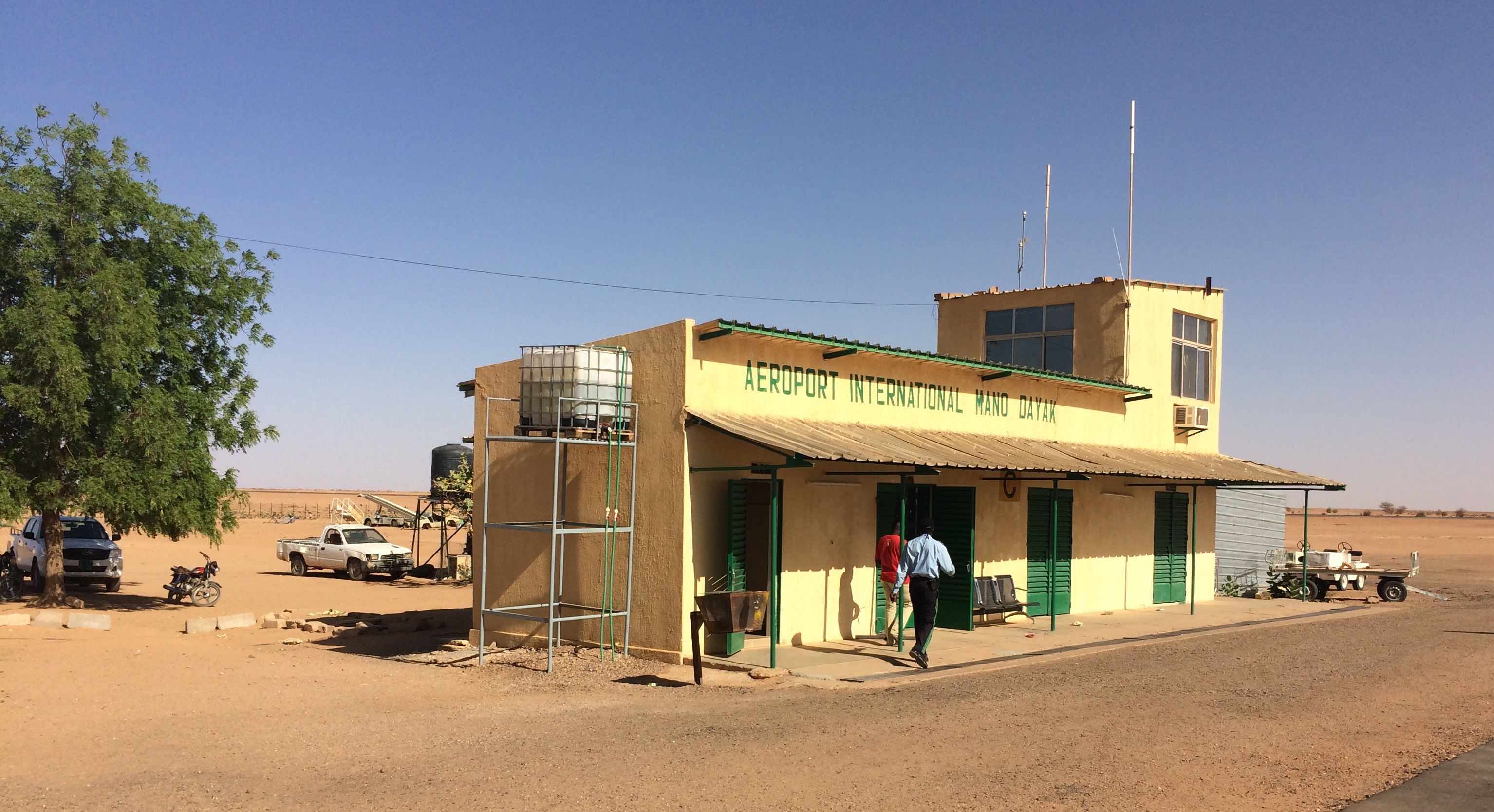
- IATA: AJY; ICAO: DRZA

Summary
- Airport type: Public
- Owner: Government
- Location: Agadez, Niger
- Elevation AMSL: 1,660 ft (510 m)
- Coordinates: 16°57′57.59″N 8°0′0.41″E

Map
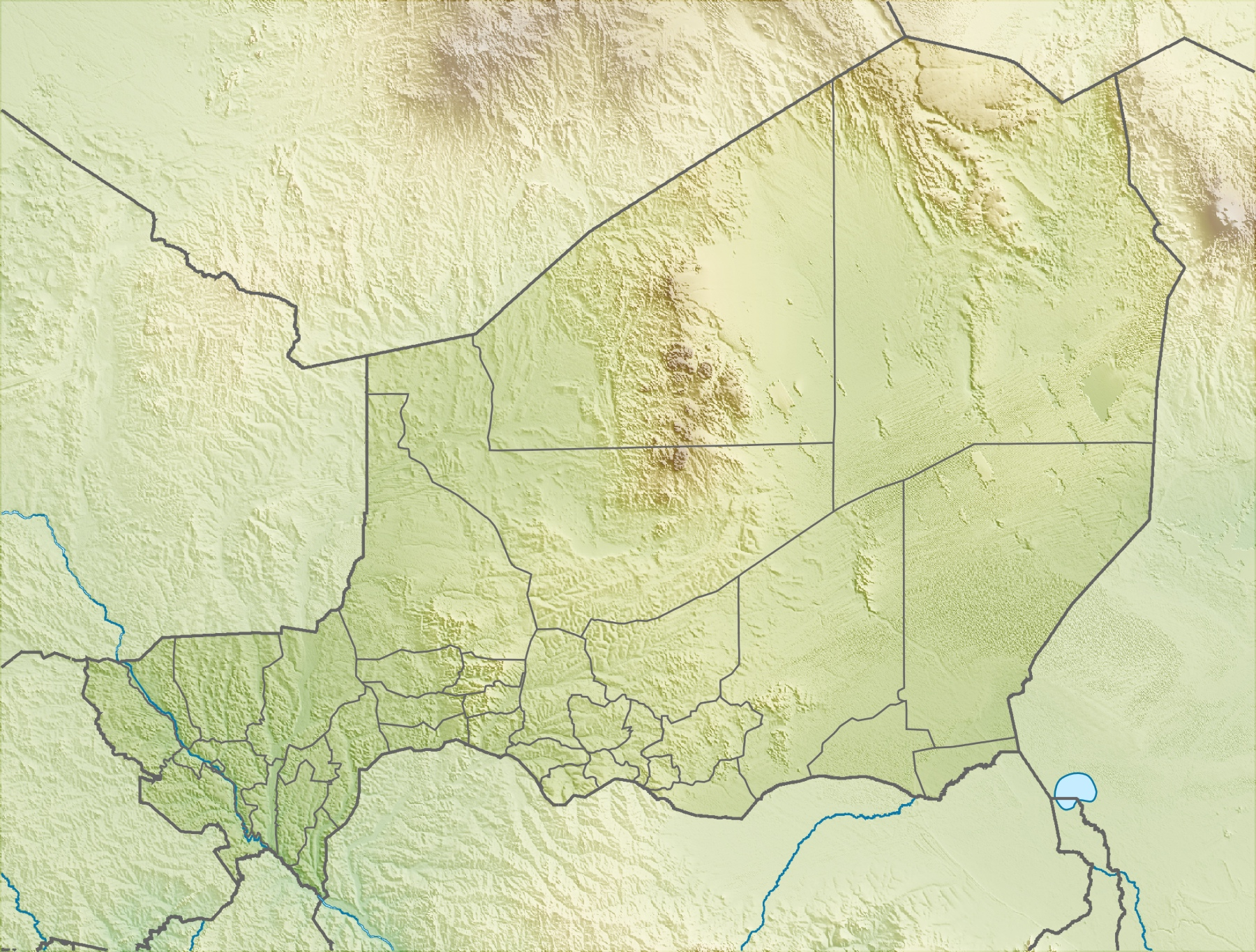
- Location within Niger

Runways
Direction	Length		Surface
Direction	ft	m	Surface
07/25	9,843	3,000	Asphalt

Mano Dayak International Airport (IATA: AJY, ICAO: DRZA) is an airport in Agadez in the Sahara desert in Niger. It is named after Mano Dayak, a Tuareg leader.

== Geography ==
Agadez is in the Agadez region in North-East Niger.

Niger Airlines operated flights to Niamey, the country's capital. Air Libya once provided flights to Tripoli in Libya.

== See also ==
- Nigerien Air Base 201, a US drone base around 3 km to the south
