= NIGELEC =

Nigerien electrical utility

NIGELEC (Société Nigérienne d'Electricité, Nigerien Electricity Society) is the Parastatal electric power generation and transmission utility in Niger. It is majority owned by the Government of Niger and was founded in 1968. In 2006 NIGELEC had 178964 subscribers and 300 electrified centers. The NIGELEC management is overseen by the Ministry of Mines and Energy.

NIGELEC operates four power plants: Niamey I and Niamey II (in Niamey proper and the suburb of Goudel), the Malbaza Power Station (at Malbaza, near Tahoua) and the Zinder & Maradi Thermal Power Station (near Zinder).

70% of Niger's electricity typically comes from Nigeria. In the aftermath of the 2023 Nigerien coup d'état, Nigeria stopped transmitting electricity to Niger, leading to large-scale power outages. The company started buying electricity from Nigeria in 2024 after the ban was removed.

== See also ==
- SONIDEP
