= Maradi, Niger =

Maradi
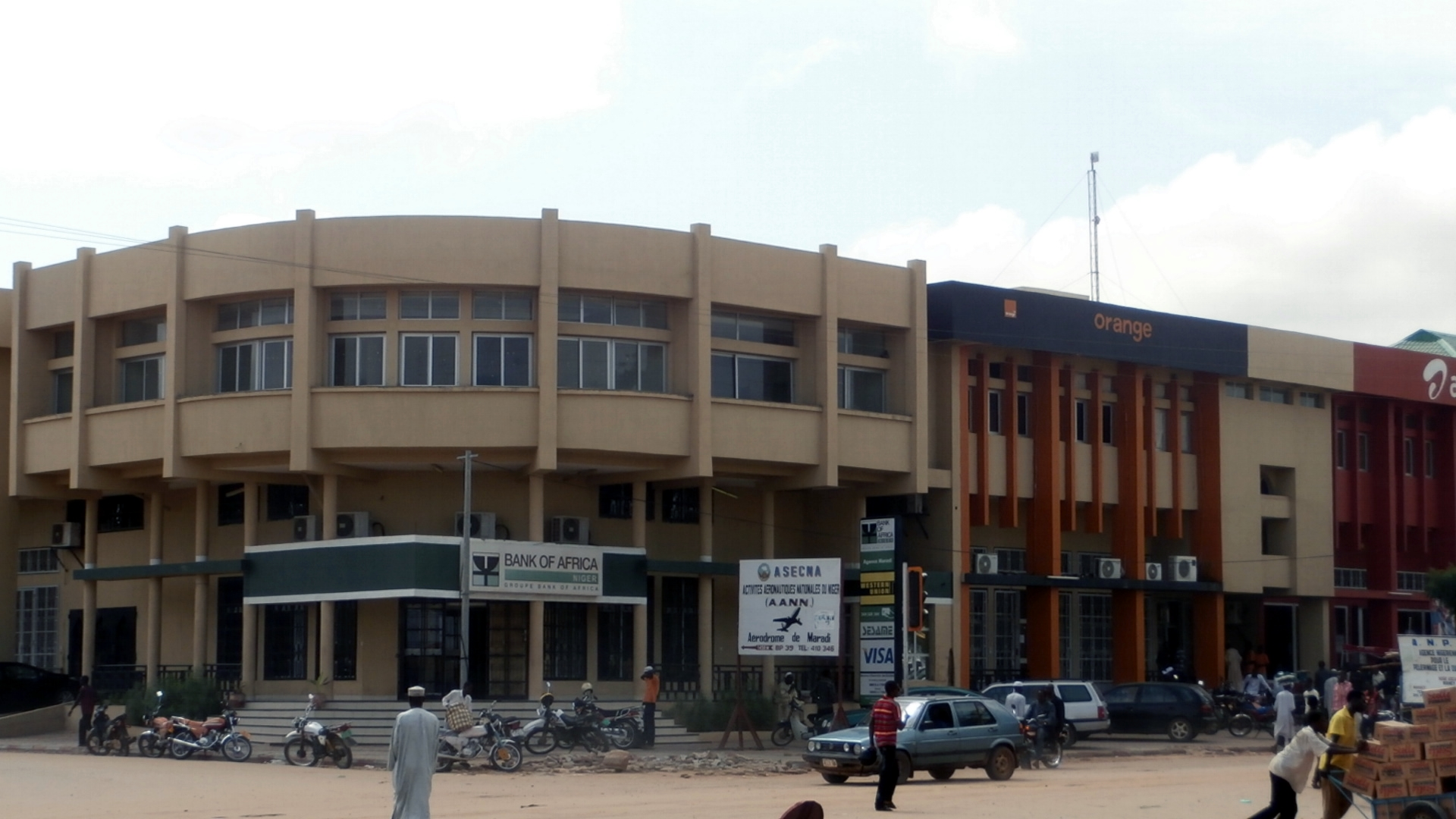
- A street in Maradi, Niger

- Location in Niger
- Coordinates: 13°29′30″N 7°5′47″E
- Country: Niger
- Region: Maradi Region
- Department: Maradi Department
- Urban Commune: Maradi

Government
  - Type: Seat of Departmental and Regional councils, Urban Commune

Area
  - Land: 74 km^{2} (29 sq mi)
- Elevation: 385 m (1,263 ft)

Population (2012)
  - Total: 267,249
  - Density: 3,600/km^{2} (9,400/sq mi)
  - Summer (DST): UTC+1

Maradi is a city in Niger and the administrative centre of Maradi Region. It is also the seat of the Maradi Department and an Urban Commune. Maradi has an estimated population of 270,000 and is the second largest city in Niger after the capital Niamey.

== History ==
Originally part of Katsina, a Hausa state, it became independent in the 19th century. From the early 19th century, Maradi was home to one of several Hausa traditional rump states, formed by rulers and nobility who fled the rise of the Sokoto Caliphate. Elements of the Katsina ruling class continued to claim the area as the seat of a Katsina state in exile ruled by the Sarkin Katsina Maradi. Maradi was constrained by the more powerful Gobir exilic state to the west, the Sultanate of Damagaram based at Zinder to the east, and Sokoto to the south. The arrival of the French in 1899 saw the bloody destruction of the town by the Voulet–Chanoine Mission, but later the town recovered to become an important regional centre of commerce by the 1950s.

The expansion of the city in the first half of the 20th century was dynamic, albeit modest, with the population nearly doubling between 1911 and 1950. Up until 1945, the ancient city of Maradi was located in the valley bordering the Goulbi N'Maradi, a seasonal waterway with its source in Nigeria. The urban area, roughly circular in shape, was protected by a mud wall with four doors. The ancient city was flooded by this river at the end of the rainy season of 1945. To avoid future inundation, the French colonial administration decided then to adjust the urban layout. In the process, the city lost its traditional, irregular layout in favour of a grid system. The French sought to create cash-crop agriculture, mostly groundnuts, which increasingly made the city an important regional commercial centre. Aided by economic growth after the 1950s, Maradi experienced a demographic boom, with the population increasing from 8,661 in 1950 to 80,000 by 1983. By the time of Niger's independence in 1960, Maradi was a centre of Hausa culture, vying with the larger traditional Hausa centre of Zinder to the east.

In 2000 a riot broke out in the town by Muslim groups opposed to the staging of the Festival International de la Mode en Afrique (FIMA) in Niamey, resulting in the destruction of various buildings deemed un-Islamic, such as brothels and bars.

== Geography ==
The city is divided into three urban municipalities: Maradi I, Maradi II and Maradi III. Maradi is centred on the Grand-marché, a large daily market of wholesale, retail, and agricultural goods from across south central Niger and also the cross-border trade with Nigeria. Some of the districts in the town include Zaria and Sabon Gari in the north, and to the west Mokoya, Dan Gouleye, Bagalam, Yandaka, Maradawa, Hassao and Limantchi.

== Climate ==
Maradi has a hot semi-arid climate (Köppen BSh) typical for the far south of Niger. It experiences an oppressive, mostly cloudy wet season, and a windy, partly cloudy dry season. Temperatures are hot to sweltering year round, typically ranging from 58 to 104 °F (14.4 to 40.0 °C), and rarely fall below 53 °F (11.7 °C) or above 107 °F (41.7 °C).

Climate data for Maradi Airport (1961–1990)
Month	Jan	Feb	Mar	Apr	May	Jun	Jul	Aug	Sep	Oct	Nov	Dec	Year
Mean maximum °C (°F)	35.0 (95.0)	38.3 (100.9)	41.3 (106.3)	42.9 (109.2)	42.4 (108.3)	40.8 (105.4)	36.9 (98.4)	34.9 (94.8)	37.3 (99.1)	38.6 (101.5)	37.3 (99.1)	35.6 (96.1)	42.9 (109.2)
Mean daily maximum °C (°F)	30.2 (86.4)	33.6 (92.5)	37.0 (98.6)	40.0 (104.0)	39.7 (103.5)	37.0 (98.6)	33.2 (91.8)	31.7 (89.1)	33.8 (92.8)	36.3 (97.3)	33.9 (93.0)	31.1 (88.0)	34.8 (94.6)
Daily mean °C (°F)	21.6 (70.9)	24.6 (76.3)	28.4 (83.1)	32.0 (89.6)	32.7 (90.9)	31.0 (87.8)	28.2 (82.8)	27.0 (80.6)	28.2 (82.8)	28.4 (83.1)	25.2 (77.4)	22.3 (72.1)	27.4 (81.3)
Mean daily minimum °C (°F)	13.0 (55.4)	15.6 (60.1)	19.8 (67.6)	24.0 (75.2)	25.7 (78.3)	25.0 (77.0)	23.2 (73.8)	22.2 (72.0)	22.5 (72.5)	20.5 (68.9)	16.5 (61.7)	13.5 (56.3)	20.1 (68.2)
Mean minimum °C (°F)	8.8 (47.8)	11.4 (52.5)	14.5 (58.1)	18.5 (65.3)	20.9 (69.6)	20.1 (68.2)	19.5 (67.1)	19.2 (66.6)	19.1 (66.4)	16.3 (61.3)	12.1 (53.8)	9.5 (49.1)	8.8 (47.8)
Average rainfall mm (inches)	0.0 (0.0)	0.0 (0.0)	0.3 (0.01)	4.1 (0.16)	18.9 (0.74)	63.5 (2.50)	149.0 (5.87)	175.1 (6.89)	74.9 (2.95)	6.6 (0.26)	0.0 (0.0)	0.0 (0.0)	491.3 (19.34)
Mean monthly sunshine hours	282.1	263.2	269.7	261.0	291.4	279.0	257.3	235.6	255.0	285.2	282.0	279.0	3,248.5
Mean daily sunshine hours	9.1	9.4	8.7	8.7	9.4	9.3	8.3	7.6	8.5	9.2	9.4	9.0	8.9
Source: NOAA

== Demographics ==
Year	Population (Census)
1977	44,458
1988	110,005
2001	148,017
2012	267,249

At the 2012 census, the official population of Maradi was 267,249, making it the second largest city in the country, with the predominant ethnic group in the city being Hausa, with a few urbanised Fulani and Tuaregs living there as well. Various ethnic groups from Nigeria, particularly Ibo and Yoruba, can also be found in skilled trades or in small shops.

== Places of worship ==
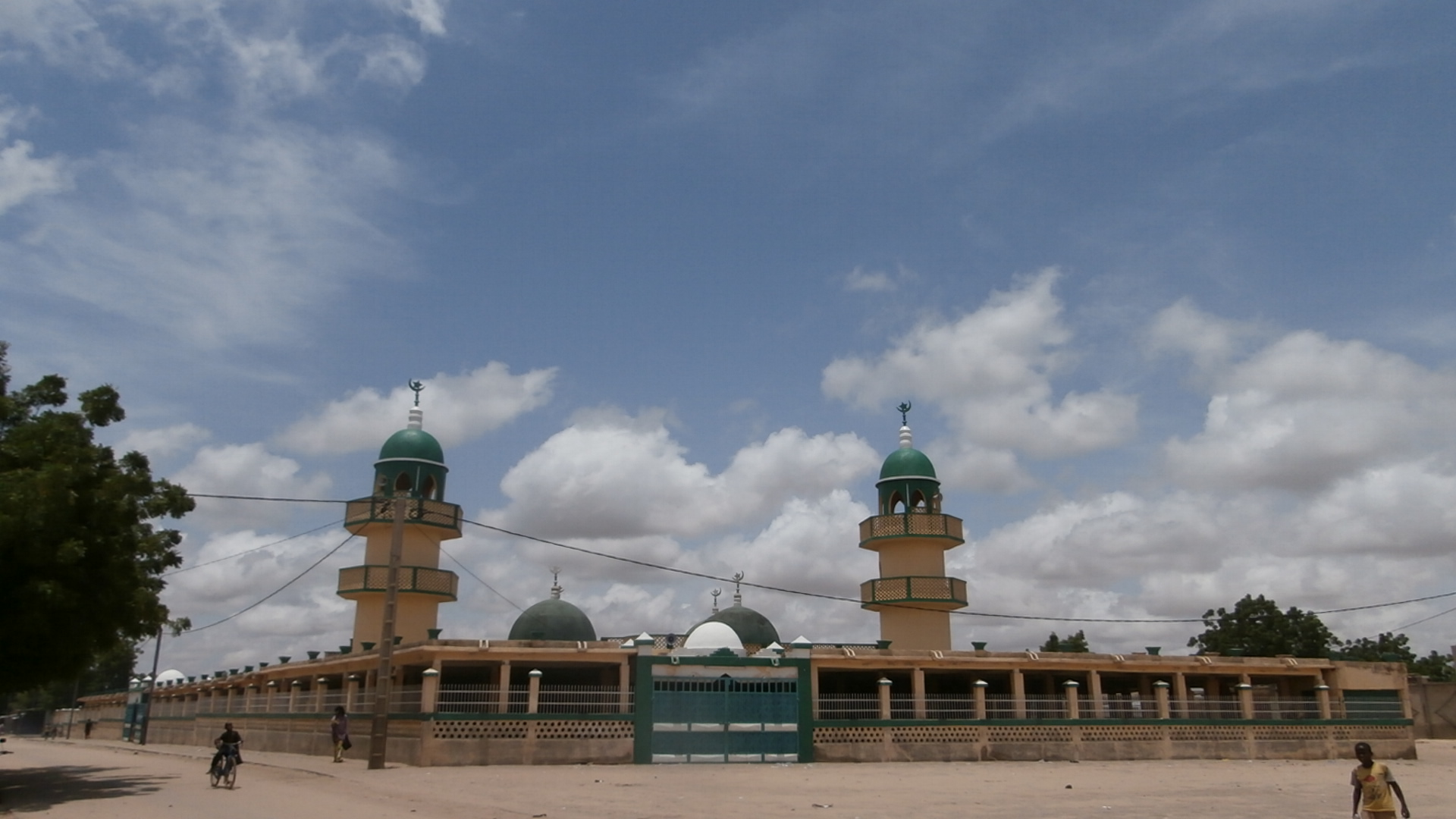
The Sultanate Mosque

There are several large mosques in the town. There are also some Christian churches and temples, with the Roman Catholic Diocese of Maradi, Our Lady of Lourdes Cathedral, various Protestant churches and the Assemblies of God having a presence.

== Economy ==
Maradi is the major transport trade and agricultural hub of Niger's south central Hausa region. It lies on the major east–west paved highway which crosses from Niamey in the west to Diffa in the far east. It also has an airport. Maradi has long been a trading city, on the route north from Kano, Nigeria. This explains why one can use either the West African CFA franc (Niger's official currency) or the Nigerian Naira for currency in Maradi. The city lies in a region known for groundnut cultivation.

== Education ==
- Dan Dicko Dankoulodo University of Maradi, UDDM (2008)
- Institut Universitaire de Technologie IUT

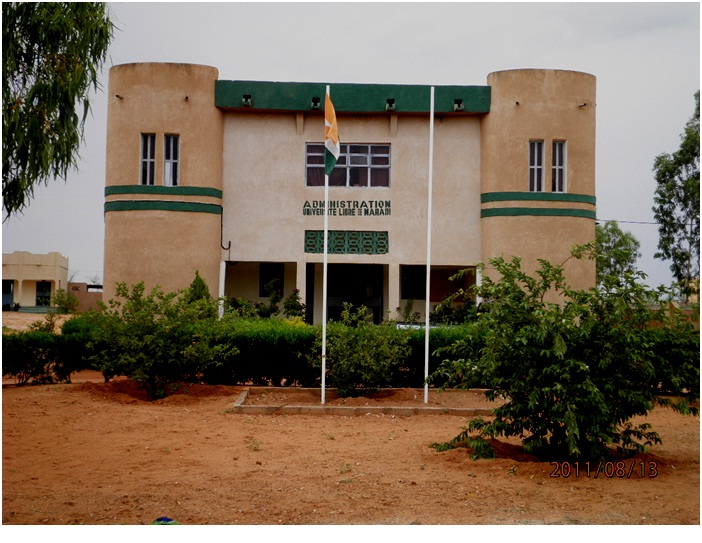
The Free University of Maradi

The Free University of Maradi was founded in 2004. There is a Maryam Abacha American University Niger located in the city of Maradi.

== Notable people ==
- Siradji Sani, Nigerien footballer
- Mariama Gamatié Bayard, 2011 presidential candidate

== Gallery ==
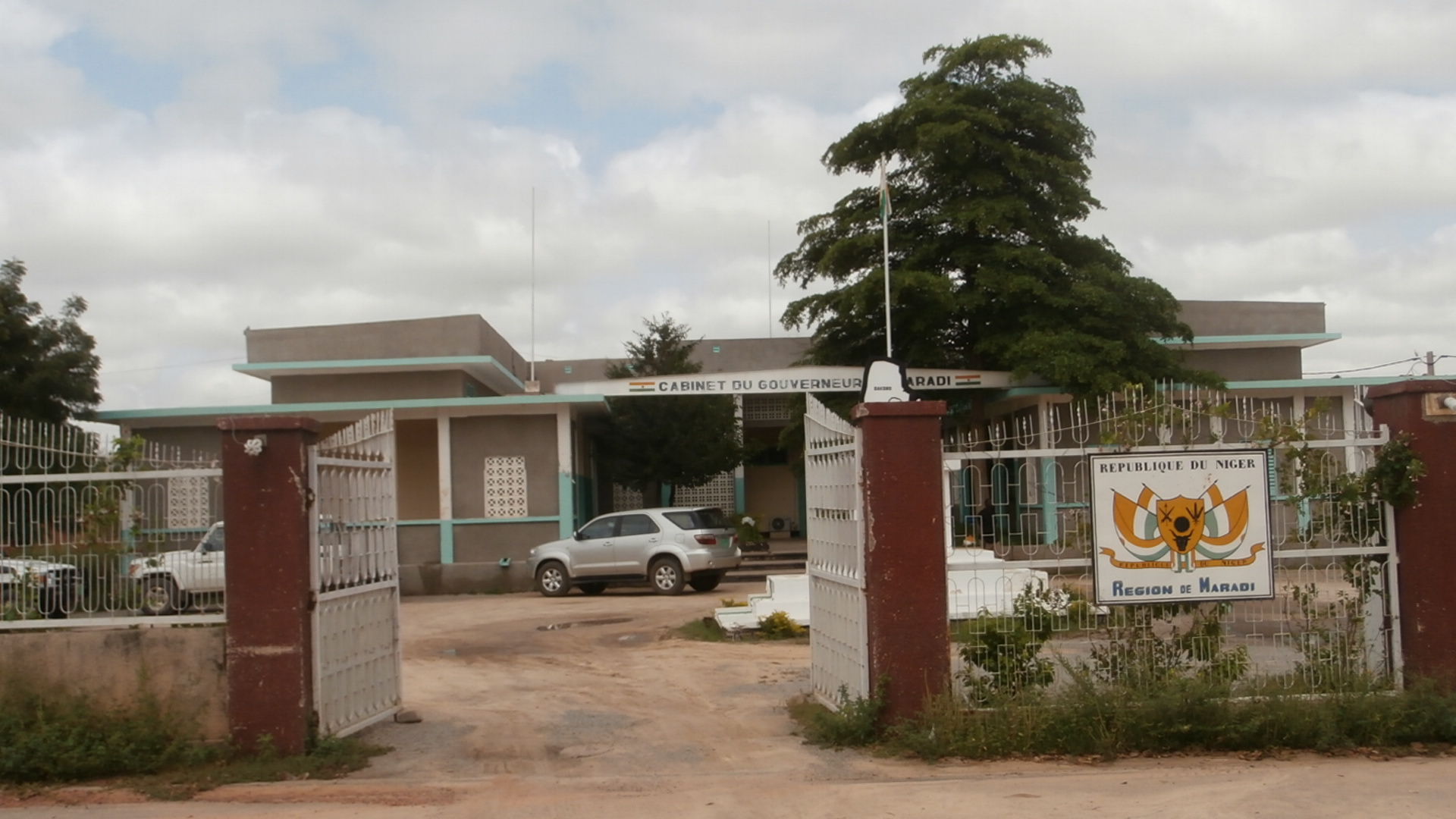
Regional government building

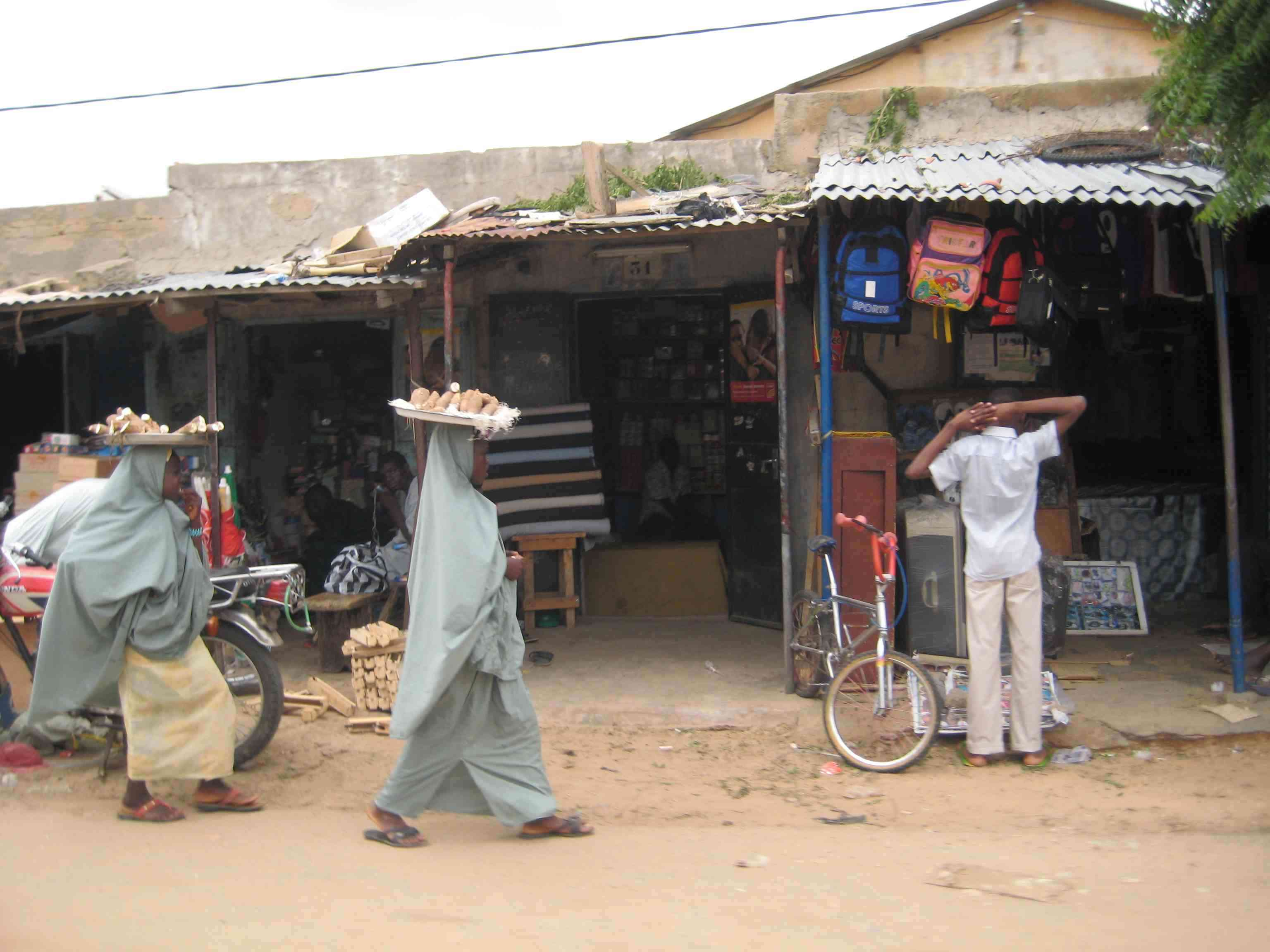
Street scene in Maradi

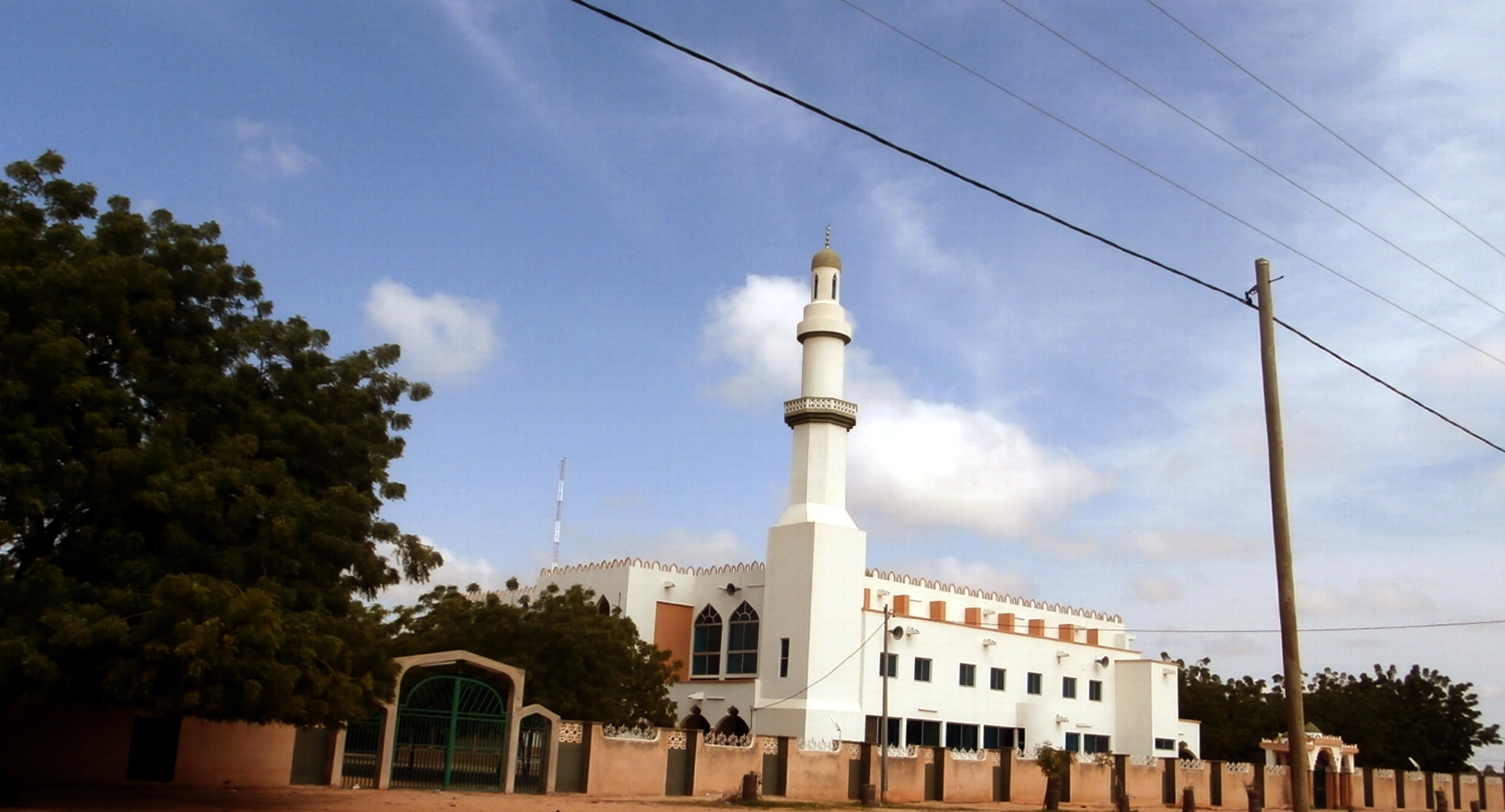
A mosque in Maradi

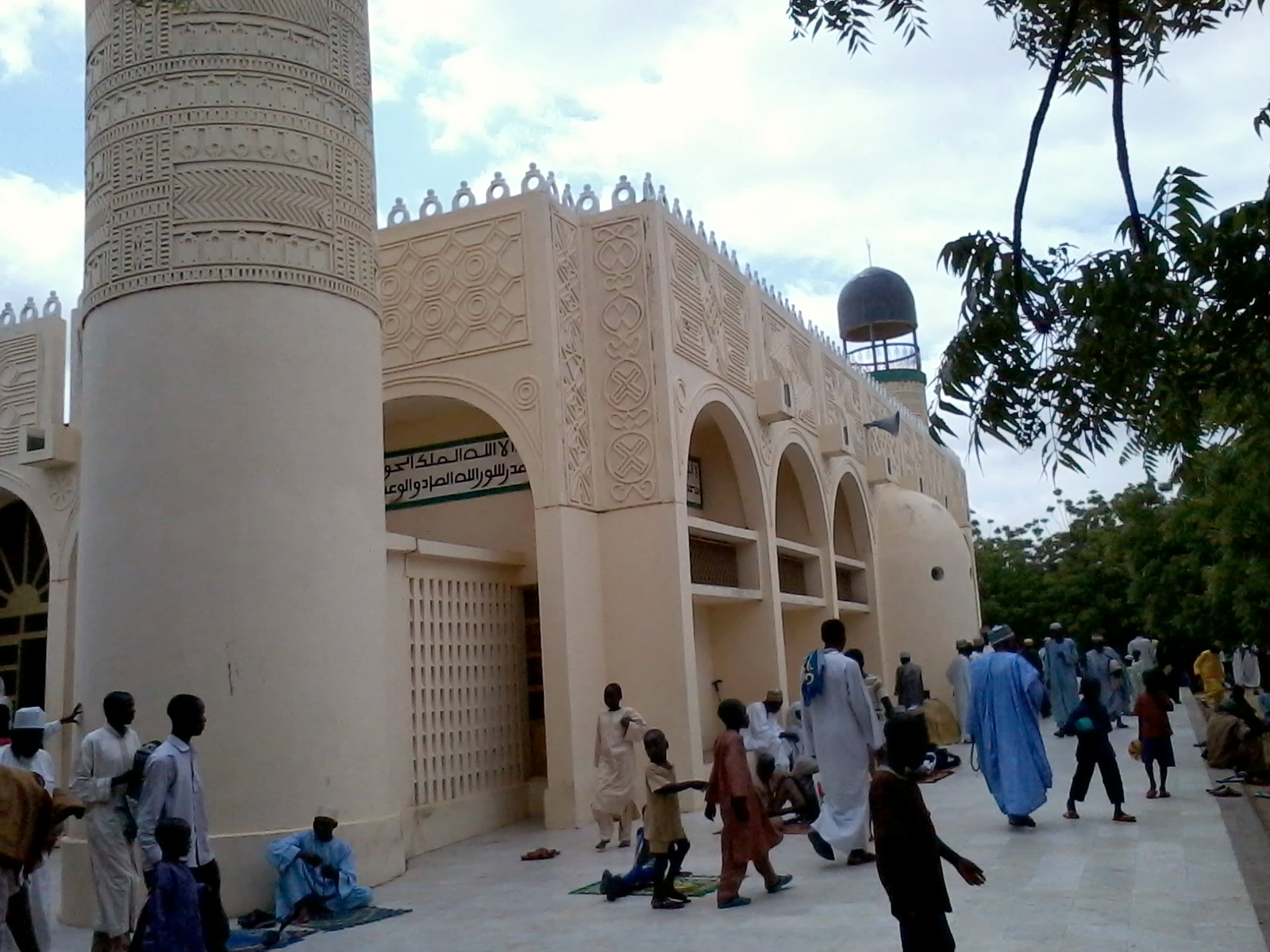
Worshippers at the Tchana Mosque

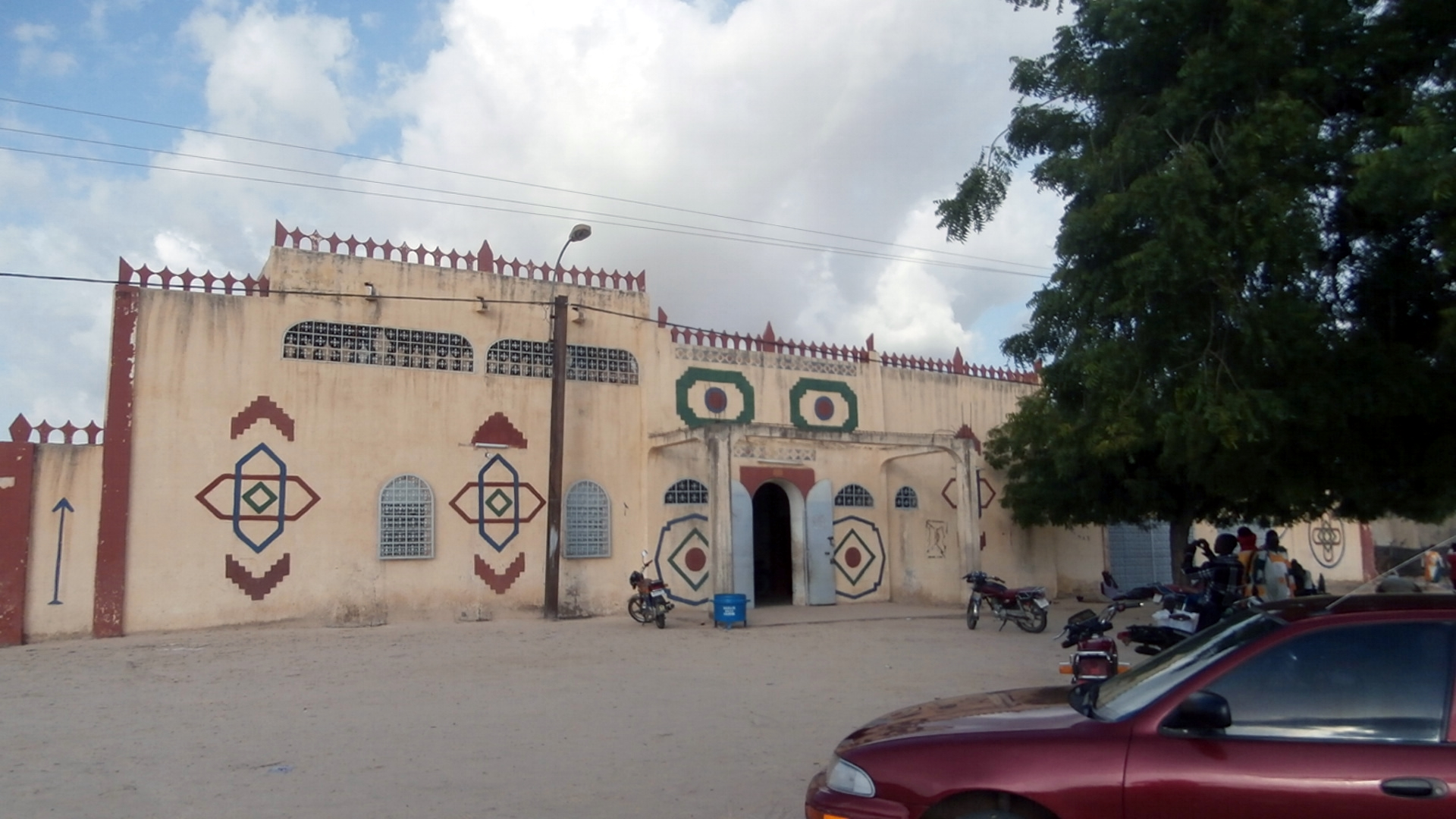
Traditional-style Hausa architecture buildings
