= 2026 in Niger =

- Decades: 2000s; 2010s; 2020s
- See also: Other events of 2026; Timeline of Nigerien history

This article lists events from the year 2026 in Niger.

== Incumbents ==
- President of Niger: Abdourahamane Tiani
- Prime Minister of Niger: Ali Lamine Zeine

== Events ==
=== Ongoing ===
- Benin–Niger Crisis
- Islamist insurgency in Niger

=== January ===
- 4 January – Jihadist attack the residence of the prefect of Torodi, who also was a captain in the Nigerien Army, killing him and his entire family. The jihadists also seize government vehicles and free several prisoners during the attack.
- 12 January – The government withdraws the operating licences of 33 transport operators and truck drivers for refusing to transport fuel to Mali amid the jihadist insurgency.
- 18 January – At least 31 people are killed in an attack by gunmen on the village of Gorouol in Tillabéri Region.
- 29 January – Diori Hamani International Airport attack: Islamic State – Sahel Province militants launch an attack on Diori Hamani International Airport in Niamey, leaving 20 attackers dead and four soldiers injured.

=== February ===
- 4 February – JNIM militants seize an army position in Makalondi, killing at least 36 soldiers and injuring several others. JNIM also captures 12 military vehicles with mounted machine guns.
- 26 February – JNIM militants kill 26 members of the Anzourou militia in the Tillaberi Region.

=== March ===
- 5 March – The junta cancels gold mining concessions granted to Comini, Afrior, and Ecomine, citing breaches of contract. It also rejects a request by British energy firm Savannah Energy to extend its exploration and drilling licence in the country’s south-east, citing breaches of contract.
- 8 March – The army repels an attack by motorcycled gunmen at the military drone base inside Tahoua Airport, leaving several assailants dead and several soldiers injured.

=== April ===
- 21 April – Russia announces the release of two employees of a Russian geology company held captive in Niger since 2024 by JNIM militants following a rescue operation carried out by the Africa Corps.

=== May ===
- 8 May – The government orders the suspension of broadcasts in Niger of nine French media outlets on charges of "threatening public order and national security".
- 14 May – JNIM militants ambush a military engineer camp in Garbougna, Tillaberi Region, killing 67, including several civilians, and destroying the camp.

=== June ===
- 4 June – Authorities announce the discovery of a stranded truck carrying pilgrims from a religious festival in Mali that broke down in the Sahara Desert near Assamaka, Agadez Region, leaving 49 passengers dead from thirst and two survivors.
- 11 June – The junta introduces a new penal code that also outlaws homosexuality with sentences of up to 10 years.
- 18 June – JNIM militants stage an attack on Diori Hamani International Airport, leaving 11 soldiers, two civilians and 22 attackers dead, with 20 more suspects arrested.
- 22 June – Niger files notice of its departure from the International Criminal Court, accusing the chamber of selective justice.

=== August ===
- 9 August – Two buses collide near Madaoua, killing 22 people.
- 14 August – A US missionary kidnapped in the country is released by Islamic State - Sahel Province following efforts by the Trump administration.
- 29 August – The junta puts down a coup attempt in Niamey that saw attacks on the presidential palace, Diori Hamani International Airport and the state broadcaster RTN.

=== September ===
- 11 September – President Tiani replaces military chief of staff Moussa Salaou Barmou with Mamane Sani Kiaou for unspecified reasons.
- 17 September – The U.S. International Development Finance Corporation approves a debt facility worth up to $414 million for Canadian miner Global Atomic's Dasa project in Niger, which the company describes as the highest-grade uranium deposit in Africa.

== Holidays ==
- 1 January – New Year's Day
- 28 March – Laylat al-Qadr
- 30 March – Eid al-Fitr
- 21 April – Easter Monday
- 24 April – Concord Day
- 1 May – Labour Day
- 6 June – Eid al-Adha
- 26 June – Islamic New Year
- 3 August – Independence Day
- 4 September – The Prophet's Birthday
- 18 December – Nigerien Republic Day
- 25 December – Christmas Day
