= 2024 in Niger =

- Decades: 2000s; 2010s; 2020s
- See also: Other events of 2024; Timeline of Nigerien history

This article lists events from the year 2024 in Niger.

== Incumbents ==
- President of Niger: Abdourahamane Tiani
- Prime Minister of Niger: Ali Lamine Zeine

== Events ==
Ongoing – Benin–Niger Crisis

=== February ===
- 24 February – At a summit in Abuja, ECOWAS lifts sanctions on Niger, however still wanting the release of Mohamed Bazoum and his family.

=== March ===
- 7 March – The Alliance of Sahel States, comprising Mali, Burkina Faso and Niger, announce the creation of a joint force between the three countries to combat jihadist groups in the three countries.
- 17 March – The National Council for the Safeguard of the Homeland revokes a military accord with the United States that allowed U.S. Defense Department personnel on its soil.

=== April ===
- 12 April – Dozens of Russian military instructors arrive in Niger as part of an agreement with the junta to help train Nigerien troops to fight jihadist insurgents.

=== May ===
- 2 May – Russian military personnel allegedly enter the United States–operated Niger Air Base 101 near Diori Hamani International Airport.

=== June ===
- 13 June – Six soldiers are killed in an attack on the Niger–Benin Oil Pipeline between the villages of Salkam and Tibiri, in Dosso region.
- 14 June – The State Security Court retracts the immunity of deposed president Mohamed Bazoum, opening him up to be prosecuted for high treason and undermining national security.
- 21 June:
  - The junta revokes the operating licence of French nuclear fuel producer Orano for the Imouraren uranium mine.
  - At least 21 people are killed by floods in Maradi region and the suburbs of Niamey after unusually heavy rainfall in the region.
- 25 June – An ambush on security forces near the village of Tassia in Tillabéri Region leaves at least 20 soldiers and a civilian dead and several others wounded.

=== July ===
- 7 July – The U.S. military withdraws entirely from Air Base 201 in Niamey.
- 8 July – An attack by suspected jihadist groups on security forces between the villages of Ila Fari and Djangore in Tillabéri Region leaves at least 14 soldiers dead, 11 others wounded and 24 missing.
- 11 July – An unspecified number of inmates escape from the Koutoukale prison in Tillabéri Region.

=== August ===
- 3 August – The Jama'a Nusrat ul-Islam wa al-Muslimin takes two Russian nationals hostage in Mbanga.
- 5 August – The US officially returns Air Base 201 in Agadez to Nigerien control.
- 6 August – Niger breaks diplomatic relations with Ukraine, citing claims of support for "terrorist" groups.
- 21 August – Burkina Faso, Mali and Niger write to the United Nations Security Council complaining that Ukraine is supporting rebel groups in the Sahel region.

=== September ===
- 3 September – The 19th century Zinder Mosque is destroyed by flooding.
- 16 September – The US military completes its withdrawal from Niger.

=== November ===
- 12 November – The junta outlaws the France-based Agency for Technical Cooperation and Development from operating in Niger.
- 24 November – The European Union recalls its ambassador to Niger amid criticism by the junta over the distribution of humanitarian aid by the bloc.

=== December ===
- 4 December – The junta takes operational control over the Arlit mine previously operated by French nuclear energy firm Orano.
- 10 December – Ten soldiers are killed in a militant attack on the village of Petel Kole, near the border with Burkina Faso.
- 12 December – The junta imposes a three-month suspension on the operations of the BBC in Niger over its coverage of attacks by extremist groups.
- 16 December – ECOWAS approves the withdrawal of Burkina Faso, Mali and Niger from the bloc effective January 2025 but gives them until July 2025 to reconsider.

== Holidays ==
- 1 January – New Year's Day
- 1 April - Easter Monday
- 6 April - Laylat al-Qadr
- 10 April - Eid al-Fitr
- 24 April – Concord Day
- 1 May – Labour Day
- 17 June – Eid al-Adha
- 7 July – Islamic New Year
- 3 August – Independence Day
- 16 September – The Prophet's Birthday
- 18 December – Nigerien Republic Day
- 25 December – Christmas Day

== Deaths ==
- 24 October – Hama Amadou, 74, prime minister (1995-1996, 1999-2007).
