= 2020 in Niger =

- Decades: 2000s; 2010s; 2020s
- See also: Other events of 2020; Timeline of Nigerien history

This article lists events from the year 2020 in Niger.

== Incumbents ==
- President: Mahamadou Issoufou
- Prime Minister: Brigi Rafini

== Events ==
- January 9 – Insurgency in the Maghreb: Battle of Chinagodrar.
- March 19 – The first case of COVID-19 was confirmed in Niger.
- May 9 – May 2020 Tillabéri attacks.
- May 18 – Boko Haram militants attacked the Blabrine military base near Diffa, killing twelve Nigerien soldiers. Seven militants were also killed in the attack.
- August 9 – Gunmen killed six French volunteers with ACTED, along with two Nigeriens, in the Tillabéri Region.
- October 27 - An American citizen was kidnapped in Birni-N'Konni.
- December 14 – Boko Haram claims responsibility for 27 deaths in Toumour, Diffa.
- December 27 – 2020 Nigerien general election.

== Deaths ==
- May 5 – Mohamed Ben Omar, Labor Minister (b. 1965).
- November 24 – Mamadou Tandja, 82, politician, President (1999–2010).
- December 16 – Abdallah Wafy, Ambassador of Niger to the United States.
- December 24 – Issaka Assane Karanta, 75, politician, Mayor of Commune I (1996–1999) and Commune III (2010–2011) of Niamey, Governor of Niamey Capital District (since 2018), COVID-19.

== See also ==
- 2020 in West Africa
- COVID-19 pandemic in Niger
