= Diori Hamani International Airport attack =

Diori Hamani International Airport attack may refer to:

- 1999 Nigerien coup d'état
- 2021 Nigerien coup attempt
- January 2026 Diori Hamani International Airport attack
- June 2026 Diori Hamani International Airport attack
- 2026 Nigerien coup attempt
