= Nigerien coup d'état =

Nigerien coup d'état may refer one of the following:

- 1974 Nigerien coup d'état
- 1996 Nigerien coup d'état
- 1999 Nigerien coup d'état
- 2010 Nigerien coup d'état
- 2011 Nigerien coup attempt
- 2021 Nigerien coup attempt
- 2023 Nigerien coup d'état
- 2026 Nigerien coup attempt

== See also ==
- List of coups d'état and coup attempts by country#Niger
