= 2025 in Niger =

- Decades: 2000s; 2010s; 2020s
- See also: Other events of 2025; Timeline of Nigerien history

This article lists events from the year 2025 in Niger.

== Incumbents ==
- President of Niger: Abdourahamane Tiani
- Prime Minister of Niger: Ali Lamine Zeine

== Events ==
Ongoing:

- Benin–Niger Crisis
- Islamist insurgency in Niger

=== January ===
- 12 January – An Austrian woman Eva Gretzmacher is abducted by unidentified gunmen in Agadez.
- 21 January – Four Moroccan truck drivers abducted along the border with Burkina Faso on 18 January are released.
- 22 January – Defense minister Salifou Mody announces the creation of a joint military force with Burkina Faso and Mali to combat extremist groups.
- 29 January – Niger, along with Burkina Faso and Mali, formally leave ECOWAS.

=== February ===
- 3 February – At least 20 soldiers conducting an operation against cattle thieves are killed in an ambush in Takzat.
- 6 February – The junta orders the expulsion of the International Committee of the Red Cross from Niger without providing an explanation.
- 20 February – The National Conference tasked with advising the junta officially recommends the banning of all existing political parties, a maximum of five political parties to be created, and a transition to civilian rule in five years.

=== March ===
- 8 March – Niger orders the expulsion of three Chinese oil officials from CNPC, WAPCo, and SORAZ, citing disputes over pay and project delays.
- 17 March – Niger withdraws from the Organisation internationale de la Francophonie.
- 21 March – Forty-four people are killed in an attack on the village of Fambita, near the border with Mali and Burkina Faso, that is blamed on Islamic State – Sahel Province.
- 26 March – Abdourahamane Tiani is formally sworn in as president as part of the five-year political transition process prescribed by the new transitional charter.
- 30 March – The junta announces Niger's withdrawal from the Multinational Joint Task Force fighting armed Islamist groups in the Lake Chad region.

=== April ===
- 1 April – The junta releases 50 people, including four ministers and other officials associated with deposed president Mohamed Bazoum.
- 6 April – Burkina Faso, Niger and Mali withdraw their ambassadors from Algeria as part of protests against claims by Algiers that it had shot down a drone near the Malian border on 31 March.
- 13 April – A Swiss national Claudia Abbt is abducted by unidentified gunmen in Agadez.
- 25 April – Twelve soldiers are killed in an attack by unidentified gunmen near Sakoira in which five Indian nationals are also abducted.

=== May ===
- 5 May – Ten soldiers are killed while seven others are injured in an ambush by militants in Dosso Region.

=== June ===
- 16 June – The army raids jihadist-controlled illegal gold mining sites near Tagueye, killing 13 insurgents and arresting one.
- 19 June –
  - At least 34 soldiers are killed in an attack by gunmen on vehicles in Banibangou.
  - The government orders the nationalization of the SOMAIR uranium venture operated by the French firm Orano, accusing the latter of taking a disproportionate share of the uranium produced under the project.

=== July ===
- 15 July – Two Indian nationals are killed, while a third is abducted by gunmen in Dosso Region.

=== August ===
- 15 August – Ibrahim Mahamadou a.k.a. Bakoura, said to be the leader of Boko Haram since 2021, is reported killed in an airstrike by the Niger Air Force in Shilawa.
- 20 August – At least 47 people are killed, while around 56,000 are displaced due to flooding caused by heavy rains nationwide.

=== September ===
- 10 September – At least 14 soldiers are killed in an ambush by unknown militants in Tillabéri Region.
- 17 September – At least 22 people are killed in an attack on a baptism ceremony in Tillabéri Region.
- 22 September – Mali, Burkina Faso and Niger jointly announce their withdrawal from the International Criminal Court, accusing it of selective justice.
- 26 September – At least 30 people are killed in an airstrike near a weekly market in Tillabéri Region.

=== October ===
- 21 October – An American missionary is abducted by unidentified individuals in Niamey.
- 31 October – The United States issues a Level 4 (“Do Not Travel”) advisory for Niger, and authorizes the departure of diplomats’ family members.

=== November ===
- 19 November – JNIM carries out an attack in the Tillabéri Region that results in at least ten Nigerien soldiers killed.

=== December ===
- 16 December – US President Donald Trump issues a proclamation barring Nigerien nationals from entering the United States.
- 21 December – Burkina Faso, Mali and Niger launch a joint security force headquartered in Niamey under the auspices of the Alliance of Sahel States.
- 26 December – The junta decrees a general mobilization of the public and requisition of resources as part of efforts against the Islamist insurgency.

== Holidays ==
- 1 January – New Year's Day
- 28 March – Laylat al-Qadr
- 30 March – Eid al-Fitr
- 21 April – Easter Monday
- 24 April – Concord Day
- 1 May – Labour Day
- 6 June – Eid al-Adha
- 26 June – Islamic New Year
- 3 August – Independence Day
- 4 September – The Prophet's Birthday
- 18 December – Nigerien Republic Day
- 25 December – Christmas Day

== Deaths ==
- 7 March – Oumarou Malam Alma, 73, former MP.
