= Route nationale 1 (disambiguation) =

Route nationale 1 (RN 1 or RN1) is the name of a trunk road in many counties:

- Route nationale 1 (France) between Paris and Calais.
- Route nationale 1 (French Guiana) between Cayenne and Saint-Laurent-du-Maroni
- Route nationale 1 (Madagascar)
- Route nationale 1 (Niger)
- Route nationale 1 (Réunion)
- Route nationale 1 (Tunisia)

== See Also ==
- List of highways numbered 1
