= Issaka Assane Karanta =

Nigerien academic (1945–2020)

Governor of Niamey Capital District
- In office March 2018 – 23 December 2020
- Preceded by: Hamidou Garba
- Succeeded by: TBD

Mayor of Commune III of Niamey
- In office 2010–2011

Mayor of Commune I of Niamey
- In office 1996–1999

Personal details
- Born: 1 January 1945 Damana, Filingue Department, French Niger
- Died: 23 December 2020 (aged 75) Niamey, Niger

Issaka Assane Karanta (1 January 1945 – 23 December 2020) was a Nigerien academic, academic administrator, and politician.

He served as the mayor of Commune I of Niamey from 1996 to 1999 and the Mayor of Commune III of Niamey from 2010 to 2011. Karanta also served as the governor of Niamey Capital District, which encompasses the capital city of Niamey, from 2018 until his death in office from COVID-19 on 23 December 2020, during the COVID-19 pandemic in Niger.

== Biography ==
Karanta was born in Damana in the Filingue Department of the present-day Republic of Niger on 1 January 1945. Much of his professional career focused on education and administration.

Karanta was a professor of natural sciences at CEG 4 in Niamey from 1976 to 1995. He then became head of the Geology Pedagogical Support Laboratory from 1995 to 1996, when he entered politics and urban administration.

He served as the mayor of Commune I (also known as Niamey I), one of the five urban communes which make up the city of Niamey, from 1996 until 1999. He later became the Mayor of Commune I from 2010 to 2011. Karanta worked as a mission officer for the High Authority for Peacebuilding (Haute Autorité à la Consolidation de la Paix) from 2011 to 2018.

In March 2018, Karanta became the Governor of Niamey Capital District, which includes the city of Niamey. He held the governorship of the capital region from 2018 until his death in office on 23 December 2020 from COVID-19.

Governor Issaka Assane Karanta died from COVID-19 during the COVID-19 pandemic in Niger at L'Hôpital de Référence in Niamey on 23 December 2020, at the age of 75, nine days short from his 76th birthday. Dignitaries in attendance at his funeral ceremony included Prime Minister Brigi Rafini, President of the National Assembly Ousseini Tinni, government officials, and members of the diplomatic corps accredited to Niger. The main funeral speech was delivered by Karanta's brother, Amadou Soumaila.

Karanta was buried in his hometown of Damana, Filingue Department.
