= 2021 in Niger =

- Decades: 2000s; 2010s; 2020s
- See also: Other events of 2021; Timeline of Nigerien history

This article lists events from the year 2021 in Niger.

== Incumbents ==
- President
  - Mahamadou Issoufou
  - Mohamed Bazoum, starting April 2
- Prime Minister: Brigi Rafini

== Events ==
=== January to June ===
- January 2 – One hundred people including dozens of civilians, were killed by unidentified terrorists in Tchombangou and Zaroumdareye in Tillabéri Region.
- January 4 – Three days of mourning are declared for the victims of the January 2 terrorist attacks.
- February 21 – 2020–21 Nigerien general election second round. Seven members of the National Electoral Commission are killed and three injured when their car hits an explosive device in Dargol.
- February 24 – Opposition leader Mahamane Ousmane declares he won the election the day after the Independent National Electoral Commission (CENI) announced former interior minister Mohamed Bazoum had won. CENI says Bazoum had 55.75% of the vote and Ousmane had 44.25%, but the latter claims there was fraud.
- February 26 – Mohamed Bazoum rules out a power-sharing deal with the opposition and blames it for bringing children from rural areas for post-election protests. Two people died and 400 were arrested during election violence.
- March 8 – President Mahamadou Issoufou wins the 2020 Ibrahim Prize for Achievement in African Leadership.
- March 17 – 58 people were killed when gunmen attacked a bus in Tillabéri Region.
- March 21 – Suspected jihadists attack three villages in Tahoua Region, killing 137.
- March 31 – 2021 Nigerien coup d'état attempt
- April 2 – Mohamed Bazoum is sworn in as president after a failed coup attempt.
- April 3 – The Niger human rights commission calls for an independent inquiry following alleged rapes, including that of an 11-year-old girl, by Chadian soldiers deployed to help fight armed groups.

=== July to December ===
- July 12 – An attack in the Tchoma Bangou village kills five civilians and four soldiers. 40 attackers were also killed during the attack.
- July 25 – Armed Assailants attacked the villages of Wiye and Deykoukou in the Tillabéri region, killing at least 33 civilians.
- July 31 – Militants linked to Jama'at Nasr al-Islam wal-Muslimin ambushed a Nigerien military convoy near Torodi, killing 18 soldiers and one civilian.
- August 16 – Armed assailants kill 37 people in the village of Darey Dey.
- August 20 – Gunmen attacked a mosque during Friday prayers in Theim. Tillabéri Reigon, killing at least 17 worshippers.
- August 25 – Militants aligned with Boko Haram attacked a military post in the Diffa Region, killing 16 soldiers and injuring 9 more. About 50 militants were killed in the resulting combat.
- October 13 – Mosque massacre kills 10 in Tillaberi.
- November 4 – 69 people, including the town mayor, were killed after gunmen ambushed a delegation in Banibangou.
- November 7 – Niger gold mine collapse
- November 8 – 26 schoolchildren were killed and 13 others were injured during a school fire in Maradi.
- November 27 – Two people were killed and 18 more were injured after protesters clashed with a French military convoy after it crossed the border from Burkina Faso.

== See also ==
- COVID-19 pandemic in Africa
- Economic Community of West African States
- Community of Sahel–Saharan States
- G5 Sahel
- Boko Haram
