= Ko-on =

Pre-Go-on layer of Sino-Japanese character readings

Ko-on (古音, ko-on) (kana: こおん; literally "old sounds") is a layer of Sino-Japanese character readings (Japanese pronunciations of Chinese origin) that predates the transmission of Go-on to Japan. Examples occur in ancient inscriptions, including documents from the reign of Empress Suiko, in which Chinese characters transcribe proper names, and in early man'yōgana, a way of writing Japanese syllables with Chinese characters used for their sounds rather than their meanings. The layer has also been called "old Korean readings" (古韓音, kokan'on) and "Sino-Japanese readings in documents of the Suiko court" (推古朝遺文の漢字音, Suiko-chō ibun no kanji-on).

== Terminology ==
In Japanese, ko-on (古音) can mean an old pronunciation in a general sense. Japanese dictionaries also give it the narrower specialist meaning used here: Sino-Japanese readings transmitted before Go-on, illustrated by early man'yōgana such as 意 read as オ (o) and 止 read as ト (to). Hideto Itō lists "old Korean readings", "Sino-Japanese readings in documents of the Suiko court", and the expression Archaic Northeastern Middle Chinese. The last is Christopher I. Beckwith's term for an archaic northeastern variety of Middle Chinese that he reconstructs for what is now northeastern China.

== Early examples ==
Inscriptions from the mid-fifth century onward found in the Japanese archipelago are used as evidence for ko-on. Itō discusses the iron sword bearing the inscription 王賜 ("royal bestowal") from Inaridai no. 1 Kofun in Chiba Prefecture, the Inariyama Sword dated by the usual interpretation to 471, and the contemporary Eta Funayama Sword. Citing an analysis by Mori (森博通), Itō reports that tonal distinctions in old Korean readings were used in the Inariyama inscription to represent the pitch accent of proper names in ancient Japanese, the language of Wa.

The early readings of certain characters differ from those in the later Sino-Japanese layers, Go-on and Kan-on. For instance, neither 止 nor 乃 is read as ト (to) or ノ (no) in later Go-on or Kan-on, but these readings survive in the modern Japanese kana (syllabic symbols) と／ト (derived from 止) and の／ノ (derived from 乃). Itō interprets this as a survival of ko-on in modern Japanese.

Character	Kana and modern reading	Go-on	Kan-on
止	と／ト (to)	シ (shi)	シ (shi)
乃	の／ノ (no)	ナイ (nai)	ダイ (dai)

== Characteristics ==
In his 1911 book A Study of the Origins of Kana (仮名源流考, Kana genryū kō), Tōru Ōya (大矢透) systematically organized the phonographic characters used to record Japanese syllables in Suiko-period documents. He connected special readings such as 移 read as ヤ (ya), 巳 read as ヨ (yo), 里 read as ロ (ro), and 奇 read as カ (ka) with ancient Chinese phonology. The explanations Ōya proposed for these readings include:

- Initial consonants (consonants at the beginning of a syllable)
  - The character 支 is read as シ (shi) in both later Go-on and Kan-on, but in ko-on it is read as キ (ki).
  - Certain characters in the traditional Chinese dental or sibilant category (歯音) are read in ko-on as syllables in the Japanese kana t-row (タ行, the row containing ta, chi, tsu, te and to). Examples include 至 read as チ (chi), 止 read as ト (to), and 侈 read as タ (ta).
  - Using 巷 read as ソ (so) as an example, Ōya explored the possibility that characters in the traditional Chinese laryngeal category (喉音) were read in ko-on as syllables in the kana s-row (サ行: sa, shi, su, se, so), though he also noted that this example might stem from a miswritten character.
- Finals (the part of a syllable following its initial consonant)
  - Certain characters are read as Japanese syllables with the vowel a, such as 奇 (カ, ka), 宜 (ガ, ga), 侈 (タ, ta), and 移 (ヤ, ya).
  - The character 蕤 is used in ko-on for the syllable ヌ (nu), with the vowel u.
  - Certain characters are read as syllables with the vowel e, such as 居 (ケ, ke) and 舉 (ケ, ke).
  - In Suiko-period documents, the character 明 is read as マ (ma).

== Theories of origin ==
Ōya proposed that the character readings of Suiko-period man'yōgana derived from ancient pronunciations of China's Zhou dynasty, and wrote A Study of the Origins of Kana (1911) and A Study of Zhou-period Old Sounds and Evidence from Rhymes (周代古音考及韻徴, Shūdai ko-on kō oyobi inchō, 1914).

Examining records of proper names transcribed with Chinese characters in ancient Korea and Japan, Cho identifies an Old Chinese hypothesis and an ancient Sino-Korean hypothesis among the explanations of ko-on. He argues that ko-on ultimately derives from Old Chinese, but was not transmitted directly from China: its underlying readings may have developed within the Korean phonological system before reaching Japan. Itō similarly places ko-on earlier than Go-on and Kan-on, which are based on Middle Chinese, and argues for transmission through the Korean Peninsula.

Mitsuaki Endō has examined the loss of distinctions between voiced and voiceless initial consonants and the weakening or loss of syllable-final consonants in ancient Korean material, considering their relationship to Japanese character readings from before the seventh century. In another study, he discussed features of early Sino-Korean and Sino-Japanese readings, including a change to -i in the Yu (魚) group of Old Chinese rhymes and traces of an early -s ending associated with the departing tone, a historical Chinese tone category. He also discussed the preservation of ki from before the first palatalization, a sound change involving a shift in consonant articulation toward the palate.

== Limitations of research materials ==
In a 2025 article, Mitsuaki Endō examined personal names, place names, and official titles recorded in Chinese characters in the "Eastern Barbarians" (東夷傳) section of the Records of the Three Kingdoms and related historical sources. He noted that examples from antiquity are few and that his series of studies was still at an early stage, focusing on reading correspondences and possible etymologies. He proposed first collecting possible explanations and postponing detailed phonetic reconstruction until enough examples had accumulated.

== Words with kun readings ==
In kun'yomi, a Chinese character is read using a Japanese word corresponding to its meaning. Some words conventionally read in this way have been proposed as possible early Chinese loanwords. Fumio Tamamura records a hypothesis that treats words such as 馬 (ウマ, uma, "horse"), 梅 (ウメ, ume, "Japanese apricot"), and 竹 (タケ, take, "bamboo") as survivals of ko-on. Taking ウマ (uma) as an example, this hypothesis holds that a preparatory nasal sound m was first added before the initial consonant of Chinese ma to form mma, which later developed into uma. However, Tamamura also notes that it remains difficult to determine whether such words actually derive from Chinese.

== See also ==
- On'yomi
- Old Chinese
- Go-on
- Kan-on
- Korean language
- Sino-Korean vocabulary
