= 2026 Nigerien coup attempt =

Attempted overthrow of Abdourahamane Tiani

Date	28–29 August 2026 (1 day)
Location	Niamey, Niger
Result	Coup failure

Belligerents
Niger; Russia; Algeria	Armed Forces for the Restoration of the Fatherland

Commanders and leaders
(Niger) Abdourahamane Tiani; (Niger) Salifou Modi	Unknown

Units involved
Niger Armed Forces; Presidential Guard; Ministry of Defence; Africa Corps; Algerian People's National Army; Algerian Air Force	Dissident factions of the Niger Armed Forces

Casualties and losses
3+ Presidential Guardsmen killed	Several killed or captured

On 28–29 August 2026, a mutinous faction of the Niger Armed Forces calling themselves the Armed Forces for the Restoration of the Fatherland attempted a coup against President Abdourahamane Tiani in the country's capital Niamey. Gunfire and explosions were reported near the Diori Hamani International Airport, the Presidential Palace, and headquarters of the Office of Radio and Television of Niger. The coup attempt, which state media said was repelled, is believed to have been carried out by young officers within the Nigerien military opposed to the rule of President Tiani.

== Background ==
Niger has undergone six coups d'etat since gaining independence from France in 1960. The most recent coup in 2023 ousted Mohamed Bazoum, the country's first democratically elected leader to succeed a similarly democratically elected leader. It led to the installation of the National Council for the Safeguard of the Homeland (CNSP), a military junta headed by Abdourahamane Tiani, who later became the country's president in 2025. The coup, which occurred in the context of a larger series of coups in Africa, triggered a diplomatic confrontation with the transnational West African organization of ECOWAS, of which Niger was a part.

Paul Melly, an expert on Francophone Africa at Chatham House, stated that many young members of the officer corps are not content with Tiani's rule, stating that "the young officers, if it is them, would be saying: 'Three years ago it was getting better, but look at things now'". In recent years, the country has seen an increase in insurgent activity from the Islamic State's Sahel Province, as well as from al-Qaeda affiliate Jama'at Nusrat al-Islam wal-Muslimin. Both groups had launched two attacks on the Diori Hamani International Airport in the year prior.

A major issue within the Nigerien Armed Forces (FAN) leading up to the mutiny was the discrepancy between the Presidential Guard (GP) and average FAN units. Prior to seizing power in 2023, Tiani was in charge of the Presidential Guard for twelve years. His closeness with the GP meant that the unit received better equipment and better locations compared to average FAN units on the frontlines against ISSP and JNIM, which suffered heavy casualties.

== Coup attempt ==
Over the night of 28–29 August, explosions and gunfire were heard in the Nigerien capital of Niamey, continuing through the morning. Engagements occurred near the Diori Hamani International Airport, the Presidential Palace, and the headquarters of the Office of Radio and Television of Niger. Witnesses reported a "heavy exchange of gunfire", and initial reports suggested there was an attempted coup d'état. They fired on "sensitive sites" for hours, including an air force base near the airport known as Base 101, which hosts the Russian Ministry of Defence's Africa Corps paramilitary organization and command of the Alliance of Sahel States, composed of Niger, Burkina Faso, and Mali. The coup plotters reportedly held Africa Corps mercenaries hostage, and videos online showed armored vehicles being deployed to reinforce the area near the airport. Russia's Africa Corps provided aerial and ground support to the Nigerien government. The Republican Guard, another well-armed unit in the army, was not known to have taken a side until the end of the coup attempt.

The mutineers also attacked the Nigerien presidency, but this attack was repulsed. Bana Wagana Ibrahim, a Nigerien lawmaker and AES parliament member, later claimed that security forces had regained control of the airport; security forces also stated that "terrorists" attacked the airport and attempted to breach the presidential security perimeter, and that some attackers were "neutralized", while others fled, and that security forces had launched search operations. The Nigerien Armed Forces, as well as armored vehicles were deployed to the capital, and the government of Niger issued statements on X and Facebook, urging calm and warned against spreading unverified rumors while security forces continue their operations. Multiple civilians were injured, though an official casualty toll has not been issued. The signal to Télé Sahel was also cut off during the attack.

A statement from a group calling themselves the Armed Forces for the Restoration of the Homeland (FARP) began to circulate on 29 August; it said that Abdourahamane Tiani was no longer in power. The assault involved soldiers from Ouallam, Téra, and Dosso in the southwest of the country; the government stated that the coup attempt had been undertaken by young officers who were disgruntled with the Tiani regime. A unit from Dosso that fought against Tiani's forces was called Agali. A source for the Financial Times (FT) stated that the putschists had seized control of the airport (and the Turkish drones present there), the state television broadcaster, and national radio. However, the putschists issued no official statement regarding their goals. The FT also reported that a diplomat had stated that the government was able to reassert control of downtown Niamey.

By the evening, according to security, members of Niger's Presidential Guard supported by Russian forces, who utilized Kamikaze drones, had recaptured the air base, killing some of the mutineers.

On 30 August, the Algerian Ministry of Defence said it had sent four fighter jets to Niger following unrest, and in an interview with President Abdelmadjid Tebboune on October 3, he said that his country sent fighter jets to Niger in late August to help thwart the coup attempt.

== Aftermath ==
After briefly suspending operations, state television resumed broadcasting later in the day, where General Salifou Modi stated that the situation was under control. The Nigerien government requested assistance from Russia's Africa Corps, and Niger's Presidential Guard later regained control of Base 101. On 30 August, Algeria deployed military aircraft including four Sukhoi Su-30 fighter jets to Niamey, which Niger described as "strategic support". On 31 August, the Nigerien authorities held a funeral for three Presidential Guard members killed in the mutiny.

The Nigerien government seized 382 AK-47 rifles, 36 RPG-7 rocket launchers, 30 PKM machine guns, six 12.7mm caliber weapons, four 14.5mm caliber weapons, four Dragunov sniper rifles, an 82mm mortar, 17 "automatic pistols", 34 Toyota Hilux pickup trucks, two light armored vehicles, one of which was destroyed, several dozen motorcycles, and several "crates of ammunition, dozens of magazines, and communication devices" from the mutineers.

In an interview with RFI, Sahel expert Yvan Guaichoua said that the Russian intervention was crucial to keeping Tiani's regime in power, saying "I don't think it's an exaggeration to say that the Russians saved the day."

On 11 September, Tiani replaced military chief of staff Moussa Salaou Barmou with Mamane Sani Kiaou, with no official reason given.

== Reactions ==
The ruling military junta, the CNSP, called for unity, and later accused France, Benin, and Chad of being involved in the coup attempt. Bana Wagana Ibrahim described the coup as cowardly. The Association of Traditional Chiefs of Niger and Coalition of Trade Unions of Niger condemned the coup attempt, and in Dogondoutchi and Niamey, pro-government rallies were held. Some demonstrators in Niamey waved Russian flags.

The Alliance of Sahel States (AES) stated the alliance had been the target of "betrayal by a group of soldiers" involved in a "destabilization plot" that was ultimately "contained and thwarted". The other members of the AES, Burkina Faso and Mali, condemned the attempted coup and expressed support for Tiani's government. Russia's Ministry of Defence confirmed that it had been involved in suppressing the coup attempt, providing Nigerien forces with ground and aerial support.

Algeria's government stated its "full solidarity and firm support" to Niger, and that it "view[s] overcoming this ordeal and promoting a rapid return to stability" in Niger. Egypt stated that it was closely following the events in Niger, reaffirming its support for Niger's stability, security and territorial integrity. The Government of National Unity of Libya expressed support for Niger's stability, sovereignty and territorial integrity, warning of regional security risks in the Sahel region in light of the events. The Nigerian Ministry of Foreign Affairs stated that it "views with deep concern the current political and security situation" in Niger and that it is "keenly desirous to see that peace, security, democracy and development reign supreme in the country".

The Ministry of Foreign Affairs of Qatar condemned the coup attempt and expressed support for Niger's "legitimate measures" aimed at preserving its sovereignty, security and territorial integrity. The Turkish government stated that it calls for "restraint" and the "preservation of security and stability in Niger", hopes that "calm will be restored as soon as possible", and that Turkey "stand[s] in solidarity with Niger and support[s] its people".
