= COVID-19 pandemic in Niger =

Ongoing COVID-19 viral pandemic in Niger

- Disease: COVID-19
- Pathogen: SARS-CoV-2
- Location: Niger
- First outbreak: Wuhan, China
- Index case: Niamey
- Arrival date: 19 March 2020 (6 years, 7 months, 1 week and 1 day)
- Confirmed cases: 9,931
- Active cases: 729
- Deaths: 315 (updated 18 September 2026)
- Fatality rate: 3.17%

The COVID-19 pandemic in Niger is part of the worldwide pandemic of coronavirus disease 2019 (COVID-19) caused by severe acute respiratory syndrome coronavirus 2 (SARS-CoV-2). The virus was confirmed to have reached Niger in March 2020. Amnesty International reported that journalists have been arrested over reporting about the pandemic.

== Background ==
COVID-19 Response in Niger from International Organization for Migration.

On 12 January 2020, the World Health Organization (WHO) confirmed that a novel coronavirus was the cause of a respiratory illness in a cluster of people in Wuhan, Hubei, China, which was reported to the WHO on 31 December 2019.

The case fatality ratio for COVID-19 has been much lower than SARS of 2003, but the transmission has been significantly greater, with a significant total death toll.

== Timeline ==
=== March 2020 ===
- On 19 March, the first case in the country was confirmed in Niamey, being a 36-year-old man from Nigeria. He had travelled to Lomé, Accra, Abidjan, and Ouagadougou.
- Following this announcement, the airports in Niamey and Zinder were closed to prevent the spread of the coronavirus.
- A third case was confirmed to be a Brazilian woman who entered the country on 16 March.
- Niger reported a total of seven cases on March 25, including the first death related to COVID-19 in the country on 24 March. The death occurred in Niamey, being a 63-year-old Nigerian national.
- There were 34 confirmed cases and 3 deaths in March, leaving 31 active cases at the end of the month.

=== April to December 2020 ===
- On 5 May 2020, Nigerien public television station Télé Sahel announced that Nigerien Labor Minister Mohamed Ben Omar had died from COVID-19.
- There were 685 new cases in April, 239 in May, 117 in June, 61 in July, 40 in August, 20 in September, 24 in October, 328 in November, and 1720 in December. The total number of cases stood at 719 in April, 958 in May, 1075 in June, 1136 in July, 1176 in August, 1196 in September, 1220 in October, 1548 in November, and 3268 in December.
- There were 452 recoveries in April, leaving 235 active cases at the end of the month. The number of recovered patients rose to 839 in May, 943 in June, 1028 in July, 1107 in September, 1137 in October, 1210 in November, and 1802 in December, leaving 235 active cases at the end of April, 55 at the end of May, 65 at the end of June, 39 at the end of July, 19 at the end of August, 20 at the end of September, 14 at the end of October, 266 at the end of November, and 1362 at the end of December.
- The death toll increased by 29 to 32 in April, doubled to 64 in May, rose to 67 in June, 69 in July, 72 in November, and 104 in December.
- Issaka Assane Karanta, 75, Governor of Niamey Capital District (since 2018), died of COVID-19 on 24 December.

=== January to December 2021 ===
- Niger's vaccination campaign began on 29 March.
- There were 1,249 new cases in January, 233 in February, 281 in March, 205 in April, 184 in May, 78 in June, 149 in July, 212 in August, 159 in September, 368 in October, 631 in November, and 398 in December. The total number of cases stood at 4,517 in January, 4,740 in February, 5,021 in March, 5,226 in April, 5,410 in May, 5,488 in June, 5,637 in July, 5,849 in August, 6,008 in September, 6,376 in October, 7,007 in November, and 7,405 in December.
- The number of recovered patients stood at 3,755 in January, 4,250 in February, 4,641 in March, 4,851 in April, 5,083 in May, 5,206 in June, 5,345 in July, 5,538 in August, 5,754 in September, 6,006 in October, 6,613 in November, and 6,926 in December, leaving 603 active cases at the end of January, 318 at the end of February, 193 at the end of March, 184 at the end of April, 135 at the end of May, 89 at the end of June, 97 at the end of July, 112 at the end of August, 53 at the end of September, 157 at the end of October, 135 at the end of November, and 204 at the end of December.
- The death toll rose to 159 in January, 172 in February, 187 in March, 191 in April, 192 in May, 193 in June, 195 in July, 199 in August, 201 in September, 213 in October, 259 in November, and 275 in December.
- Modeling carried out by the WHO's Regional Office for Africa suggests that due to under-reporting, the true cumulative number of infections by the end of 2021 was around 10.9 million while the true number of COVID-19 deaths was around 14,200.

=== January to December 2022 ===
- There were 1,244 new cases in January, 105 in February, 56 in March, 133 in April, 103 in May, 41 in June, 28 in July, 216 in August, 74 in September, 23 in October, 6 in November and 72 in December. The total number of cases stood at 8,649 in January, 8,754 in February, 8,810 in March, 8,943 in April, 9,046 in May, 9,087 in June, 9,115 in July, 9,331 in August, 9,405 in September, 9,428 in October, 9,434 in November and 9,506 in December.
- The number of recovered patients increased to 7,947 in January, 8,432 in February, 8,484 in March, 8,524 in April, 8,712 in May, 8,759 in June, 8,779 in July, and 8,967 in December, leaving 404 active cases at the end of January, 15 at the end of February, 18 at the end of March, 110 at the end of April, 24 at the end of May, 17 at the end of June, 25 at the end of July, and 224 at the end of December.
- The death toll rose to 298 in January, 307 in February, 308 in March, 309 in April, 310 in May, 311 in June, 312 in August, 313 in September, 314 in October and 315 in December.

=== 2023 ===
- There were 425 confirmed cases in 2023, bringing the total number of cases to 9,931. The death toll remained unchanged.

== See also ==
- COVID-19 pandemic in Africa
- COVID-19 pandemic by country and territory
