= 2011 Nigerien coup attempt =

Coup d'état attempt in Niger

Date	July 12–13
Location	Niger
Result	Failure of the coup, 10+ arrested

Belligerents
Niger Armed Forces	(Niger) Dissenting faction of the armed forces

Commanders and leaders
(Niger) Mahamadou Issoufou	

The 2011 Nigerien coup attempt, taking place in a two-day period from July 12 through July 13, was a failed coup d'état against democratically elected Niger President Mahamadou Issoufou by more than ten perpetrators, including a major and a lieutenant. The first time Niger officials confirmed the coup attempt, President Issoufou stated that "The law will be applied in all its severity to those (who), without any objective reason, have decided to put an end to the choice of the people" in a televised address to the nation on August 3, 2011, coinciding with the country's 51st anniversary of independence.

Issoufou's presidency, established in March 2011 following fair and free elections, marked the end of military rule initiated by a coup in February 2010, which had ousted former President Mamadou Tandja. According to the AFP news agency, the president's efforts to combat corruption, including dismissal of officials and the creation of a governmental body to address misuse of public funds, had caused discontent within military quarters connected to the old military junta regime.

During a meeting with Barack Obama, the US President reaffirmed America's continued support to Niger and other African countries for striving progress in spite of facing challenges, saying the US will be a "stalwart partner."
