= 2023 in Niger =

- Decades: 2000s; 2010s; 2020s
- See also: Other events of 2023; Timeline of Nigerien history

This article lists events from the year 2023 in Niger.

== Incumbents ==
- President of Niger: Mohamed Bazoum (until July 26).
  - Amadou Abdramane (Military leadership following the military coup July 26–28)
  - Hassoumi Massaoudou (incumbent, disputed)
  - Abdourahamane Tiani (incumbent, disputed)
- Prime Minister of Niger: Ouhoumoudou Mahamadou (until the military coup July 26).
  - Ali Lamine Zeine (incumbent, disputed)
- Cabinet of Niger: Ouhoumoudou Mahamadou's Government.

== Events ==
- July 26: 2023 Nigerien coup d'état
  - Soldiers from Niger's Presidential Guard detain President Mohamed Bazoum inside the Presidential Palace in Niamey. Entrances to government ministries are also blocked.
  - Soldiers announce on state television that President Mohamed Bazoum has been removed from power. The country's borders are closed and a nationwide curfew is declared.
- July 27: Supporters of the military coup against President Mohamed Bazoum set fire to the headquarters of the ruling Nigerien Party for Democracy and Socialism (PNDS-Tarayya) in Niamey, Niger.
- July 28:
  - Nigerien army general Abdourahamane Tiani declares himself the new President of Niger following Wednesday's coup d'état.
  - The United Nations suspends humanitarian aid to Niger in response to the coup.
- July 29:
  - Beginning of 2023 Nigerien crisis
- July 30:
  - West African regional bloc ECOWAS announces a no-fly zone over Niger.
  - ECOWAS threatens to "take all measures necessary", including the use of force, to reinstate the government of Niger if ousted President Mohamed Bazoum is not released and reinstated within a week.
  - The military junta regime warns against any foreign intervention in the country, saying that "we want to once more remind ECOWAS or any other adventurer, of our firm determination to defend our homeland".
  - Chadian president Mahamat Déby visits Niamey in order to meet with Nigerien government officials to address the crisis.
- July 31: Niger's military junta accuses France of wanting to intervene by force to reinstate ousted President Mohamed Bazoum, a day after ECOWAS gave an ultimatum for Bazoum's reinstatement.
- August 1: France and Italy begin the evacuation of French, Italian and other European nationals from Niger.
- August 3: Senegal pledges to contribute troops if the Economic Community of West African States decides to intervene militarily in Niger in response to the recent coup d'état.
- August 11: The West African bloc ECOWAS announces an emergency summit after Niger's government rejected an ultimatum to restore the previous president.
- August 16: Seventeen soldiers are killed and 20 more injured during an ambush against a military vehicle in Koutougou.
- August 22: The African Union's Peace and Security Council votes to suspends Niger's membership with immediate effect.
- August 25: The ruling Nigerien military junta orders the ambassadors of France, Germany, Nigeria, and the United States to leave the country. France rejects the ultimatum, claiming they do not recognize its authority, while the US claims it has received no request to withdraw its personnel from Niger.
- August 26: The ruling Nigerien military government orders the Niger Armed Forces to go on maximum alert, citing an increased threat of attack.
- September 5: France and Niger's military government begin talks on the possible withdrawal of French troops from the West African country.
- September 16: The military governments of Niger, Mali, and Burkina Faso sign a mutual defense pact named the Alliance of Sahel States in case of internal rebellion or external military aggression.
- September 28: Jihadist insurgents kill at least ten Nigerien soldiers in Kandadji, Tillabéri Region. Seven soldiers are later killed, and five others are injured in a vehicle accident while travelling to reinforce the army unit under attack.
- October 2: At least 29 soldiers are killed during an ambush by Islamic extremists in the Tahoua Region, involving suicide car bombs and bombings. Several attackers are killed in a counter-offensive.
- October 10: France begins withdrawing all its forces from Niger after the ruling military government ordered them to leave.
- October 20: The French Armed Forces confirms that 1,500 troops will exit Niger by the end of the year, following the military junta's request.
- October 22: A fuel truck explosion in Tirmini killed six people and injured about 30. The explosion occurred after a fuel truck collided with another vehicle.
- December 15: An ECOWAS court orders former President Mohamed Bazoum to be freed from arrest and reinstated as president.

== Sports ==
- July: Niger at the 2023 World Aquatics Championships

== See also ==
- COVID-19 pandemic in Africa
- 2023 Nigerien Crisis
