= Public holidays in Niger =

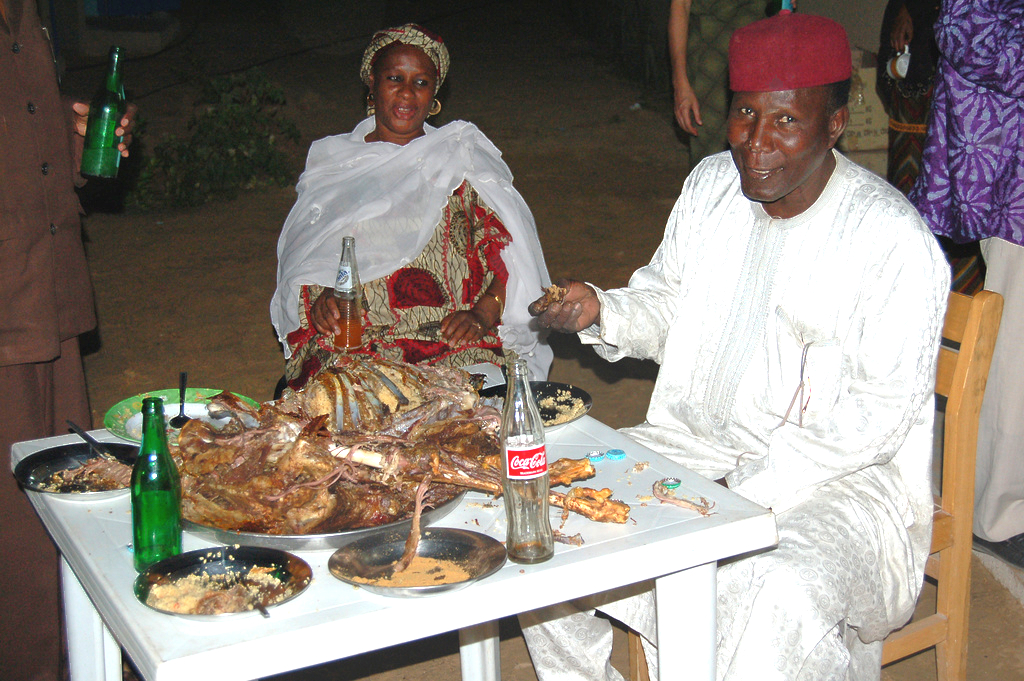
A traditional courtyard feast of mutton or goat in Diffa, around Mouloud, April 2006.

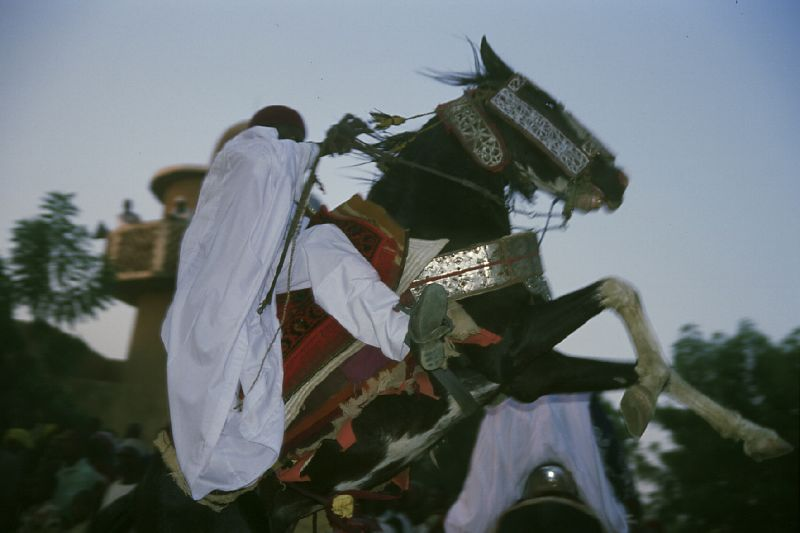
Horsemen at the traditional Eid al Fitr festival at the Sultanate of Damagaram, Zinder.

The government and people of Niger observe twelve official public holidays. These include international commemorations, the commemoration of important dates in the history of Niger, and religious holidays. Both Christian and Muslim holidays are observed as official public holidays.

Muslim holidays are dependent on the Islamic calendar, and—like Christian Easter—move from year to year. Some Muslim holidays are also dependent upon astronomical sightings (e.g.: the observance of moonrise for Ramadan). National commemorations and secular international holidays are fixed on the Gregorian calendar, the standard civil calendar used in Niger as most of the world.

Nigeriens celebrate a number of other holidays, festivals, and commemorations which are not public holidays. Some are yearly civic commemorations, some religious, ethnic, or regional festivals which may be widely celebrated only by specific groups or in specific areas. Other yearly events, such as cultural festivals, markets, or sporting events may be much anticipated events without being legal holidays.

== Official holidays ==
Below are the twelve official public holidays recognized by the Government of Niger. Businesses, schools, and public services are closed on these days. They are often dates of public festivals, political speeches, and large gatherings.

=== Fixed holidays ===
Date	African name	Remarks
January 1	New Year's Day	
March 26	Refoundation Day	Commemoration of Niger 2025 refoundation
April 24	Concord Day	Commemoration the peace accords ending the Tuareg Rebellion in 1995
May 1	Labour Day	Commemoration of Niger observance of International Workers' Day
July 26	Anniversary of the CNSP Coup	Commemoration of Niger 2023 Constitution of Niger
August 3	Independence Day	Commemoration of Niger 1960 independence from France
December 18	Republic Day	Commemoration of Niger 1958 semi-independent under France
December 25	Christmas Day	

=== Moveable holidays ===
The following are official public holidays whose date may vary, according to their corresponding calendar. Some Muslim holiday observance is also dependent upon local astronomical observance.

Month	Name and Translation	Remarks
April-May	Easter Monday	Christian holiday of the Resurrection, breaking the Lenten fast.
Muharram 1	Islamic New Year	Muharram
Rabi' al-Awwal 12	Mawlid	The Prophet's Birthday, locally Mouloud: celebrated with overnight gatherings of families and communities.
last week of Ramadan	Laylat al-Qadr	Nightly prayers and reflection in the one of last night of Ramadan.
Shawwal 1	Eid al Fitr	Evening feasts and parties to celebrate the breaking of the Ramadan fast. Regional gatherings and festival include the carnival festivities at the Sultan's Palace in Zinder.
Dhu al-Hijjah 10	Eid al Adha	Commemoration of Abraham's sacrifice: feasting on Lamb or Goat. Especially important family gathering in Niger.

== Other festivals ==
Nigeriens celebrate a number of holidays and festivals. Many are regional, recognized partially or only locally by government, or are traditions of specific ethnic groups. They include:

- The Cure salée : annual gathering of Tuareg and Fulani nomadic clans at Ingall (August or September);
- Guérewol : The "Bororo" Fulani matchmaking festival at the end of the rainy season (August or September). Famous for the traditional makeup and dancing of young Fulani men eager to woo a spouse, Guérewol take place both in conjunction with the Cure salée, as well as at other traditional gather spots of nomadic people in northern Niger;
- "National Day of Nigerien Women" -- "Journée nationale de la femme nigérienne" (13 May). Commemorates a 1992 march by women in Niamey during the National Conference period, demanding greater involvement of women in national institutions. Made a "National Commemoration" 25 November 1992.
- "Festival national de la jeunesse, des sports et de la culture": Government sponsored national youth sport and cultural competition (annual);
- National championship of Lutte Traditionnelle (traditional wrestling). Contestants progress from Regional championships to team completion which awards a prestigious trophy—a ceremonial sabre—to one region;
- "Foires agro-sylvo pastorales": annual Agropastoral governance and cultural forum, Niamey;
- "Prix Dan Gourmou" : Annual music competition and festival, Niamey;
- "FIMA", "Festival International de la Mode Africaine" (International Festival of African Fashion) every two years in Niamey;
- "Rencontres Théâtrales du Niger": National theater festival;
- "Festival international de conte"/ "Gatan - Gatan": Festival of traditional story telling;
- "Salon international de l'artisanat pour la femme" (SAFEM): Women Artisans festival, Niamey;
- "Festival de l'Aïr" (27–29 December): Music and arts festival at Iférouane;
- " Hotoungo " at Gangui, a local traditional farmers gathering and festival;
- " Bianou " festival at Agadez;
- " Wassan Kara " festival at Zinder;
- The " Guetna " at Tassara, Annual festival among the nomadic Diffa Arabs.;
- Annual Anza animist religious festival at Massalata - Konni, near Dogondutchi;
- Traditional fishermen's festival at Karay-Kopto on the River Niger;
- " Gossi ", a Soninké animist festival at Karma-Songhaï on the River Niger;
- "Fête de la girafe" (15 September), Kouré, near Niamey, celebrating the West African Giraffe native to the area;
- le " Sharow " Puel festival;
- Traditional boxing tournaments ("Faka") each year after harvest in December or January, Zinder Region;
- " Mani Hori ": festival of traditional Songhai women's crafts, each year after harvest in December or January.
