= 2022 in Niger =

- Decades: 2000s; 2010s; 2020s
- See also: Other events of 2022; Timeline of Nigerien history

This article lists events from the year 2022 in Niger.

== Incumbents ==
- President of Niger: Mohamed Bazoum
- Prime Minister of Niger: Ouhoumoudou Mahamadou
- Cabinet of Niger: Ouhoumoudou Mahamadou's government

== Sports ==
- Niger at the 2021 Islamic Solidarity Games
- Niger at the 2022 World Aquatics Championships
- Niger at the 2022 World Athletics Championships

== See also ==
- COVID-19 pandemic in Africa
