= 2015 in Niger =

- Decades: 1990s; 2000s; 2010s; 2020s
- See also: Other events of 2015; Timeline of Nigerien history

The following lists events that happened during 2015 in Niger.

== Incumbents ==
- President: Mahamadou Issoufou
- Prime Minister: Brigi Rafini

== Events ==
=== January ===
- January 9 - Refugees flee Borno State, Nigeria, following the Boko Haram massacre in the town of Baga. 7,300 flee to neighbouring Chad while over 1,000 are trapped on the island of Kangala in Lake Chad. Nigeria's army vows to recapture the town, while Niger and Chad withdraw their forces from a transnational force tasked with combating militants.
- January 17 - Violence surrounding various protests against Charlie Hebdo leaves five protesters dead as well as some churches set ablaze in Niger.

=== February ===
- February 9 - Boko Haram launch a raid on a prison in the town of Diffa in Niger. Authorities repel the attack.
- February 17 - A warplane bombs a funeral ceremony in Niger killing 30 civilians.
