= 2010 in Niger =

- Decades: 1990s; 2000s; 2010s; 2020s
- See also: Other events of 2010; Timeline of Nigerien history

Events in Niger in 2010 include:

== Incumbents ==
- President: Mamadou Tandja (until February 18), Salou Djibo (starting February 18)
- Prime Minister: Ali Badjo Gamatié (until February 18), Mahamadou Danda (starting February 18)

== Events ==
=== February ===
- February 18 - A military junta named the Supreme Council for the Restoration of Democracy carries out a coup d'état, suspending the constitution and detaining President Mamadou Tandja.
- February 20 - 2010 Nigerien coup d'état
  - The African Union suspends Niger following this week's coup d'état.
  - Thousands of people take part in a second day of celebrations in the capital.

=== March ===
- 8 March - Five Nigerien soldiers and three jihadists are killed, as Al-Qaeda in the Islamic Maghreb (AQIM) attack a Nigerien military base in Tilwa, Tillabéri Region.

=== April ===
- April 23 - A Frenchman and his Algerian driver are kidnapped by armed men in Niger.
- April 28 - Niger faces total crop failure worse than that of 2005, according to United Nations Under-Secretary-General for Humanitarian Affairs and Emergency Relief Coordinator John Holmes.

=== May ===
- May 21 - Nigeriens flee across the border into Nigeria due to a food crisis in Niger.
- May 24 - Niger proposes reforms that would see only those with a university degree be allowed to run in presidential elections and parliamentary candidates be under the age of seventy and have some form of secondary education. Opposition groups say this discriminates against the 80 per cent of the population that is illiterate.

=== June ===
- June 21 - Major aid agencies Oxfam and Save the Children both launch $10 million (£6.7 million) appeals for Niger where drought is common at the moment and half the country has no food.

=== August ===
- August 10 - The Niger River bursts its banks forcing 5,000 people to lose their homes and crops.
- August 14 - The United Nations states Niger faces its worst hunger crisis in history, worse than 2005 when thousands of people were left to starve to death.
- August 21 - The charity Save the Children says the food crisis in Niger is being made worse by hoarders selling grain at higher prices than most people can afford.
- August 24 - Oxfam warns of a "double disaster" following flooding compounding a recent drought and food crisis in Niger.

=== September ===
- September 20 - France sends dozens of soldiers equipped with Breguet Atlantique and Mirage aircraft to Niamey in its search for 7 kidnapped hostages.
- September 21 - al-Qaeda in the Islamic Maghreb claims responsibility for kidnapping five French workers in Niger.

=== October ===
- October 14 - Colonel Abdoulaye Badie, the second in command in Niger's military government, the Supreme Council for the Restoration of Democracy, is arrested.
- October 19 - Salou Djibo sacks his intelligence chief Seyni Chekaraou following the arrest of several members of the ruling Supreme Council for the Restoration of Democracy junta on suspicion of planning a coup d'état.

=== November ===
- November 3 - Constitutional referendum results in Niger show that 90% of voters approve a return to civilian rule from the Supreme Council for the Restoration of Democracy military junta.
