= 2011 in Niger =

- Decades: 1990s; 2000s; 2010s; 2020s
- See also: Other events of 2011; Timeline of Nigerien history

The following lists events that happened during 2011 in Niger.

== Incumbents ==
- President: Salou Djibo (until April 7), Mahamadou Issoufou (starting April 7)
- Prime Minister: Mahamadou Danda (until April 7), Brigi Rafini (starting April 7)

== Events ==
=== January ===
- January 8 - Two French hostages kidnapped in Niger on Friday are killed during a rescue attempt by the Nigerien military.
- January 31 - Presidential and parliamentary elections are held in Niger following one year of military rule.

=== June ===
- June 9 - Cheaper new meningitis vaccinations reduce cases in Africa, with Burkina Faso, Mali and Niger recording the lowest number of cases.

=== November ===
- November 14 - Libya's National Transitional Council criticizes Niger's offer of asylum to ousted Libyan dictator Muammar Gaddafi's son, Saadi Gaddafi, for whom Interpol has issued an arrest warrant, saying Niger's position is "hostile" and a "challenge" to Libya.
