= 2018 in Niger =

- Decades: 1990s; 2000s; 2010s; 2020s
- See also: Other events of 2018; Timeline of Nigerien history

This article lists events from the year 2018 in Niger.

== Incumbents ==
- President: Mahamadou Issoufou
- Prime Minister: Brigi Rafini

== Events ==
=== Sports ===
- 2018 Niger Cup

== Deaths ==
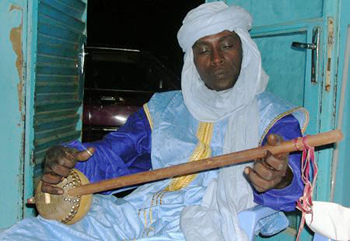
Mamane Barka

- 20 February – Lucien Bouchardeau, football referee (b. 1961).
- 4 July – Boukary Adji, politician, Prime Minister 1996 (b. 1939) .
- 29 October – Mariama Keïta, journalist and feminist activist (b. 1946).
- 21 November – Mamane Barka, musician (b. 1958/1959).

== Links ==
Media related to 2018 in Niger at Wikimedia Commons
