= Maradi school fire =

2021 disaster in Niger

- Date: 8 November 2021
- Location: Maradi, Niger
- Deaths: 26
- Injuries: 14+

On 8 November 2021, a classroom in a primary school caught fire in the city of Maradi in southern Niger. As a result, 26 children were killed and more than fourteen were injured.

== Background ==
Niger is one of the poorest countries in the world, school buildings are usually made of weeds and straw. Straw huts are frequently used as "temporary overflow structures" since Niger's school system is overwhelmed by the amount of children needing education. On 13 April 2021, a school fire in Niamey killed at least 20 pupils. The secretary general of the Niger Teachers' Union, Issoufou Arzika, said that the union had warned government officials of the risks of schools built out of flammable materials. He said that "[i]t is better to hold classes under trees than in straw huts, which have become flammable graves for pupils."

== Fire ==
According to Maradi Governor Chaibou Aboubacar, the fire in three classrooms in the private school killed 26 preschoolers between the ages of 5 and 6. Fourteen pupils were also injured in the incident, five of them in critical condition.

The cause of the fire is yet to be ascertained. However, the fire spread rapidly as the school building.

== Aftermath ==
Chaibou Aboubacar declared three days of mourning in Maradi. UNICEF Niger representative Stefano Savi offered his condolences to the families of the victims and said that UNICEF would continue to work towards ensuring the safety of Niger's schools.
