= 2014 in Niger =

- Decades: 1990s; 2000s; 2010s; 2020s
- See also: Other events of 2014; Timeline of Nigerien history

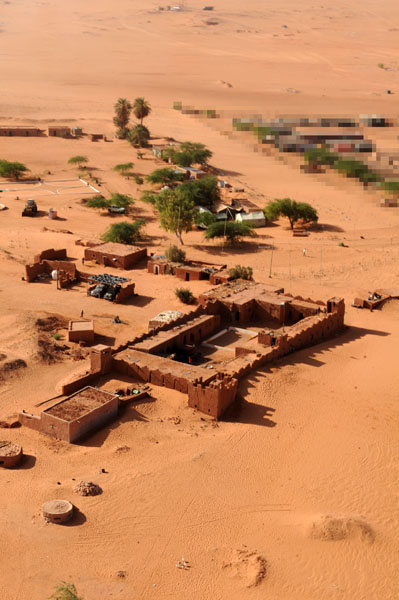
Aerial picture of Madama fort in November 2014

The following lists events that happened during 2014 in Niger.

== Incumbents ==
- President: Mahamadou Issoufou
- Prime Minister: Brigi Rafini

== Events ==
=== March ===
- March 6 - Niger deports Saadi al-Gaddafi, son of Muammar al-Gaddafi, to Libya.

=== May ===
- May 17 Benin, Cameroon, Chad, Niger, and Nigeria join to combat Boko Haram.

=== October ===
- October 27 - An outbreak of cholera kills 51.

=== November ===
- November 24 - Boko Haram strikes the northeastern Nigerian town of Damasak, killing 50 and leading to over 3,000 people to flee across the border into Niger.
