= 2021 Nigerien coup attempt =

2021 coup attempt in Niger

Coordinates: 13.5167°N 2.1167°E

2021 Nigerien coup d'état attempt
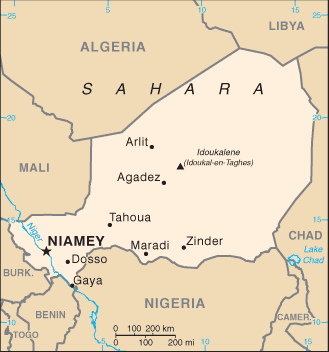
- Map of Niger
Date	31 March 2021
Location	Niamey, Niger
Result	Failure of the coup

Belligerents
Niger Armed Forces; Presidential Guard	(Niger) Dissenting faction of the armed forces

Commanders and leaders
(Niger) Mahamadou Issoufou (Niger) Abdourahamane Tiani	(Niger) Sani Saley Gourouza

The 2021 Nigerien coup d'etat attempt occurred on 31 March at around 3 am WAT (2 am UTC) after gunfire erupted in the streets of Niamey, the capital of Niger, two days before the inauguration of president-elect Mohamed Bazoum.

The coup attempt was staged by elements within the military, and was attributed to an Air Force unit based in the area of the Niamey Airport. The alleged leader of the plot was Captain Sani Saley Gourouza, who was in charge of security at the unit's base. After the coup attempt was foiled, the perpetrators were arrested.

== Context ==
The coup attempt took place while Niger was mired in the War in the Sahel, with marked terrorism and inter-ethnic violence. Sahel countries received France's help against terrorists via Operation Barkhane, with controversial actions. In 2020, a coup d'état overthrew the government of Malian President Ibrahim Boubacar Keïta. Niger successfully went through the 2020–21 Nigerien general election cycle with incoming peaceful presidential transition between two democratically elected presidents, a context unprecedented in Niger. However, the defeated opponent and ex-president Mahamane Ousmane contested the election results and lodged a legal appeal with the constitutional court, which was rejected. On March 21, 2021, jihadist factions led a massacre in Tilia, where 137 villagers were killed.

== Events ==
According to Cyril Payen of France 24, "heavy weapon fire was heard for half an hour in the area of the presidential palace. But the Presidential Guard repelled this attack and the situation seems to have come under control", and the noise of the fighting woke up locals around 3am (local time). The majority of the perpetrators were arrested by the government but some, including the leader of the coup Sani Saley Gourouza, are still at large.

== Reactions ==
Nigerian President Muhammadu Buhari described the act as "naive and old-fashioned". The President of the African Union and the Economic Community of West African States condemned the attempted coup, a sentiment which was also echoed by other African countries, including Chad and Algeria.

== Aftermath ==
The democratic transition went as planned, the swearing-in of the new president Mohamed Bazoum occurring two days after the attempted coup. However, he was ousted in the 2023 Nigerien coup d'état by members of the presidential guard and the military led by Abdourahamane Tiani, who ironically led the presidential guard in defeating the 2021 coup.
