= Commune III (Niamey) =

Coordinates: 13°31′24″N 2°07′46″E

- Commune
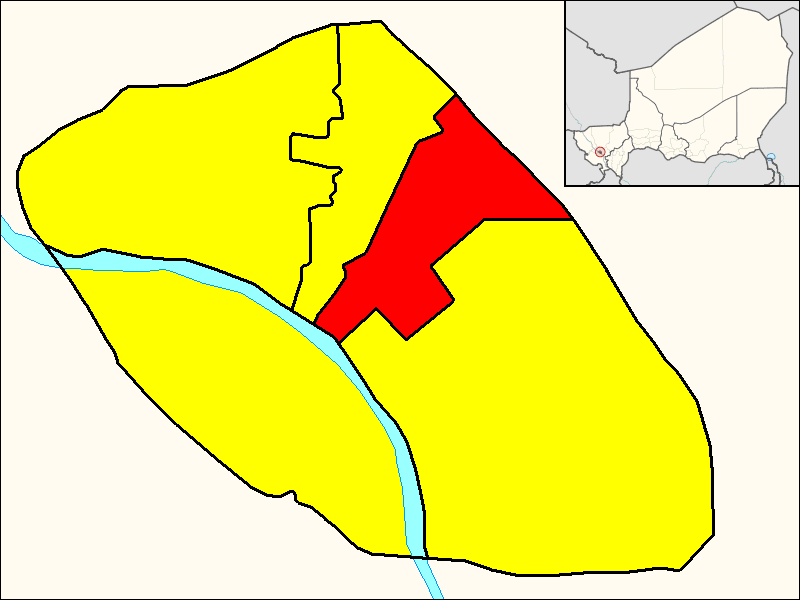
- Commune III within Niamey
- Country: Niger
- Region: Niamey
- Time zone: UTC+1 (WAT)

Commune III (Niamey), also known as Niamey III, is an urban commune in Niger. It is a commune of the capital city of Niamey.

== Quartiers and villages ==
Niamey III contains 16 quartiers:

- Bani Fandou II
- Banizoubou
- Boukoki IV
- Cité Caisse
- Cité Fayçal
- Couronne Nord
- Kalley Centre (Amirou)
- Kalley Est
- Kalley Nord (Abidjan)
- Kalley Sud
- Lacouroussou
- Madina
- Nouveau Marché
- Poudrière
- Sabon Gari
- Terminus

It contains 7 villages:

- Kongou Gorou
- Kongou Gorou Tondi
- Mekirey
- Kongou Gorou Balley Do
- Kongou Gorou II
- Kongou Gorou Tourakou
- Kongou Gorou Kimba Ide
