= Commune I (Niamey) =

Coordinates: 13°32′32″N 2°04′41″E

- Commune
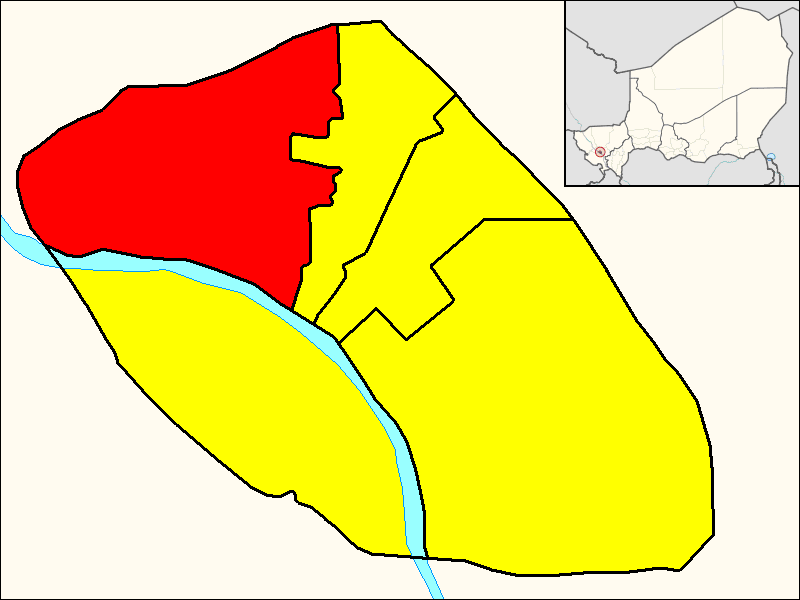
- Commune I within Niamey
- Country: Niger
- Region: Niamey

Population
  - Estimate (October 1, 2020): 273,043
- Time zone: UTC+1 (WAT)

Commune I, also known as Niamey I, is an urban commune in Niger. It is a commune of the capital city of Niamey. Niamey I joined the UNESCO Global Network of Learning Cities in 2025.

== Quartiers and villages ==
Niamey I contains 18 quartiers:

- Bobiel
- Bobiel II
- Bobiel III
- Cité Chinoise
- Cité Francophonie
- Foulan Koira
- Goudel
- Kouara Kano Nord
- Koubia
- Plateau I
- Plateau IV
- Riyad
- Sabara
- Satu
- Sonuci Fenifoot
- Yantala (Recasement)
- Yantala Bas
- Yantala Haut

It contains 8 villages:

- Gabagoura
- Gorou
- Gorou Banda
- Kossèye
- Losso Goungou
- Soudouré
- Tondibia
- Tondi Koirey
