= Agency for Aerial Navigation Safety in Africa and Madagascar =

African agency for air traffic control

- Agence pour la sécurité de la navigation aérienne en Afrique et à Madagascar
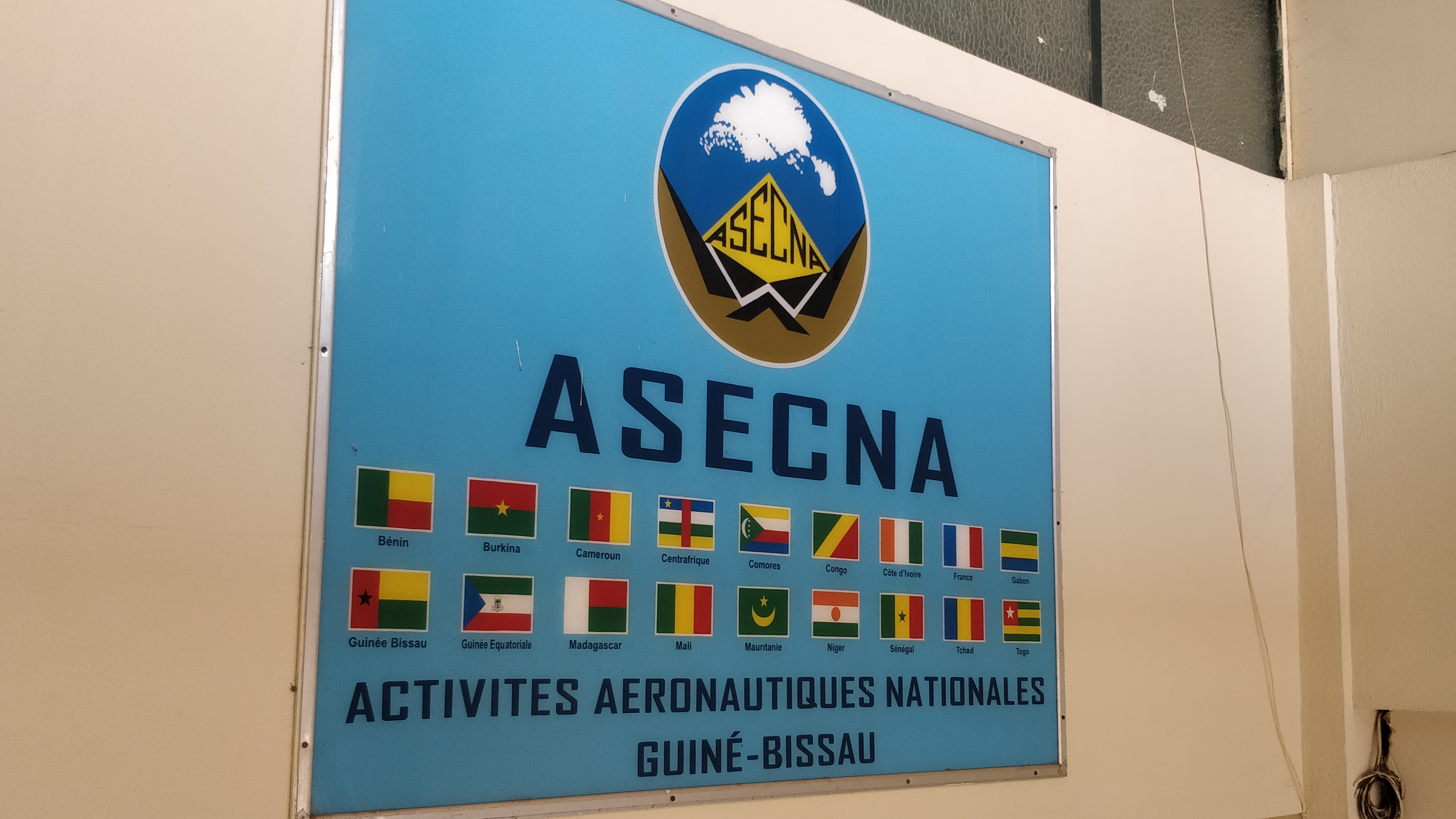
- ASECNA sign at Bissau Airport, Bissau, Guinea-Bissau

- Map of member states in Africa
- Nickname: ASECNA
- Formation: December 12, 1959; 66 years ago
- Type: Intergovernmental organization
- Headquarters: 32, avenue Jean-Jaurès BP 3144, Dakar, Senegal
- Members: 19, France and 18 African nations
- Official language: French
- Director General: Prosper Zo'o Minto'o
- Chairman of the Board of Directors: Jean Lamy
- Chairman of the Committee of Ministers of ASECNA: Hervé Yves Hehomey

The Agency for Aerial Navigation Safety in Africa and Madagascar (L'Agence pour la Sécurité de la Navigation aérienne en Afrique et à Madagascar, ASECNA) is an air traffic control agency based in Dakar, Senegal.

It manages 16.1 million square kilometres of airspace (1.5 times the size of Europe) covering six Flight Information Regions (FIRs) – Antananarivo, Brazzaville, Dakar Oceanic and Terrestrial, Niamey and N’Djamena. ASECNA Air Traffic Control centres are based at international airports in each of these cities.

In July 2008, a strike by ASECNA staff in Gabon disrupted air traffic in Cameroon and elsewhere.

== Member states ==
- Benin
- Burkina Faso
- Cameroon
- Central African Republic
- Chad
- Comores
- Equatorial Guinea
- France
- Gabon
- Guinea-Bissau
- Ivory Coast
- Madagascar
- Mali
- Mauritania
- Niger
- Republic of Congo
- Rwanda
- Senegal
- Togo
