= June 2026 Diori Hamani International Airport attack =

Terrorist attack in Niger

- Part of the Islamist insurgency in Niger
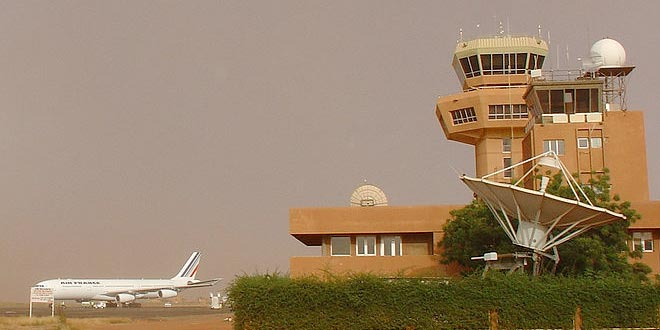
- Diori Hamani Airport in 2005
Date	18 June 2026 c. 6:00 a.m. to c. 8:00 a.m.
Location	Diori Hamani International Airport, Niamey, Niger 13°28′27″N 2°10′36″E
Result	Nigerien government victory

Belligerents
Niger	Jama'at Nusrat al-Islam wal-Muslimin

Strength
Unknown	42+

Casualties and losses
11 killed	22 killed 20 arrested
- 2 civilians killed, 4 injured

On 18 June 2026, militants attacked Diori Hamani International Airport in Niamey, Niger, killing 13 people and injuring four others; 22 attackers were also killed, and 20 suspects were arrested. Jama'at Nusrat al-Islam wal-Muslimin (JNIM) claimed responsibility for the attack later that day.

The attack was the second to take place at the airport in 2026. The attack in January resulted in 20 deaths and four injuries.

== Background ==
=== Diori Hamani International Airport ===
Diori Hamani International Airport is an international airport and military airbase in Niamey, Niger's capital. It is the largest airport in the country, having served 363,093 passengers in 2019. The air traffic control is operated by the ASECNA, which bases one of its five air traffic zones for the continent at Niamey.

=== Perpetrators ===
Al-Qaeda offshoot Jama'at Nusrat al-Islam wal-Muslimin is the main group behind a surge in militant jihadist attacks across several West African nations, especially Burkina Faso, Niger and Mali. It formed in Mali in 2017 as a coalition of five jihadist militant groups. In the first half of 2025, JNIM carried out over 280 attacks in Burkina Faso, double the number for the same period in 2024. The group has claimed to have killed almost 1,000 people across the Sahel since April, almost all in Burkina Faso. It is one of the deadliest militant groups in Africa.

== Attack ==
The gunmen took two taxis and a van to a security checkpoint a few hundred metres from the airport, before trying to enter the terminal. Residents said they had finished morning prayers at about 6 a.m. when explosions and heavy gunfire occurred at the airport. The attackers, some of whom wore explosive belts, were dispersed in the surrounding neighbourhoods. Civilians picked up machetes and sticks to defend themselves. The airport vicinity was placed on lockdown. The attack lasted two hours, with security forces launching a manhunt for any remaining attackers.

Authorities said 22 attackers were killed and 20 suspects were arrested. A large cache of weapons, including RPG-7 grenade launchers, AK-47 rifles, explosives, grenades, communications equipment and thousands of rounds of ammunition, was seized.

The Ministry of Defence said eleven soldiers and two civilians were killed, with four others being wounded.

== Aftermath ==
Jama'at Nusrat al-Islam wal-Muslimin claimed responsibility for the attack in a brief statement published via its official media arm, the Az-Zallaqa Foundation. Hours after the attack, the National Civil Aviation Agency said the airport was operating normally.

== Reactions ==
Several entities and surrounding nations condemned the attacks. The Algerian Ministry of Foreign Affairs strongly condemned the attack and reaffirmed its full solidarity with the government and people of Niger. African Union chairperson Mahmoud Ali Youssouf also condemned the attack and wished the injured victims a speedy recovery. Additionally, the United States Embassy in Niamey strongly condemned the attack and commended Niger's Security and Defense Forces for their response.

Niger's military government claimed the attack was carried out by "armed mercenaries under the funding of French president Emmanuel Macron". France, however, denied the claim.

The attack "highlights a dangerous escalation in both the capability and ambition of these groups, marking a departure from localized rural insurgencies to coordinated strikes on vital national infrastructure", according to the Armed Conflict Location and Event Data (ACLED). Ibrahim Yahaya Ibrahim, deputy project director of the International Crisis Group, said that the attack was part of a larger inclusion of cities in attacks by militant groups in the Sahel compared to rural areas.
