= Route nationale 1 (Niger) =

N1 road

Location
- Country: Niger

Highway system
- Transport in Niger

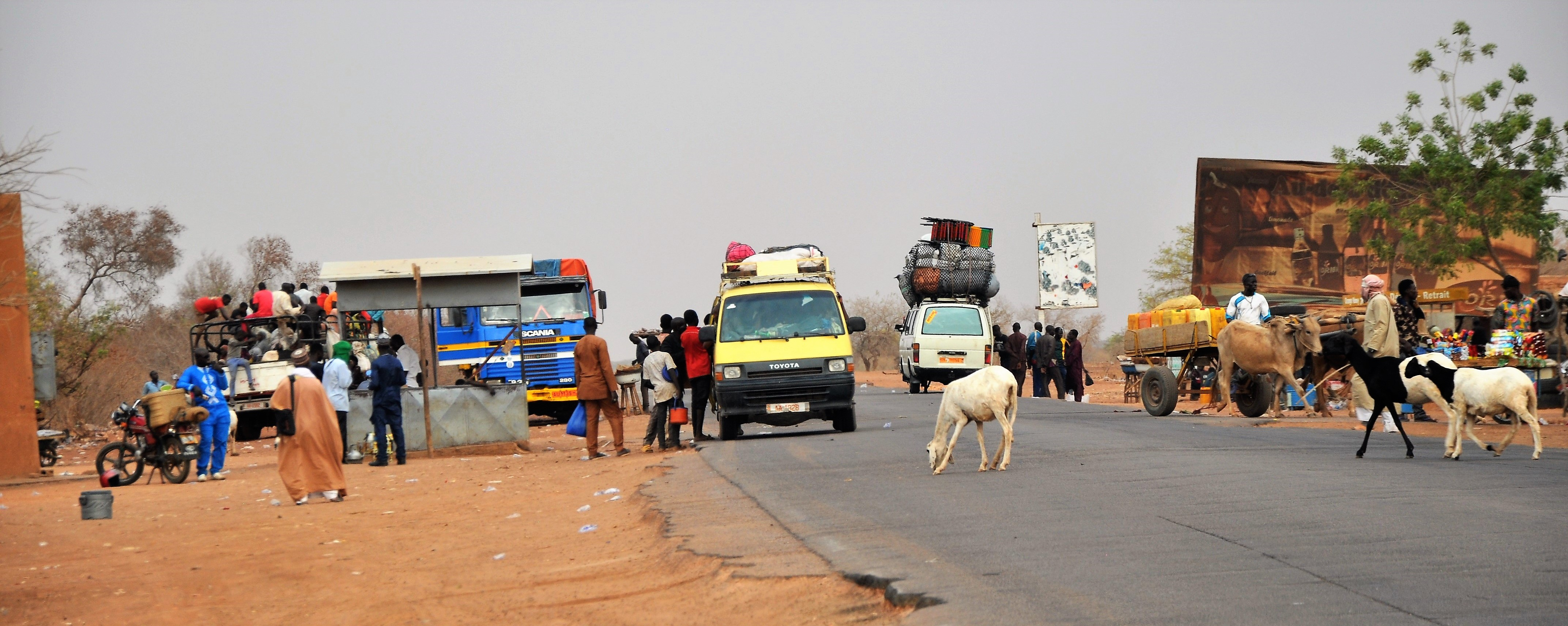
Traffic checkpoint on the RN1 at Kouré, 60 km southeast from the capital Niamey

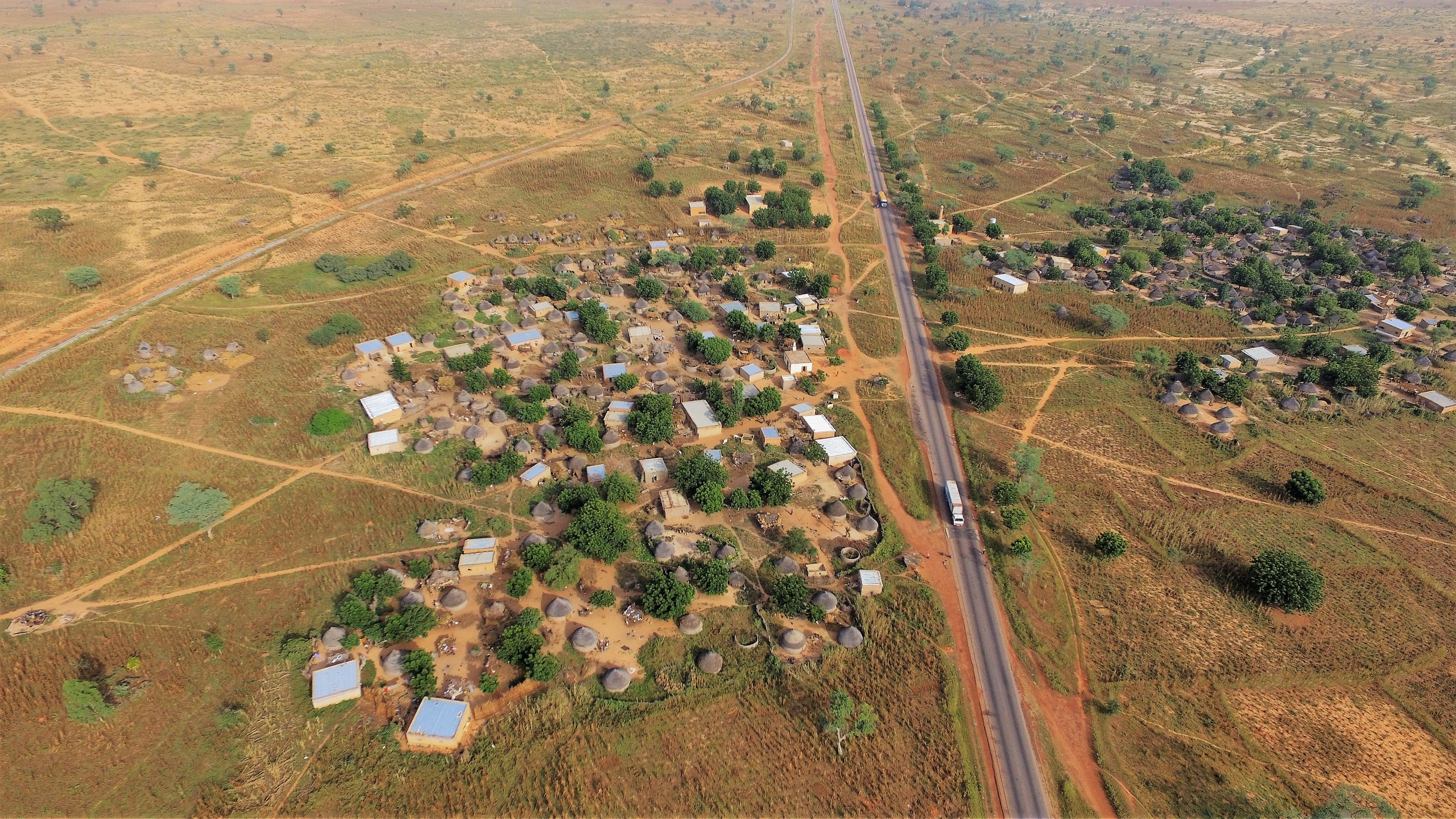
The RN1 at Gonoubi, about halfway between Niamey and Dosso

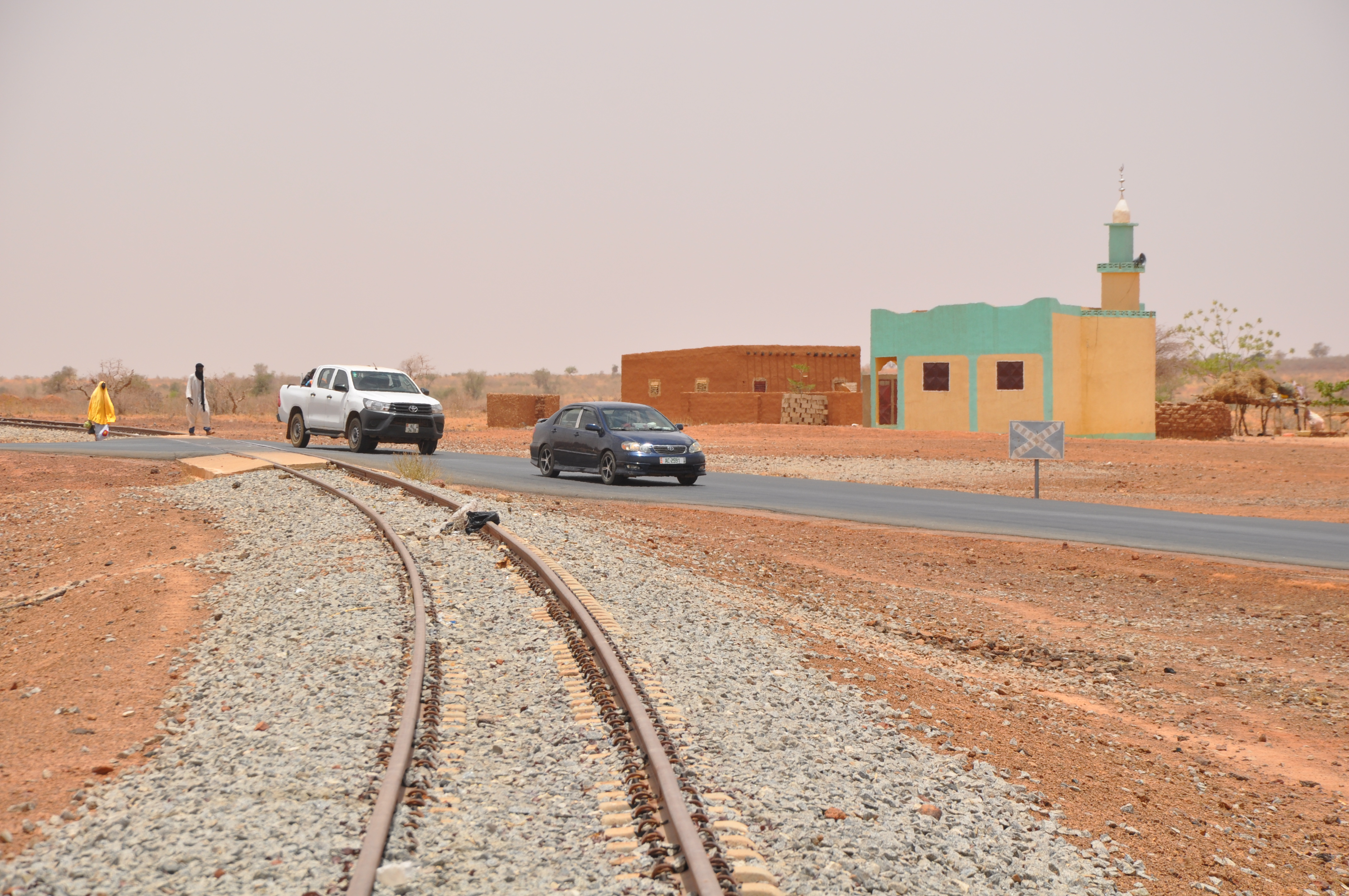
The RN1 crossing the Niamey-Dosso railway at Gado Kouara

The Route Nationale No. 1 is an important highway in Niger. It connects the east of the country to the west. RN1 runs approximately 1,200 km (750 mi) from Koutougou on the Mali border in the west to N'Guigmi in the east, via Tillabery, Niamey, Dosso, Maradi, Zinder, and Diffa. The first large paved section, between Gouré and N'Guigmi, was surfaced in 1971–72. This section, in the distant and sparsely populated east, is now the most degraded section and in part completely eroded. It was named the "Route de l'Unité" ("the Unity Highway") in the 1970s. By 1980, it was joined by the second longest all-weather road in Niger, the "Uranium Highway," running from Niamey to Arlit in the far north.

== See also ==
- Transport in Niger
