= Diori Hamani International Airport =

International Airport serving Niamey, Niger

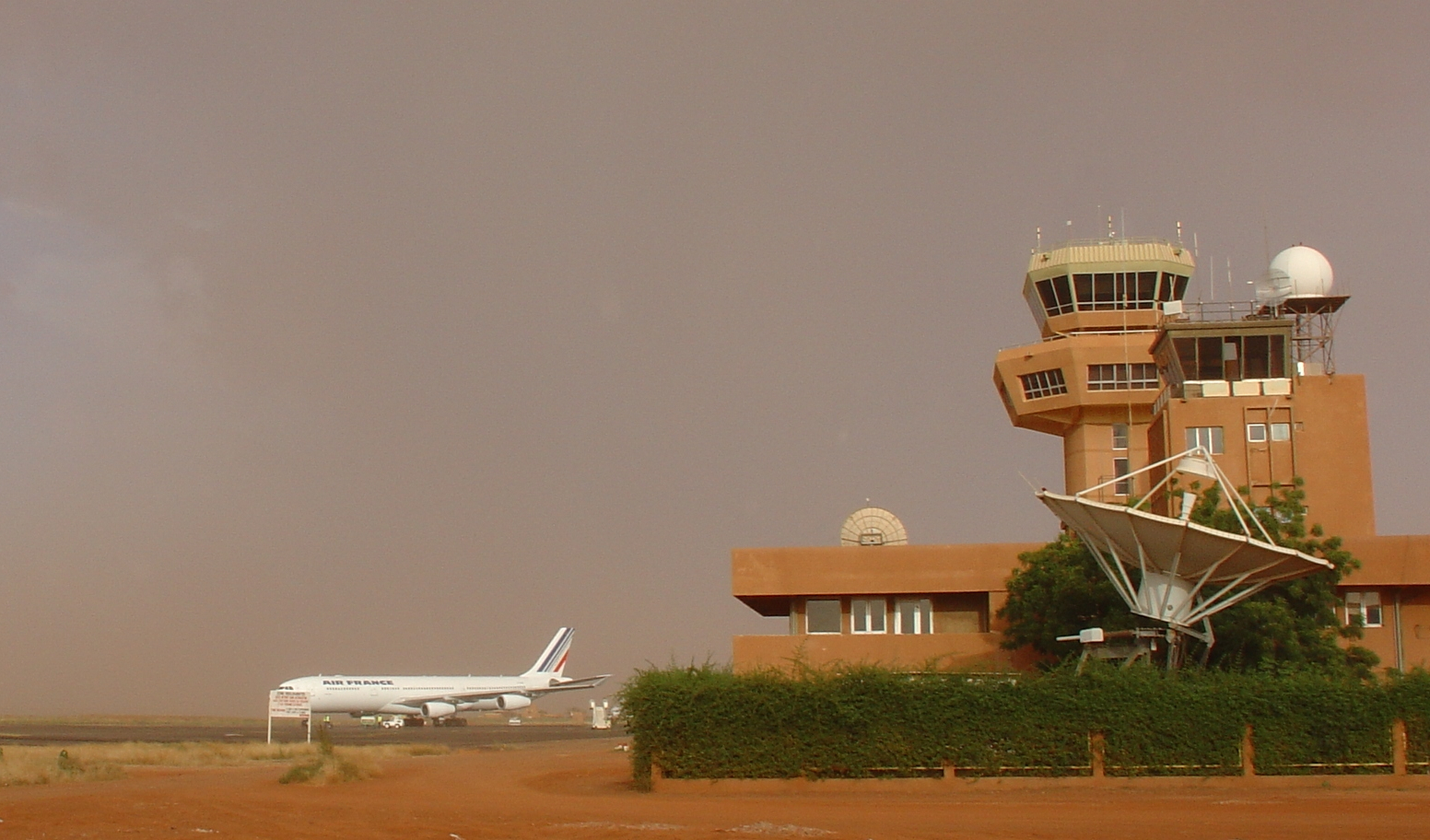
- IATA: NIM; ICAO: DRRN

Summary
- Airport type: Military/Public
- Owner: Transports de Niamey
- Operator: Summa Airports Niger SARLU
- Serves: Niamey, Niger
- Location: Niamey, Niger
- Hub for: Niger Airlines
- Elevation AMSL: 732 ft (223 m)
- Coordinates: 13°28′54″N 002°10′13″E
- Website: niameyairport.com

Map
- Location within Niger

Runways
Direction	Length		Surface
Direction	m	ft	Surface
09R/27L	3,800	12,467	Asphalt
09L/27R	3,000	9,843	Asphalt

Statistics (2013)
- Passengers: 165,000
- Sources: Agence pour la Sécurité de la Navigation aérienne en Afrique et à Madagascar

Diori Hamani International Airport (French: Aéroport international Diori-Hamani) (IATA: NIM, ICAO: DRRN) is an international airport serving Niamey, the capital of Niger. It is located 9 km (5.6 mi) from Niamey in the south-eastern suburbs of the city, along the Route Nationale 1, the major highway linking Niamey with the east of the nation. The airport complex also includes the major base for the Armed Forces of Niger's "Armee d'Air".

== Overview ==
In 2019, the airport served 363,093 passengers. The air traffic control for NIM is operated by the ASECNA, which bases one of its five air traffic zones for the continent at Niamey. The airport is named after Hamani Diori (1916–1989), the first President of Niger.

ASECNA operates the African School for Meteorology and Civil Aviation/Ecole Africaine de la Météorologie et de l'Aviation Civile at the Niamey airport complex, as well as in the Plateau quarter of Niamey city centre. Founded in 1963, EAMAC trains civil aviation professionals and aviation meteorologists from across Africa.

== Base Aérienne 101 ==
The Niger Air Force maintains Base Aérienne 101, which is collocated with Diori Hamani International Airport. It has been variously used by American, French, and Russian armed forces as a base for operations and training missions. The former American and French bases, both established in 2013, were located at adjacent parts of the airport.

In 2013, U.S. African Command spokesman Benjamin Benson confirmed that U.S. air operations conducted from Base Aérienne 101 at Diori Hamani International Airport were providing "support for intelligence collection with French forces conducting operations in Mali and with other partners in the region." In July 2013, The New York Times reported that the deployment had expanded from one Predator UAV to daily flights by a detachment of two larger General Atomics MQ-9 Reaper remotely piloted aircraft, supported by 120 U.S. Air Force personnel. The MQ-9 Reapers were scheduled to be relocated to Niger Air Base 201 in 2018. Italy placed troops at the American base in 2018, supporting European Union interests in the region.

Around 2013, two Ku band arrays were constructed at the airport to allow for communication with EADS Harfang UAVs. The French Air and Space Force Escadron de Drones 1/33 Belfort operated three MQ-9 Reapers out of the base starting in January 2014 in support of Operation Barkhane. France also deployed Dassault Mirage 2000D aircraft from the French Air Forces detachment (DETAIR) to the base. France made Niamey a centre of operations during Operation Serval of the Mali War. Germany also had 50 troops in Niamey in 2020 as part of the United Nations peacekeeping mission in Mali. A French Operational Transport Group was also based at the airbase as of 2020, controlling Lockheed C-130J Hercules aircraft instead of the previous Transall C-160s. In 2022, French assets were moved from Gao to a forward operating base in Niamey, which had 1,000 troops garrisoned and became France's largest center of operations in West Africa.

The Nigerien Air Force maintains two Cessna-208 Caravans equipped for ISTAR operations at the airport.

In the aftermath of the 2023 Nigerien coup d'état, both France and the United States were told to withdraw their military personnel from the country. French forces departed from the airbase in December 2023. In May 2024 Russian troops moved in to one of the airports' hangars while some U.S. troops were still on the same property, but not in same buildings. On 7 July 2024, the U.S. completed withdrawal of all troops from the airbase.

On 29 January 2026, the Islamic State staged an attack on the base; gunfire was reported at the airport and FlightRadar24 showed a number of aircraft diverting away from the airport. Authorities later said that gunmen attacked the base, leaving 20 attackers including a French national dead, 11 others arrested and four soldiers injured. It blamed France, Benin and Ivory Coast for sponsoring the assault, adding that it was repelled with the help of Russian soldiers stationed at the base. Satellite photos showed damage to buildings with the military area of the airport.

On 18 June 2026, JNIM militants attacked the airport. The fighting lasted nearly two hours before the attackers were repelled by Nigerien security forces, who sealed off the area. Eleven soldiers, two civilians and 22 attackers were killed, with 20 more suspects arrested.

On 29 August 2026, a mutinous faction of the Niger Armed Forces calling themselves the Armed Forces for the Restoration of the Fatherland attacked the airport as part of a coup attempt. The attackers had targeted Base 101 and the presidential palace, with the intention of kidnapping soldiers.

== Airlines and destinations ==
Airlines	Destinations
Air Algérie	Algiers
Air Burkina	Ouagadougou
Air Côte d'Ivoire	Abidjan, Ouagadougou
Air France	Paris–Charles de Gaulle
Air Senegal	Bamako, Dakar–Diass
ASKY Airlines	Cotonou, Lomé, Ouagadougou
Ethiopian Airlines	Addis Ababa, Ouagadougou
Fly Oya	Tripoli–Mitiga
Libyan Airlines	Tripoli–Mitiga
Royal Air Maroc	Casablanca
Sky Mali	Bamako, Gao
Tunisair	Abidjan, Tunis
Turkish Airlines	Istanbul, N'Djamena

== Ground transportation ==
=== Road ===
Diori Hamani International Airport is situated on Route Nationale 1, which connects it to the city of Niamey 9 km (5.6 mi) to the northwest, as well as to Dosso, Maradi, Zinder, Goure, Diffa, and N'guigmi to the east.

=== Rail ===
The railway track passing by the airport, which connects it to Niamey railway station and Dosso, is abandoned since its construction (and will not be operational in the near future).

== See also ==
- Transport in Niger
