= Palatalization =

Palatalization may refer to:

- Palatalization (phonetics), the phonetic feature of palatal secondary articulation
- Palatalization (sound change), the process of a sound change to a more palatal sound
