= January 2026 Diori Hamani International Airport attack =

Terrorist attack in Niger

Diori Hamani International Airport attack
- Part of the Islamist insurgency in Niger and Islamic State-linked attacks in 2026
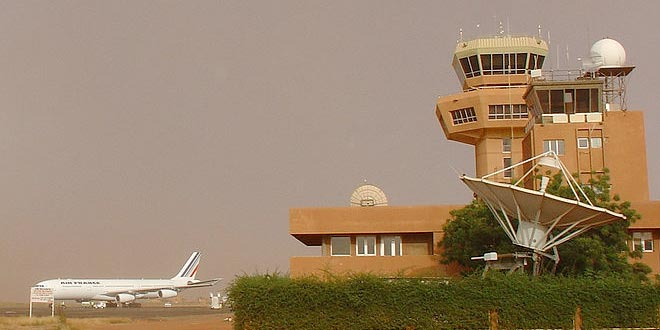
- Diori Hamani International Airport in 2005
Date	29 January 2026
Location	Air Base 101, Diori Hamani International Airport, Niamey, Niger 13°28′54″N 002°10′13″E
Result	IS tactical victory: IS destroys at least 5 military aircraft.
Territorial changes	IS temporarily occupies airport facilities before withdrawing

Belligerents
Islamic State	Niger; Russia

Commanders and leaders
Unknown	(Niger) Omar Tiani; (Niger) Salifou Modi

Units involved
Sahel Province; West Africa Province	Niger Armed Forces; Niger Air Force; (Russia) Africa Corps

Casualties and losses
Per Niger: 20 killed; 11 captured	Per Niger: (Niger) 4 injured; Per IS: (Niger) 24 killed; (Niger) Multiple aircraft destroyed; (Russia) 4 killed

On 29 January 2026, the Islamic State's Sahel Province and West Africa Province launched a large scale attack on Diori Hamani International Airport in Niamey, Niger. The attack resulted in heavy casualties on both sides, including the deaths of twenty IS fighters and the capture of eleven others.

== Background ==
In 2025, militants affiliated with the Al Qaeda-affiliated Jama'at Nusrat al-Islam wal-Muslimin (JNIM) and the Islamic State (IS) stepped up their campaigns across the Sahel, placing additional strain on the region's already fragile security environment. The escalation further weakened stability in Niger, which had been a key security partner of Western countries until the military coup in 2023.

== Attack ==
In the early hours of 29 January 2026, heavy gunfire and explosions were reported in the capital around the airport and the adjacent military base. A group of 30+ militants, reportedly riding motorcycles, using drones and mortars, launched a coordinated assault on Air Base 101 and the civilian side. The attack continued for 2 hours before Nigerien ground and air forces, with support from the Russian Africa Corps stationed at the base, regained control of the site 20 minutes after engaging the militants.

A passenger plane operated by Air Côte d'Ivoire, located on the tarmac of the airport, was attacked during the clashes, resulting in damage to the aircraft's fuselage and right wing. Two Asky Airlines planes were also damaged.

According to the Nigerien government, 20 attackers were killed and 11 were captured; four Nigerien soldiers were wounded during the engagement. At least five military aircraft, including one helicopter, were destroyed during the attack.

Some sources alleged a much higher death toll for both Nigerien and Russian security forces. According to unofficial reports, 24 Nigerien soldiers and three Russian mercenaries were killed in the clashes. This estimate remains unconfirmed.

=== Islamic State involvement ===
The Islamic State-linked Amaq News Agency claimed that its militants had carried out a "surprise and coordinated attack" on the airport in Niamey. IS claimed the attack had caused "significant damage", later releasing photos and a video of the assault.

Analysts have noted Hausa and Kanuri speakers in footage recorded by Amaq News Agency, two languages spoken mainly in Nigeria. Which could indicate cooperation between the Sahel and West Africa Provinces during the assault.

== Reactions ==
Niger's military government accused France, Benin, and the Ivory Coast of allegedly sponsoring the attack. General Omar Tiani, who came to power following a coup in 2023, made the allegations in a televised address, naming French President Emmanuel Macron, Beninese President Patrice Talon, and Ivorian President Alassane Ouattara. No evidence was presented to support the claims.

On 30 January 2026, the United States added Niger to the Level 4 ‘Do Not Travel’ list, which warns of armed conflict and terrorism that can harm foreigners.

== Aftermath ==
Another airport attack occurred in Niger at Tahoua Airport on 8 March 2026, where several attackers were killed, and five were arrested.

The airport was again targeted by militants on 18 June 2026 when JNIM attacked the airport. The fighting lasted nearly two hours before the attackers were repelled by Nigerien security forces, who sealed off the area. 11 soldiers, two civilians and 22 attackers were killed, with 20 more suspects arrested and four civilians reported as injured.

== See also ==
- 2024 Bamako attacks
