= Agency for Technical Cooperation and Development =

French humanitarian organization

Acted
- Founded: 1993
- Type: Non-governmental organization (NGO)
- Headquarters: Paris
- Origins: Kabul, Afghanistan
- Key people: Marie-Pierre Caley (CEO); Frédéric Roussel (cofounder and head of development); Frédéric de Saint-Sernin (executive vice-CEO); Aurélien Daunay (executive vice-CEO since 2020)
- Budget: 621 million euros (2023)
- Staff: 7,804
- Website: https://www.acted.org/en/

Acted is a French international solidarity non-governmental organization (NGO), founded in 1993. It is headquartered in Paris.

Acted works in crisis management in the areas of humanitarian aid, the environment and development.

== Activities ==
The organisation supports 27 million people worldwide (2023), providing assistance in emergency situations, but also for the long-term stabilization and rehabilitation of affected populations.

With humanitarian aid, environment and development, Acted is guided by the slogan "Think local, Act global": using an understanding of local areas and contexts to develop and implement actions that build on local knowledge, structures and capacities.

Since 2012, the NGO has been developing impact investment and "charity bonds". Between 2012 and 2020, it raised 19 million euros this way.

Funded by institutional partners such as BHA, ECHO, CDCS and USAID, Acted was one of the top 10 humanitarian organizations supported by USAID in 2023.

Since 2017, sustainable development and ecosystem protection have been considered and integrated into the NGO's activities, with new programs launched to meet sustainable development goals and support populations affected by climate change. At the same time, the NGO is also beginning to measure its own impact on the environment through its direct and indirect emissions and its supply chain, in order to put in place appropriate measures to reduce it.

Following on from this, in 2020 Acted implements its 3ZERO strategy to work towards a world of Zero Poverty, Zero Carbon and Zero Exclusion. Between 2021 and 2023, Acted's portfolio of environmental programs increased by 30%, notably in the context of its THRIVE initiative: a collaborative and resilient approach aimed at combating desertification and restoring ecosystems.

=== Countries of intervention ===
As of December 2023, Acted is present in:

- Afghanistan
- Armenia
- Bangladesh
- Burkina Faso
- Colombia
- Côte d'Ivoire
- Central African Republic
- Chad
- Colombia
- Republic of the Congo (RotC; Congo-Brazzaville)
- Democratic Republic of the Congo (DRC; Congo-Kinshasa)
- Ethiopia
- Haiti
- Iraq
- Jordan
- Kenya
- Kyrgyzstan
- Lebanon
- Libya
- Mali
- Moldova
- Myanmar
- Mozambique
- Niger
- Nigeria
- Occupied Palestinian Territory
- Pakistan
- Philippines
- Senegal
- Somalia
- South Sudan
- Sri Lanka
- Sudan
- Syria
- Tajikistan
- Thailand
- Tunisia
- Turkey
- Uganda
- Ukraine
- Uzbekistan
- Yemen

== History ==
=== Creation ===
Acted was created in 1993, in Afghanistan, by Marie-Pierre Caley and Frederic Roussel. First, the organization used mapping to support local humanitarian actors in order to better understand territorial solidarity. The Afghan humanitarian crisis pushes the organization to start its own humanitarian actions.

In order to meet the food and heating needs in Kabul, Acted is helping the local population to revive the coal mines located in the nearby mountains with the help of the World Food Program. Through these mines, the population of Kabul has able to heat themselves and restart the production in bakeries in order to feed the city.

Subsequently, Acted expanded to the rest of Central Asia, to Tajikistan (1996), Uzbekistan (1999), Kyrgyzstan (2000) and Pakistan (2005).

=== Timeline of activities ===
- 1993: Acted founded in Afghanistan.
- 1996: Acted expands its activities to Tajikistan, Uzbekistan and Kyrgyzstan.
- 1997: Assists populations affected by the civil conflict of the First Congo War in the Republic of the Congo (Brazzaville).
- 1998: Emergency response to Hurricane Mitch in Nicaragua.
- 1999: Helps people in Kosovo affected by the Kosovo War.
- 2003
  - Begins programmes in the Middle East to support people in Iraq.
  - Acted intervenes in South Kivu in the Democratic Republic of Congo to support displaced people.
- 2004
  - Launches emergency activities in Haiti to support the most vulnerable.
  - Launches operations in Chad to support Sudanese refugees fleeing the war in Darfur.
- 2005
  - Launches emergency response and reconstruction activities in South Asia following the 2004 Indian Ocean earthquake and tsunami, with operations in India, Indonesia and Sri Lanka.
  - Acted opens a coordination office in Jordan to support its operations in the Middle East.
  - The NGO responds to the 2005 Kashmir earthquake in Pakistan.
- 2006
  - Responds to the Darfur crisis in Sudan with infrastructure-building operations,
  - Intervenes in Kenya to support populations affected by drought
  - Launches operations in Lebanon.
- 2007
  - Operations begin in the Occupied Palestinian Territory (West Bank) and the Central African Republic.
  - Emergency response to flooding in Uganda.
- 2008
  - The NGO launches operations for Myanmar populations affected by Cyclone Nargis.
  - Acted intervenes in the Gaza Strip with emergency food aid and reconstruction operations following the Fatah–Hamas conflict (Gaza war).
  - Launch of operations in Somalia in response to the food and agricultural crisis.
- 2009
  - Acted implements AIDS prevention activities with Pharmaciens Sans Frontières and supports the inclusion of young people in Cambodia.
  - The NGO combats the food crisis in Zimbabwe.
- 2010
  - Acted mobilizes teams in Niger to respond to the food crisis
  - Implements risk reduction and disaster preparedness programs in Vietnam.
  - The NGO responds to the emergency caused by the January 2010 earthquake in Haiti.
- 2011: Begins program in Libya, Jordan, and Côte d'Ivoire.
- 2012
  - Acted teams respond to the emergency following Typhoon Bopha in the Philippines.
  - Responds to the refugee crisis in South Sudan.
  - Responds to the food and nutrition crisis in Mali.
- 2013
  - Emergency response to Typhoon Haiyan in the Philippines.
  - Acted opens a coordination office in Bangkok and launches operations to support Burmese refugees in Thailand.
- 2014: Acted intervenes against food insecurity and to strengthen agricultural systems in the Matam region of Senegal.
- 2015
  - Acted responds to the emergency in Nepal following the 2015 earthquakes, deploying teams to bring water, food and shelter to the most remote areas. The NGO has supported nearly 450,000 people in Nepal.
  - Acted launches emergency operations assisting those affected by the Yemeni civil war
  - Emergency operations launched in northern Nigeria in response to the deteriorating security situation.
- 2016
  - Acted responds to the emergency in Haiti following Hurricane Matthew by providing water, food and shelter, and contributing to the response to the cholera epidemic with drinking water access interventions.
  - Mobilization of Acted teams in support of refugees following the Battle of Mosul in Iraq.
- 2017
  - Acted teams mobilize in Ukraine to support populations affected by the conflict in the east of the country.
  - Start of operations in Bangladesh in response to the conflict in Myanmar's Arakan state and the mass arrival of Rohingya refugees in Cox's Bazar.
  - Start of operations in Turkey in support of Syrian refugees.
- 2018: Acted responds to the 2018 earthquake in Sulawesi, Indonesia.
- 2019
  - Acted launches operations in Colombia to respond to the Venezuelan refugee crisis,
  - Operations in Burkina Faso to promote access to water, hygiene and sanitation for the most vulnerable,
  - and in Tunisia to support inclusive and sustainable development.
  - Opening of the first 3ZERO home in Manila.
- 2020
  - Emergency response to support populations affected by the 2020 Beirut explosions in Lebanon. The NGO launches an appeal for donations for the reconstruction of Beirut.
  - Acted begins work in Ethiopia.
- 2022
  - Emergency response to support populations affected by the Russian invasion of Ukraine.
  - Support for drought victims in Ethiopia and flood victims in Pakistan
  - Inauguration of the PERALTA school in Niger
  - Opening of a 3ZERO home in Tajikistan.
- 2023
  - Emergency response to earthquakes in Morocco, in Libya, and in Turkey and Syria.
  - Opening of a 3ZERO home in Sri Lanka and Myanmar.

== Milestones ==
=== Acted Group ===
In 2005, Acted separated its microfinance operations from its development and emergency aid programs, launching OXUS. As a social enterprise committed to providing financial services to people excluded from the banking system, the OXUS network is committed to creating and delivering the most effective microfinance services and providing sustainable livelihoods to its beneficiaries.

In 2008, Acted founded Convergences: a platform for reflection, mobilization and advocacy, to promote the Sustainable Development Goals (SDGs) and the fight against poverty, exclusion and climate change worldwide. With over 300 partner organizations from all sectors, the non-profit acts to stimulate reflection and action, disseminate best practices and encourage the co-construction of innovative partnerships with a strong societal impact.

Since 2008, Convergences has been organizing its World Forum, which has established itself as a must-attend event for those working for change towards a fairer, more sustainable world. Several thousand professionals from all sectors (companies and SSE players, non-profit organizations, public institutions, financial players, the scientific and innovation sector, citizen and youth networks, and the media...) gather in Paris, to work together to develop responses to social, economic and environmental challenges around the world.

Since 2017, Convergences has also been organizing Forums in different countries and regions around the world, such as Syria, the Philippines, Mexico and Niger.

Acted founded IMPACT Initiatives in 2010 and continues to provide support services, notably in countries where IMPACT initiatives are deployed and in the implementation of joint programs. IMPACT aims to shape practice and influence policy in humanitarian and development contexts, in order to have a positive impact on the lives of people and communities.

IMPACT co-constructs and shares knowledge, tools and practices that enable key humanitarian actors to make evidence-based decisions. IMPACT implements evaluation and monitoring programs, surveys and diagnoses, as well as organizational capacity-building programs in direct partnership with humanitarian actors or via its inter-agency initiatives.

=== Charters, Transparency and Compliance ===
Since December 2011, Acted has been certified by the Comité de la Charte du Don en Confiance, an organization that monitors the financial responsibility of non-profit.

Acted signed the International Red Cross and Red Crescent Movement's Code of Conduct for Non-Governmental Organizations in Disaster Relief. Acted is also a member of CHS Alliance (2015), Start Fund (2016), Alliance2015 (2008), VOICE, ICVA, Interaction, Coordination Sud.

Acted was the second signatory of the Charter of Humanitarian Organizations for Climate and Environment and is a member of the Global Evergreening Alliance, which works to restore degraded landscapes through nature-based solutions. Acted is also a member of the Réseau Environnement Humanitaire (REH), the Réseau Environnement et Action Humanitaire (EHAN), and the Joint Initiative for Sustainable Humanitarian Assistance Packaging Waste Management.

Acted is also part of the global CCCM group (Cluster for Camp Coordination and Management) and a member of its Strategic Advisory Group.

In order to ensure the compliance of its activities and to fight against fraud, corruption and to reinforce its zero tolerance towards various forms of harassment and aggression, Acted has a "Transparency Line" for its beneficiaries, partners and teams. This enables them to report any shortcomings or problems encountered, so that an appropriate investigation and response can be launched.
