= Republic Day (Niger) =

National holiday of Niger

Republic Day Fête de la République du Niger Fête tournante du 18 décembre
- Observed by: Niger
- Type: National
- Celebrations: Festivals, Political addresses, Military Parade, parties.
- Date: 18 December
- Next time: 18 December 2026
- Frequency: annual

Republic Day is a national holiday in the Republic of Niger commemorated on 18 December.

== Importance of date ==
Although not the date of formal, complete independence from France, 18 December marks the founding of the Republic and creation of the Presidency of the Republic of Niger, following the constitutional changes of the French Fifth Republic, and the elections of 4 December 1958 held across the French colonial possessions. Nigeriens consider this date to be the founding of their national institutions. Between 18 December 1958 and 3 August 1960, Niger remained a semi-autonomous Republic within the French Community.

== Commemoration ==
Since 1958, the 18th has been an historic anniversary, widely commemorated, but not a national festival. In 2005, the government of the Fifth Republic of Niger declared the 18th a national holiday, in conjunction with the 3 August Independence Day.

The 18th is celebrated in Niger with official festivals and appearances of political leaders, as well as public parties and festivities. It is a public holiday, in which government offices and many businesses close. The 50th anniversary celebrations were held in 2008, centered not in the capitol, but in the regional center of Tillabéry, and surrounded by sports, musical and arts competitions, the construction and opening of new buildings, a National Youth Festival, and other public festivities. Since the beginning of this national festival in 2006, the official commemorations have always taken place at Regional capitals. Zinder was chosen for 2006 (the 48th anniversary) and again in 2018, Tahoua for 2007 and again 2017, Agadez for 2016, Maradi for 2015, Dosso for 2014, etc. The National Youth Festival, previously held at other dates, has been tied to the new Holiday.

== See also ==
- History of Niger
