= Concord Day =

National holiday in Niger

National Day of Concorde Journée nationale de la Concorde Fête nationale de la Concorde
- Observed by: Niger
- Type: National
- Celebrations: Festivals, Political addresses, Educational and Cultural exchanges
- Date: 24 April
- Next time: 24 April 2026
- Frequency: annual

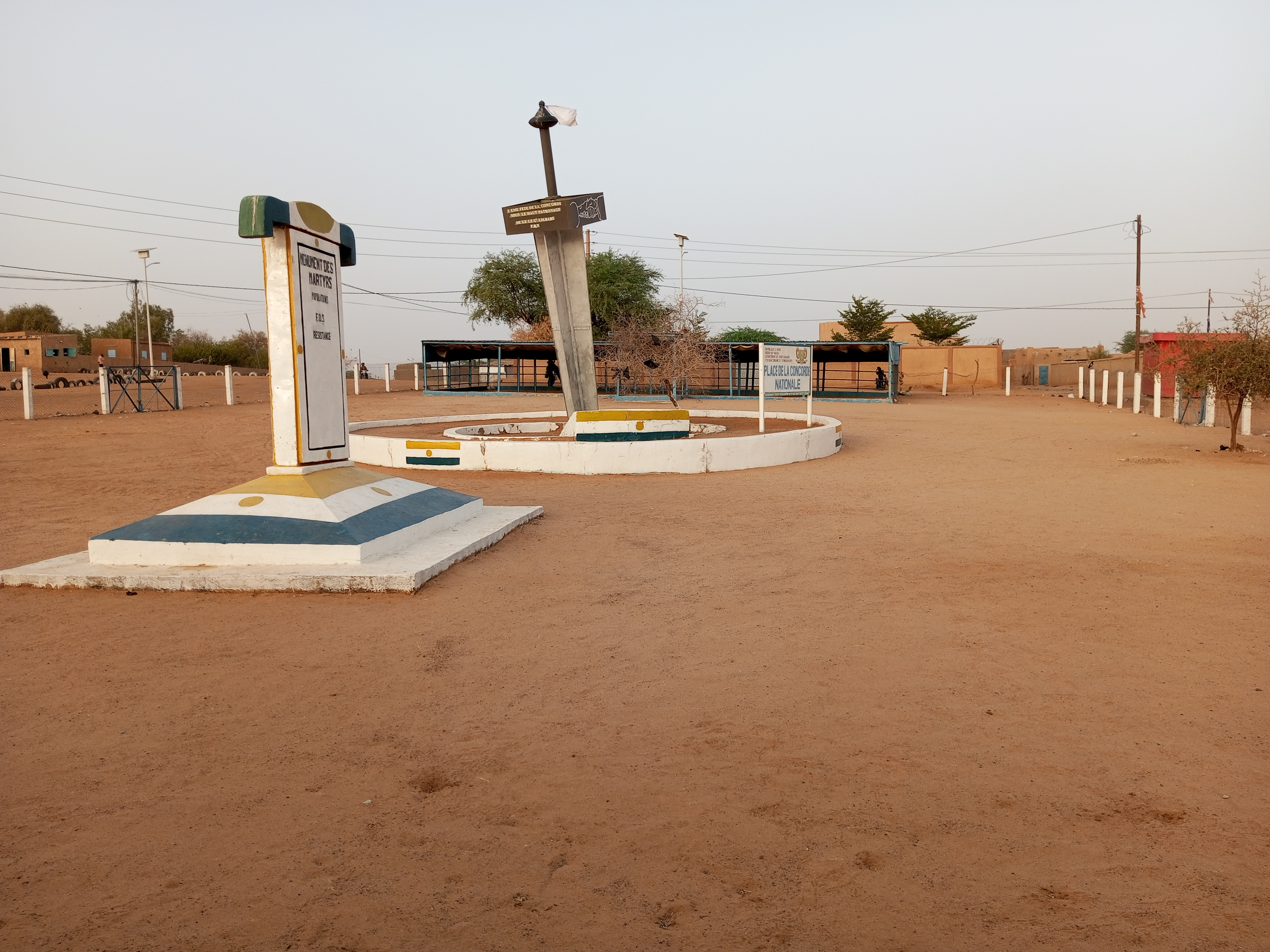
A peace pact was signed in Ouagadougou, Burkina Faso, and initialed in Niamey by the representative of the government of Niger and the leader of the Organization of Armed Resistance (ORA) on 24 April 1995. In 1997, on the occasion of the Tchintabaraden festival, a monument was erected to mark the end of hostilities and the definitive and lasting establishment of peace.

National Day of Concorde (French: Journée nationale de la Concorde, Fête nationale de la Concorde) is a national holiday in Niger, celebrated every 24 April since 1995.

== History ==
Concord Day marks the anniversary of the signing of the 24 April 1995 Peace Accord between the Government of Niger and the Organisation of Armed Resistance (Organization de Resistance Armee, ORA) at the Congressional Palace in Niamey (Palais des Congrès de à Niamey). While this accord was signed only by some armed groups and sporadic fighting continued until 1999, it marked the beginning of the end of the 1990 rebellion in the north and east of the country carried out by elements of Tuareg, Toubou, and other communities. The final peace agreement was celebrated with a "Flame of Peace" in which weapons were burned in Agadez on 25 September 2000, a date that is also commemorated each year in some communities.

== Celebrations ==
The Concorde Festival also celebrates the 2009 agreement to end a renewed Tuareg based insurgency, as well as cross cultural tolerance, peace, and social justice, in this diverse nation.

Niger's National Day of Concorde is celebrated with street parties and educational and cultural events; speeches by the President of Niger and other leaders; and events designed to instill in youth love of nation and cross-cultural peace. The National Day of Concorde is a Public Holiday in Niger, in which businesses and government offices close.

== See also ==
- Tuareg Rebellion (1990–1995)
- Tuareg Rebellion (2007–2009)
- Public holidays in Niger
