= Abdourahamane Tiani =

President of Niger since 2025

General Abdourahamane Tiani
- Tiani in 2024

11th President of Niger
- Incumbent
- Assumed office 26 March 2025
- Prime Minister: Ali Lamine Zeine
- Preceded by: Mohamed Bazoum (2023)

President of the National Council for the Safeguard of the Homeland
- Incumbent
- Assumed office 28 July 2023
- Prime Minister: Ali Lamine Zeine
- Vice President: Salifou Modi
- Preceded by: Collective leadership

Leader of Niger
- De facto 26 July 2023 – 28 July 2023
- President: Collective leadership
- Preceded by: Mohamed Bazoum (as President)
- Succeeded by: Himself (as President of the National Council for the Safeguard of the Homeland)

Commander of the Presidential Guards
- In office 8 April 2011 – 8 August 2023
- President: Mahamadou Issoufou; Mohamed Bazoum
- Succeeded by: Habibou Assoumane

Personal details
- Born: Abdourahamane Tiani; 1 January 1964 (age 62) Toukounous, Filingué, Niger

Military service
- Allegiance: Niger; National Council for the Safeguard of the Homeland
- Branch/service: Niger Army
- Years of service: 1984–present
- Rank: General
- Battles/wars: Boko Haram insurgency Jihadist insurgency in Niger; 2021 Nigerien coup attempt 2023 Nigerien coup d'état 2023–2024 Nigerien crisis

Abdourahamane Tiani (Note: Hausa: [áb.dú.ɽà.há.mà.nè t͡ʃáː.nì]; (Note: In Hausa phonology, alveolar consonants like /t/ undergo palatalization before front vowels like /i/, shifting /t/ to [tʃ].) often incorrectly spelled Tchiani) (born 1 January 1964) is a Nigerien military officer and politician who has served as the 11th president of Niger since 2025. Known for his anti-imperialist, pan-Africanist and Hausa nationalist views, Tiani served as the chief of the Nigerien presidential guard from 2011 to 2023 when he overthrew president Mohamed Bazoum in a coup, becoming the leader of a junta. He was inaugurated as president of Niger two years later.

Born in Toukounous to a Hausa family, Tiani received military training from the National School of Active Officers in Thiès, Senegal. He led Nigerien military forces in Agadez, Diffa and Zinder regions to combat drug trafficking. He later served in United Nations peacekeeping missions in the Ivory Coast, Sudan, and DR Congo. In 2011, Tiani was assigned the command of the Nigerien presidential guard and became a close ally of President Mahamadou Issoufou; however, relations soured after Tiani was accused of conspiring against Issoufou and unsuccessfully attempted a coup in 2021. Issoufou's successor Mohamed Bazoum retained Tiani in his position. In early 2023, Tiani gained knowledge of Bazoum's attempt to dismiss him as head of the presidential guard. This led to Tiani overthrowing Bazoum in the July 2023 coup.

Tiani subsequently became de facto ruler of Niger and declared himself president of the National Council for the Safeguard of the Homeland. He oversaw a diplomatic standoff with ECOWAS stemming from the coup and consequently withdrew from ECOWAS. He formed the Alliance of Sahel States along with Burkina Faso and Mali in July 2024. Tiani has also aligned Niger with Russia, receiving help from Wagner Group forces to fight an insurgency in western Niger. In January 2025, Tiani led Niger to become the first African country and fifth worldwide to eradicate onchocerciasis. He inaugurated himself as the president of Niger in March 2025. In August 2026, mutinous soldiers staged a coup attempt against Tiani in Niamey.

Identified as a Hausa nationalist, Tiani has retained popularity domestically as an anti-imperialist, pan-Africanist and a combatant to French influence in Africa. His rule has nevertheless been regarded as authoritarian and dictatorial.

== Early life ==
Abdourahamane Tiani was born on 1 January 1964. Born into a Hausa family, he hails from Toukounous in the Tillabéri Region, a main recruitment area for the Nigerien army in the west of the country. His father was General Elhadji Tiani Hassane, who passed away in 2026 at the age of 110.

Tiani attended primary school in his hometown of Toukounous, attending the Collège d'Enseignement Général (CEG) in Filingué, before completing his secondary education in the capital Niamey, graduating with a Baccalauréat in 1984. He then joined the army and studied at the National School of Active Officers in Thiès, Senegal in the same year.

== Military career ==
Before becoming Commander of the Presidential guard, he led forces in Zinder, Agadez, and Diffa regions where he combated drug trafficking, and received infantry training at in Montpellier, France, Benguerir, Morocco and in Koulikoro, Mali. He also received training at the College of International Security Affairs (CISA) in Washington, DC.

In 1989, he was the first officer to make it to the site of the UTA Flight 772 crash in the Ténéré desert, for which he was decorated. He also served in UN peacekeeping missions in the Ivory Coast, Sudan, and the Democratic Republic of Congo. He also served in the Multinational Joint Task Force set up by Niger, Chad, Nigeria and Cameroon to fight Boko Haram.

In 2011, Tiani assumed command of the Presidential Guard and was a close ally of then-president Mahamadou Issoufou, who promoted him to brigadier general in 2018. In 2015, Tiani was accused of involvement in a coup plot against Issoufou but denied the charges in court. He was otherwise regarded as keeping his views to himself during that time.

In 2021, Tiani led the unit that thwarted an attempted coup; at the time a military unit tried to seize the presidential palace two days before Issoufou stepped down to make way for his democratically elected successor, Mohamed Bazoum, who retained Tiani in his post.

== Presidency (2023–present) ==
=== Seizure of power ===
On 26 July 2023, Tiani ordered presidential guards to detain Bazoum at his presidential residence in Niamey. Bazoum was planning to relieve Tiani from his position. Sources close to Bazoum said that he had decided on Tiani's dismissal at a cabinet meeting on 24 July as their relations had reportedly become strained.

On 28 July, Tiani revealed himself as the president of the National Council for the Safeguard of the Homeland, which took power on 26 July, in an address on state television. He said the coup was undertaken to avoid "the gradual and inevitable demise" of the country and said that Bazoum had tried to hide "the harsh reality" of the country, which he called "a pile of dead, displaced, humiliation and frustration". He also criticized the government's security strategy for its purported ineffectiveness.

Tiani was formally sworn in as the de jure president on 26 March 2025, for a five year term, and promoted to the rank of general.

=== Domestic policies ===
==== Social policies ====
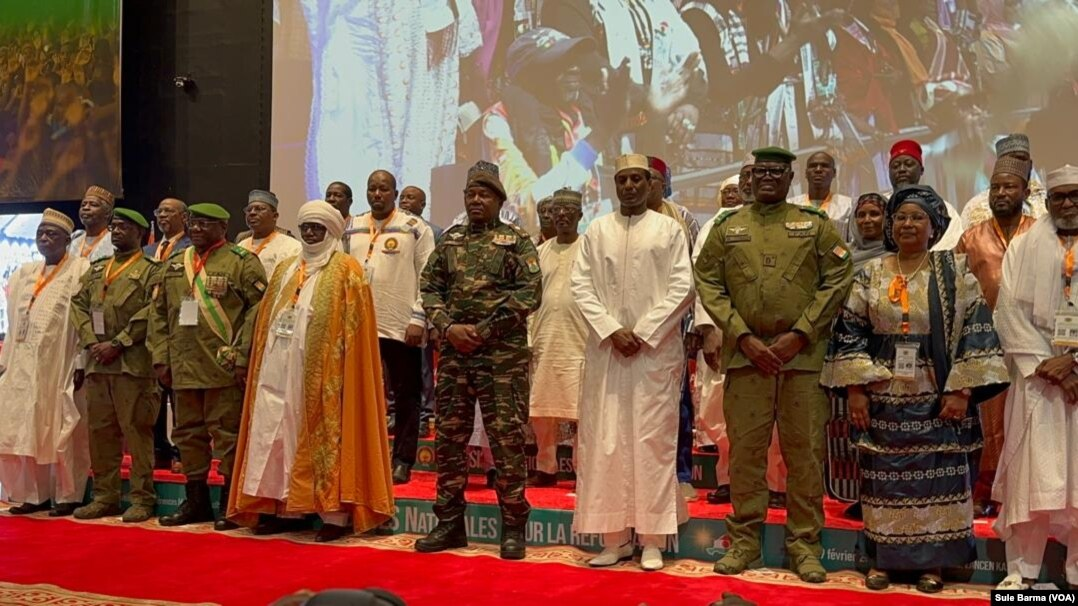
Tiani at the opening ceremony of the National Assembly in 2025

Analysts identified three main objectives of Tiani's internal policy: modernizing the army, promoting economic growth (including a lessened dependence on uranium through investments in agriculture, infrastructure and renewable energy), and implementing an anti-corruption agenda.

Tiani has pursued a socially conservative social policy, with him repealing Law 2015-36 on the Illicit Trafficking of Migrants, which prohibited discrimination (Art. 4) based on a number of personal conditions including sexual orientation. The 2025 transitional charter also penalized homosexuality, with penalites ranging from 10 to 20 years in prison.

Under President Tiani, Hausa replaced French as the national and official language of Niger through the 2025 transitional charter.

==== Economic policy ====
As before the coup d'état, the economic system is based upon planning, but accords an important role to private enterprise. The three main policy objectives are the maintenance of national unity, the elevation of the living standards of the population, and the attainment of economic independence. The private sector of the economy consists partly of a multitude of small enterprises and partly of enterprises belonging to large French or international companies.

In October 2023, sanctions and the suspension of international aid from ECOWAS left Niger as one of the poorest countries in the world. Niger's governing junta announced at the start of the month a 40% cut in the 2023 budget due to "heavy sanctions imposed by international and regional organizations ... exposing the country to a major drop in external and internal revenue." Nigeria, a supplier of 71% of Niger's electricity prior to the coup, contributed to Niamey's crisis by halting its services. By October 2023, Niger's Nigelec state-owned utility company could only meet between a quarter and half of demand across the country.

In February 2024, a new regulatory law was enacted to secure unrestricted access to state resources. Military spending is no longer subject to public procurement regulations. This has paved the way for faster processing of arms purchases, the use of mercenaries, and the alleged personal enrichment of the new rulers.

In June 2024, the military junta revoked the operating licence of French nuclear fuel producer Orano at one of the world's biggest uranium mines. Days later, it announced that the Imouraren mine had returned "to the state's public domain".

His prime minister and finance minister, Ali Lamine Zeine was affiliated with the MNSD-Nassara, a party which advocates for liberal economic policies.

=== Foreign policy ===
==== Relations with ECOWAS ====
ECOWAS, a union of West-African countries, responded to the coup by imposing the strictest travel and economic sanctions the bloc ever imposed on a member state, demanding the reinstatement of Bazoum. As blackouts and supply disruptions roiled Niger, Tiani criticized the sanctions as illegal and inhumane. In a meeting with an ECOWAS delegation, Tiani proposed a three-year window for a transition to civilian rule, which ECOWAS rejected in favor of an immediate transfer of power.

Under Tiani's leadership, Niger established the Alliance of Sahel States with Burkina Faso and Mali in July 2024, and left ECOWAS with them in 2024. ECOWAS lifted the sanctions for humanitarian reasons after Niger had departed the organization.

==== Relations with Russia ====
Under Tiani's leadership, Niger aligned itself closer to Russia and mercenary troops from the Wagner Group were sent to help Niger combat the Jihadist insurgents. During the attempted coup against Tiani in 2026, The Nigerien government requested assistance from Russia's Africa Corps.

In an interview with RFI, Sahel expert Yvan Guaichoua said that the Russian intervention was crucial to keeping Tiani's regime in power, saying "I don't think it's an exaggeration to say that the Russians saved the day."

==== Relations with Algeria ====
After the attempted coup against Tiani in 2026, Algeria deployed troops to Niger. Earlier, the Algerian Ministry of Defence said it had sent four fighter jets to Niger following unrest, and in an interview with President Abdelmadjid Tebboune on October 3, he said that his country sent fighter jets to Niger in late August to help thwart the coup attempt.

==== Relations with France ====
In December 2024, Tiani accused France and Nigeria of colluding with rebel groups to destabilize the Nigerien government, as well as accusing Nigeria of sabotaging the oil pipeline to Benin. Nigeria denied these allegations.

=== 2026 coup attempt ===
In August 2026, mutinous soldiers staged a coup attempt against Tiani in Niamey. Deputy leader Salifou Modi later announced the failure of the coup attempt on Nigerien state television.

== Personal life ==
Tiani is married and has five children. He speaks French, Hausa, Zarma, and English.

=== Public image ===
Domestically, pro-military propaganda and songs have been circulated in his honor. Academic Taiwo Adeagbo asserted that the Hausa people, the majority ethnic group of Niger, were not supportive of Bazoum due to his Ouled Slimane Arab origin and became loyalists of Tiani due to his populist ethnic sentiment.

== Awards and honors ==
=== Domestic ===
- Grand Officer of the National Order of Niger (2021)
- Commander of the National Order of Niger (2018)
- Officer of the National Order of Niger (2010)
- Knight of the National Order of Niger (2004)
- Officer of the Merit of Niger (2001)

=== Foreign ===
- Grand Cross of the National Order of Mali (Mali, 2025)

== Notes ==
Political offices
Preceded by Mohamed Bazoum	President of Niger; 2025–present	Incumbent
