= Independence Day (Niger) =

National holiday in Niger

Independence Day Fête de l'Indépendance du Niger Fête tournante du 3 août
- Observed by: Niger
- Type: National
- Celebrations: Festivals, Political addresses, Parades, Tree planting.
- Date: 3 August
- Next time: 3 August 2025
- Frequency: annual

Independence Day in the Republic of Niger is commemorated on 3 August, marking the nation's independence from France in 1960. Since 1975, it is also Arbor Day, as trees are planted across the nation to aid the fight against desertification.

== Importance of date ==
The date of the formal, complete independence from France was 3 August 1960, while 18 December 1958 marks the founding of the Republic and creation of the Presidency of the Republic of Niger, following the constitutional changes of the French Fifth Republic, and the elections of 4 December 1958 held across The French Colonial possessions. Nigeriens consider that date to be the founding of their national institutions. Between 18 December 1958 and 3 August 1960, Niger remained a semi-autonomous Republic within the French Community. At the beginning of 1960 a revision of the French Community allowed membership of independent states, and on 28 July the Nigerien Legislative Assembly became the Nigerien National Assembly: Independence was declared on 3 August 1960.

== Commemoration ==
Since 1960, 3 August has been a national festival. In 1975, the government began celebrating Independence Day, in part, through the coordinated mass planting of trees in order to fight desertification. The celebrations are also known as the Fête de l'Arbre.

Independence Day is celebrated in Niger with official festivals and appearances of political leaders, an official broadcast by the President as well as the tradition (since 1975) that every Nigerien plant a tree. It is a public holiday, in which government offices and many businesses close.

== See also ==
- History of Niger
- Republic Day (Niger): 18 December
