= List of hospitals in Niger =

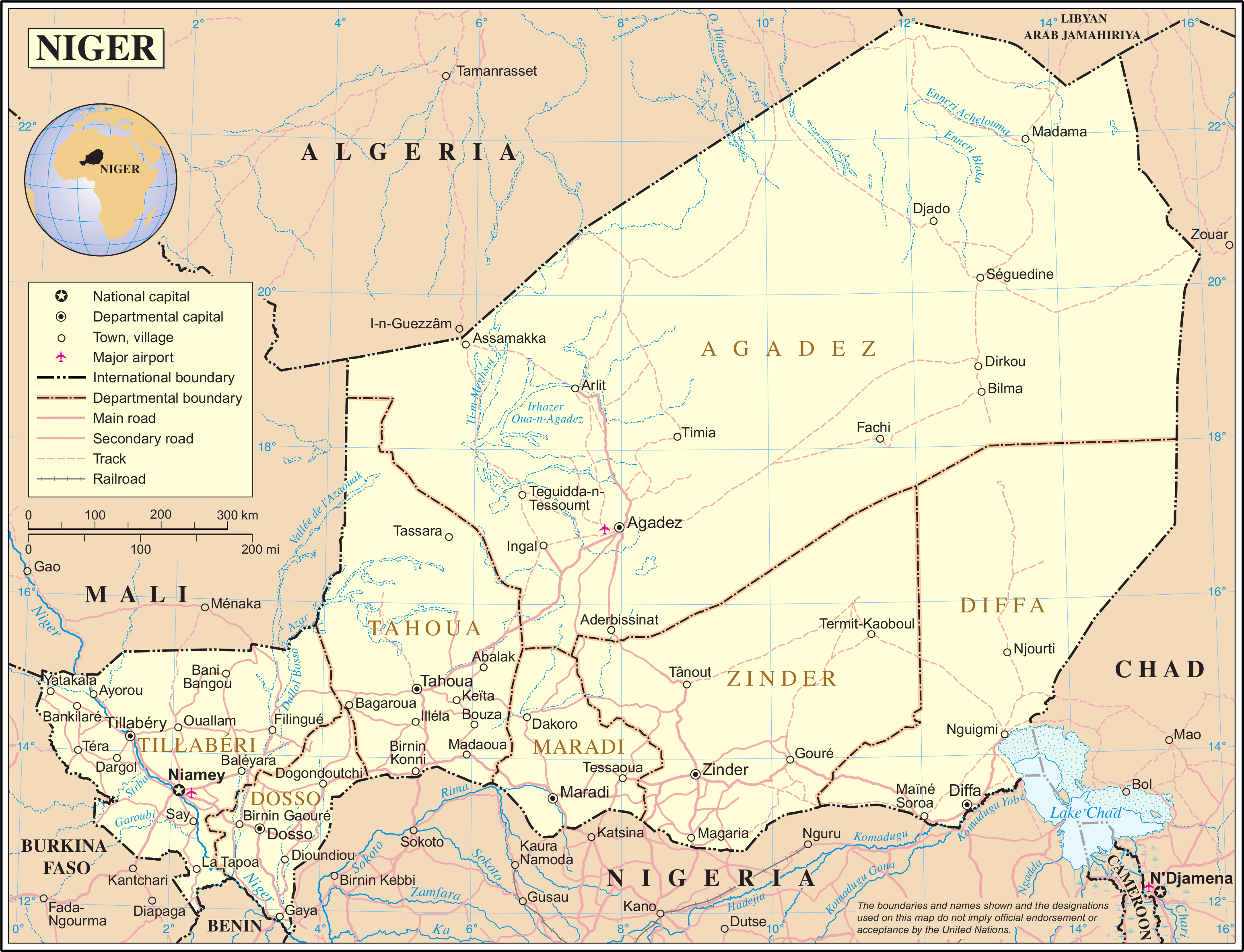

This is a list of hospitals in Niger. While the World Bank classified 40 hospitals in Niger in 2001, most are small clinics. There were on 296 Physicians in a country of over 13 million people in 2004. Some of the larger hospitals are listed below.

== Niamey Capitol District ==
=== Niamey ===
Name	Locale	Opened	Closed
National Hospital	Niamey		
Lamordé National Hospital (Centre Hospitalier et Universitaire – CHU)	Niamey		
La Maternité Issaka Gazoby	Niamey		
Gamkalley Clinic (Private)	Niamey		
General Reference Hospital of Niamey	Niamey	2016	
CURE Hôpital des Enfants au Niger (Charitable)	Niamey	2010	

=== National Hospital of Niamey ===
Created in 1922 by the colonial administration, it received the title of National Hospital of Niamey (Hopital National de Niamey or HNN) in 1962. It is a modern and government operated hospital in the capital of Niger. It is the largest hospital in the country that provides a full range of medical and surgical services to patients in Niamey and the rest of the country. Along with the Lamorde National Hospital, it is the leading hospital in the country. Other regional hospitals refer cases to the National Hospital of Niamey and the Lamorde National Hospital when in need. It is equipped with radiology equipment and provides psychiatry, neurosurgery and cardiology services.

== Maradi Region ==
Name	Locale	Opened	Closed
Galmi Hospital (charitable)	Galmi		
Mayahi District Hospital	Maradi		
Guidan Roumji Hospital	Maradi		

== Dosso Region ==
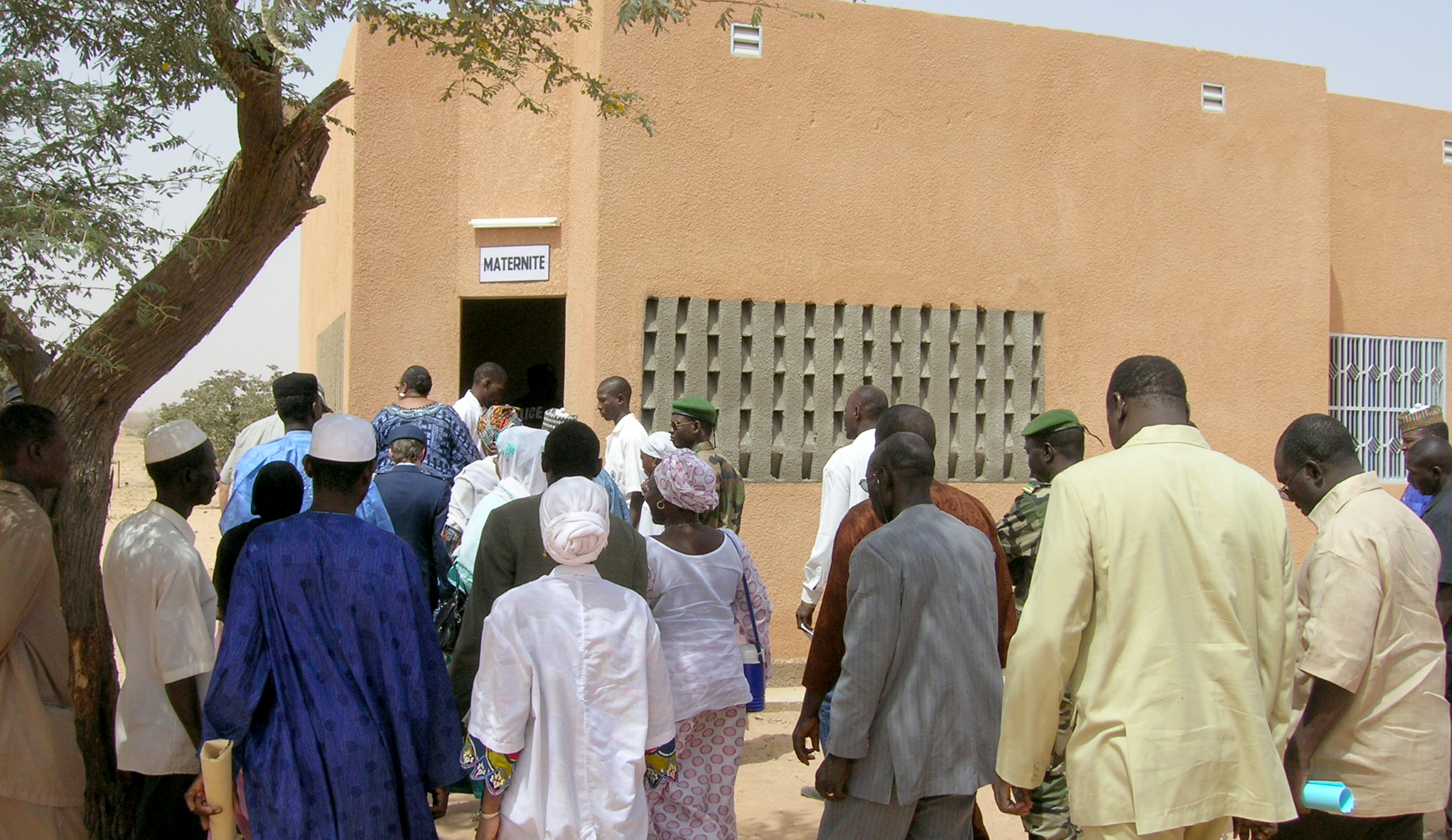
Foreign and Nigerien dignitaries enter the main building of a new health clinic complex, Dosso Regional Hospital, Dosso, Niger. March 2008.

Name	Locale	Opened	Closed
Dosso Regional Hospital	Dosso		

== Tahoua Region ==
Galmi Hospital

== Agadez Region ==
Name	Locale	Opened	Closed
Centre Medical Hospitalier	Agadez		
Cominak Hospital	Arlit		

== Zinder Region ==
Name	Locale	Opened	Closed
Children's Hospital	Zinder		

== See also ==
- Health in Niger
- List of companies based in Niger
