= Bernice King =

American minister and daughter of Martin Luther King Jr.

The Reverend Bernice King
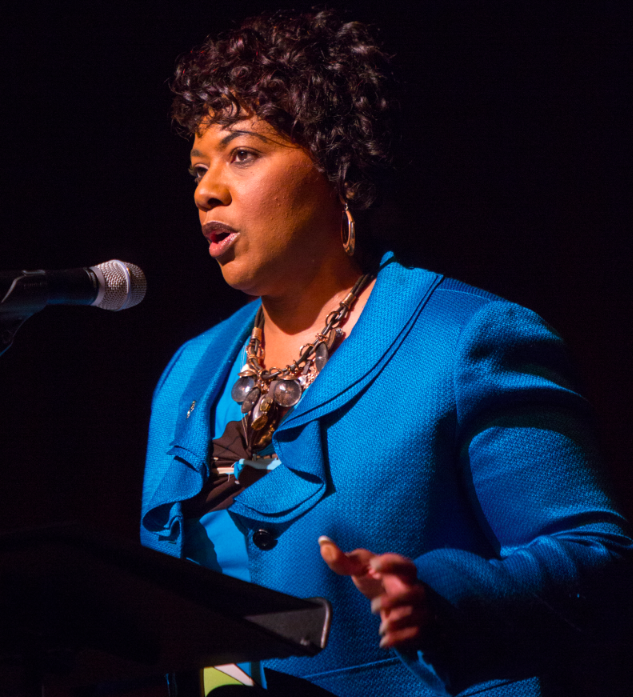
- King in 2014
- Born: Bernice Albertine King; March 28, 1963 (age 63); Atlanta, Georgia, U.S.
- Education: Spelman College (BS); Emory University (MDiv, JD)
- Occupation: CEO of The King Center
- Parent(s): Martin Luther King Jr. Coretta Scott King
- Relatives: Alberta Williams King (grandmother); Martin Luther King Sr. (grandfather); Yolanda Denise King (sister); Martin III (brother); Dexter Scott King (brother); Yolanda Renee King (niece); Alveda King (cousin); Edythe Scott Bagley (aunt); Christine King Farris (aunt)

Bernice Albertine King (born March 28, 1963) is an American lawyer, minister, and the youngest child of civil rights leaders Martin Luther King Jr. and Coretta Scott King. Just one week after her fifth birthday, her father was assassinated. In her adolescence, King chose to work towards becoming a minister after having a breakdown from watching a documentary about her father. King was 17 when she was invited to speak at the United Nations (UN). Twenty years after her father was assassinated, she preached her trial sermon, inspired by her parents' activism.

Her mother had a stroke in 2005, and then died the following year; King delivered the eulogy at her funeral. A turning point in her life, King experienced conflict within her family when her sister Yolanda and brother Dexter supported the sale of the King Center for Nonviolent Social Change. After her sister died in 2007, she delivered the eulogy for her as well. She supported the presidential campaign of Barack Obama in 2008 and called his nomination part of her father's dream.

King is known for her advocacy against gay rights, in contrast to the rest of her outspokenly pro-LGBT family, through the 2000s and early 2010s. She later seemed to retract these views in 2015.

King was elected president of the Southern Christian Leadership Conference in 2009. Her elder brother Martin III and her father had previously held the position. She was the first woman elected to the presidency in the organization's history, amidst the SCLC holding two separate conventions. King became upset with the actions of the SCLC, feeling that the organization was ignoring her suggestions, and declined the presidency in January 2010.

King became CEO of the King Center only months afterward. King's primary focus as CEO of The King Center and in life is to ensure that her father's nonviolent philosophy and methodology (which The King Center calls Nonviolence 365) is integrated in various sectors of society, including education, government, business, media, arts and entertainment and sports. King believes that Nonviolence 365 is the answer to society's problems and promotes it being embraced as a way of life. King is also the CEO of First Kingdom Management, a Christian consulting firm based in Atlanta, Georgia.

== Early life ==
=== Early childhood and tragedies ===
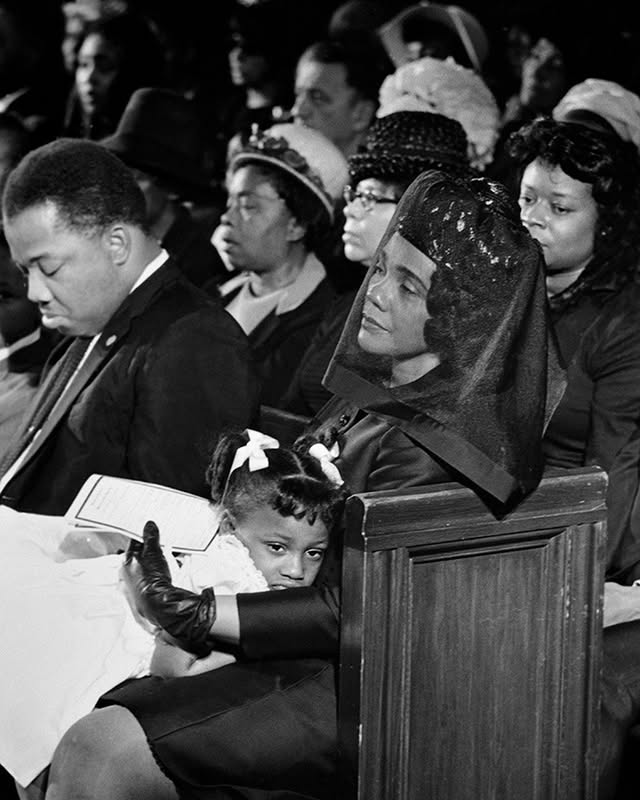
King being comforted by her mother at her father's funeral, in a Pulitzer Prize-winning photograph

Bernice Albertine King was born on March 28, 1963, in Atlanta, Georgia. The day after she was born, her father had to leave for Birmingham, Alabama, but he rushed back when it was time for Bernice and her mother, Coretta, to leave the hospital. He drove them home himself but, in what was all too typical with the work he was doing, had to leave them again within hours. Following her birth, Harry Belafonte realized the toll the Civil Rights Movement was taking on her mother's time and energy and offered to pay for a nurse to help Coretta with the Kings' four children. They accepted and hired a person that would help with the children for the next five or six years. Her father died a week after Bernice's fifth birthday.

Once, she and her sister Yolanda thought it would be funny to pour water into their father's ear while he was sleeping. Their father, though, was furious. It was the first and only time he would ever spank them.

Later on, Coretta told Bernice that her father had celebrated her fifth birthday, knowledge that has been special to her since. King said she has only two strong memories of her father, one of him at home with their family and the other of him lying in the casket at his funeral. "I don't let people know this, but I think of my father constantly," King said at age 19. "Even though I knew him so little, he left me so much." When her father was assassinated in Memphis, Tennessee, Bernice was asleep. When she woke up, her mother told her that the next time she saw her father would be at his funeral. In the April 1998 issue of BET Entertainment Weekly, King reflected, "I was five when my father was assassinated, so I had no concept of who my father really was. I have been told, but imagine trying to really understand or put it in its proper perspective at that age. When it finally became clear to me around fifteen or sixteen, I was angry at him because he left me. So I didn't want to have anything to do with my father."

After her husband's death, Coretta Scott King took on the role of raising four children as a single mother. Family friends recall that she spent considerable time with Bernice, who feels that being raised by a single parent has given her special insight into single-parent homes. "I didn't have a father to deal with about boyfriends. I didn't have a father to show me how a man and woman relate in a family setting. Therefore I have given over my life to mentoring young people. I'm adamant about young people who have been denied a father/daughter relationship."

Other tragedies followed. King's uncle, Alfred Daniel Williams King, drowned in a swimming pool when Bernice was six on July 21, 1969. Five years later, a mentally ill man shot her grandmother Alberta Williams King to death during a service at the Ebenezer Baptist Church on June 30, 1974. King recalled of her grandmother's death, "I remember that day because I had recovered from having my tonsils removed, and I was really looking forward to getting back to Ebenezer, which was pastored by my grandfather on my dad's side of the family." Just two years later in 1976, her 20-year-old cousin Darlene King died of a heart attack. Her grandfather Martin Luther King Sr. also died of a heart attack on November 11, 1984. Also, her other cousin Alfred King the second in 1986.

Finding strength through these childhood tragedies, King jokingly said, required "A lot of prayer. Some crying. Some screaming." Through all of her struggles, she has looked for someone to relate to in "moments" because "nobody fits the bill." Her sister, Yolanda, nearly eight years older, lived through parts of the Civil Rights Movement that she never did. On the other hand, she has written that she believes her brothers have had a life significantly different from hers because "Guys process things differently."

=== Call to ministry ===
King has said that the death of her grandmother and uncle caused her to have anger issues since she was 16 years old. At that age, she saw Montgomery to Memphis, a documentary film on her father's life from the time of the Montgomery bus boycott of 1955 to his assassination in 1968, and "went through almost two hours of crying" and questioning. She had seen the film many times growing up, but the particular viewing "triggered an emotional explosion that later would thrust her into the arms of a loving God." King reflected: "When I saw the funeral scene, I just broke down. I ran out of the cabin into the woods, and for nearly 2-1/2 hours, I just cried." She credited the viewing with influencing her to become a minister like her father, who served as a minister at Ebenezer Baptist Church.

She was with her church youth group in Georgia mountains. The group's youth pastor Timothy McDonald brought the tape of the documentary and comforted her when she started crying. According to McDonald, he explained to her that it was good that she let out how she felt and called coming to terms with her father's death "a stepping stone upon which you will build the rest of your life". King aspired to become the first female President of the United States at the time of seeing the documentary. She attended Douglass High School in Atlanta. Her brother Dexter Scott King attended the school as well and graduated when she was a sophomore. At 17, she was invited to speak at the United Nations in the absence of her mother. According to King, she also received a call to ministry that year.

== Adult life ==
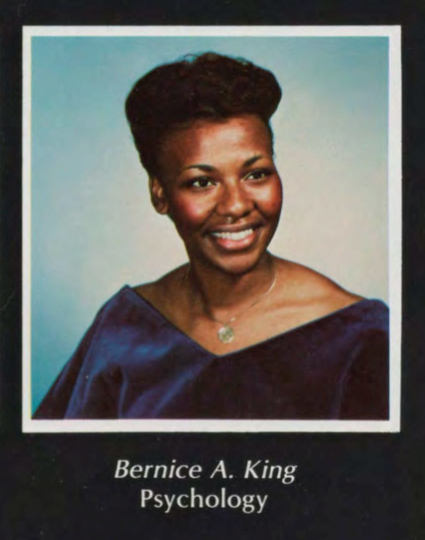
King in the Spelman College yearbook, 1985

At the age of 19, she made her first major speech in Chicago and stated that "We've come a long way. But we have a long way to go." In early 1983, King gave a speech at St. Sabina Church in Chicago. Many members of the audience said that she reminded them of her father. King attended Grinnell College in Iowa, and graduated from Spelman College, a historically black college in Atlanta, with a degree in psychology in 1985. King says she had thoughts of suicide before "God intervened."

King was arrested with her mother Coretta and her brother Martin Luther King III on June 26, 1985, with the offense of demonstrating in front of an embassy. They were participating in anti-apartheid demonstration in front of the South African Embassy. The three stayed in jail overnight. The youngest daughter of Martin Luther King, his widow and his eldest son were charged with a misdemeanor, demonstrating within 500 feet of an embassy. On January 7, 1986, King was arrested with her sister Yolanda and her brother Martin Luther King III for "disorderly conduct." Bernice and her siblings were arrested by officers deployed to the Winn Dixie supermarket. The supermarket had been subject to protest since September 1985, which was when the Southern Christian Leadership Conference began boycotts of South African canned fruit. It was the first time Bernice and her siblings had been arrested together at a protest. On January 15, 1987, what would have been her father's 58th birthday, King spoke in Chicago and told denizens to stay away from drugs.

At the age of 24, Bernice decided to become a minister, and she earned a Master of Divinity (MDiv) and a Juris Doctor from Emory University in 1990. However, King is an inactive member of the State Bar of Georgia.

=== Ministry ===
On May 14, 1990, King became the second woman to be ordained at Ebenezer Baptist Church. She said that it was "the most humbling moment for me in my life." King insisted that she was "not worthy of this high calling. No blood, no sweat, no tears could earn me this high calling." On January 18, 1992, President George H. W. Bush visited the Martin Luther King, Jr. Center for Nonviolent Social Change. King spoke during his visit of the problems of racism, poverty and violence remained in America since her father was alive but did not directly align with any of the issues with President Bush.

In January 1994, King voiced her opposition to New Hampshire's refusal to recognize Martin Luther King, Jr. Day, calling the decision "racist and separatist." On May 21, 1994, she attended the African-American Women's Conference where she said that parents should not let their children listen to "gangster rap" because of messages in the lyrics. In 1996, King published a collection of her sermons and speeches called Hard Questions, Heart Answers. In 2000, she narrated a performance of Aaron Copland's Lincoln Portrait at the Schleswig-Holstein Musik Festival in Kiel, Schleswig-Holstein, Germany. In January of that year, King joined Fred Shuttlesworth in headlining a two-week campus celebration of her father's life at Stanford University.

She was an elder at New Birth Missionary Baptist Church but resigned in May 2011. King joined the church in 2002 and came to regard Bishop Eddie Long as her mentor and spiritual father. The church was the setting for her mother's funeral. Despite her leaving of the church coinciding with Bishop Eddie Long's settlement agreement in sexual misconduct lawsuits he had fought since September 2010, King said that she had planned to leave New Birth Missionary Baptist Church for weeks. "It has nothing to do with anything that's going on with Bishop Long," King said on May 25, 2011. "I always knew I would not be at New Birth forever. This is the time for me to leave." On May 25, 2011, King told an interviewer that her last time serving as a member of the church was the past Sunday. She has said her decision to leave was because of her desire to continue the legacy of her parents, which had grown stronger since the death of her mother. At the time that she chose to leave the church, she planned on starting her own ministry.

King said her mother heard Obama's speech at the 2004 Democratic National Convention and contacted her the following day over the senator's address, expressing her belief in Obama's political future. In June 2006, King told a teenage audience that she intended to do more to carry on the legacy of nonviolence espoused by her parents during the 20th annual 100 Black Men of America conference in Atlanta. "My desire is not to be a hypocrite," King said. "I want to make sure my life is not a contradiction when I take a platform." On January 30, 2007, one year after the death of her mother Coretta, King founded the Be A King Scholarship at Spelman College, her alma mater, in honor of her mother's legacy. On June 10, 2007, King acted as a presenter at the 2007 Atlanta H.U.F. Awards. Afeni Shakur said she was happy to have King and the other presenters "participating" that year.

On May 4, 2013, a rose was planted for King's mother, Coretta, at the Alabama Capitol. Bernice said that while her mother loved roses, she did not have much time to tend to them because she was continuing her husband Martin Luther King, Jr.'s legacy.

On April 29, 2014, King and her brother Martin Luther King III joined Governor of Georgia Nathan Deal while he signed legislation to provide a statue of their father. "We all know that monuments and statues are that, they're things we put in place for people to remember and it's not always for our generation," Bernice King said. "It's really about the next generation." On May 31, 2014, King accepted a $50,000 grant from Microsoft during the opening of its store at Perimeter Mall in Atlanta. Also in attendance to the ceremony were Mary Carol Alexander, Georgia Department of Labor Commissioner Mark Butler and Representative Tom Taylor. On June 24, 2014, King's parents were posthumously awarded the Congressional Gold Medal. Bernice King stated in a statement released after the award was announced that the King family was "deeply honored" by her parents "being given this award in recognition of their tireless and sacrificial leadership to advance freedom and justice through nonviolence in our nation". King was the keynote speaker at the Atlantic City Rescue Mission 50th anniversary gala, held on August 14, 2014.

During her college years, King considered a career as a television anchor. In May 1988, King was among the students of Emory charging that the college should hire more African Americans as teachers and teach the works of African American theologians in its courses. She said, "Black students on predominately White campuses have been ignored, humiliated, intimidated...and in many instances, eliminated." She said the students and people in general had excused the "insensitivity" of the administration and faculty "for too long." Bernice served as a student chaplain at the Georgia Retardation Center and Georgia Baptist Hospital as part of the requirements for her theology class and interned at the Atlanta City Attorney's office. She is a member of the Alpha Kappa Alpha sorority, as was her mother.

On March 27, 1988, nearly 20 years after her father's assassination, King delivered her first sermon at Ebenezer Baptist Church. The sermon's theme was "You've Got To Rise Above The Crowd." King said her decision to deliver the sermon as "affirming a call I received at 17." She also said, "At some point in our lives, comes the moment of decision. For me, that moment is now. I submit myself totally to the will of God." Andrew Young, who attended the sermon, compared her style to her father's and noted their similarities while calling listening to her speak "a very emotional occasion for me."

Young also said that King becoming a minister "almost makes you believe preaching is hereditary," after her service. By delivering an "acceptable sermon," King was given her license to preach by Joseph Roberts, pastor of Ebenezer who stated, "We rejoice with God, the angels and the archangels that another warrior, a peaceful warrior, is fighting under the spirit of her father, grandfather and uncle." Veteran members of the church said her style was similar to her father's.

King's mother said at the time that she was satisfied with her daughter's decision to become a minister and stated that they had become closer than ever in the months leading up to the sermon. She also said listening to her daughter delivering a sermon with the same fervor and intensity her father had "was a joyous occasion; a real thanksgiving." Also, in attendance were all three of her elder siblings, Yolanda, Martin Luther King III and Dexter. King's maternal grandparents were reported by her mother to have also been moved by the speech. Her sermon was delivered the day before her twenty-fifth birthday.

=== King Center ===
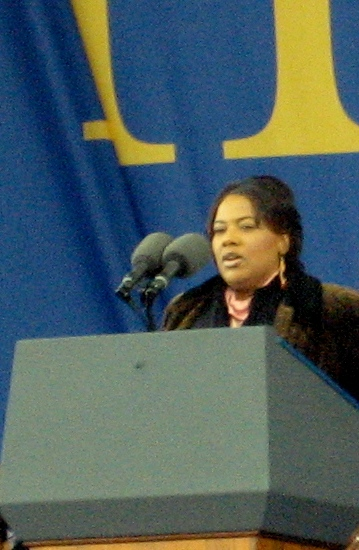
King in 2006

In 2008, King and her brother, Martin Luther King III, filed suit over the alleged mismanagement of funds from the King Center against their brother Dexter Scott King, who then filed a countersuit against them. Dexter King articulated his distress over Bernice's conservative religious views as departing from their father's legacy. In October 2009 the lawsuits were settled out of court.

In January 2012, King was named CEO of the King Center. On May 19, 2012, King met with Aïssata Issoufou Mahamadou, First Lady of Niger and wife of Mahamadou Issoufou. Mahamadou's visit to the King Center was a priority during her trip to the United States, having been an ardent admirer of King's father and mother. King accepted a plaque bearing crucifix symbols from Mahamadou.

On September 26, 2013, Evelyn G. Lowery died at her home. The King Center released a statement from Bernice King in response to her death, with her saying "I am deeply saddened by the death of Mrs. Evelyn Gibson Lowery, and my heart goes out to her husband, Dr. Joseph E. Lowery and their three daughters, Yvonne Kennedy, Karen Lowery and Cheryl Lowery-Osborne. We are never prepared to say 'goodbye' to a loved one." While attending a naturalization ceremony for an estimated 100 immigrants on November 16, 2013, with Vice President Joe Biden, King criticized the use of the terms "illegal aliens" and "illegals".

On March 28, 2014, in honor of King's 51st birthday, the King Center hosted a girl and women's empowerment event. The organization held a special screening of the documentary "Girls Rising." King herself said the experience was "designed to educate, empower and inspire young women to confront and overcome the obstacles they face in their struggles to fulfill their dreams and impact the global community."

On August 13, 2014, King addressed the shooting death of Michael Brown and demonstrators reacting in response. She called on demonstrators to channel their responses into constructive nonviolent action and mentioned witnesses giving conflicting accounts of the shooting. On August 19, King expressed her belief that the community of Ferguson, Missouri was crying out for help after years of neglect. It was reported that a small delegation from the King Center would travel to Ferguson and planned to meet with "every element" of the community. The following day, August 20, King released a statement on Michael Brown's death, sympathizing with his parents. On August 26, King addressed students at the Riverview Gardens High School. King told the students her father's legacy was "on the line" and if "this doesn't turn out the right way, it could begin to have people question what happened years ago."

=== Public speaking ===
King was the keynote speaker at the Seminole County Prayer Breakfast in February 1998. Geoff Koach, spokesman for Strang Communications, said prior to the breakfast that there was an expectation to see "a lot more people of color there" and another reason for her being chosen to speak was to quell racial tensions in the county. He added: "We felt she could help unify citizens, the various organizations, government and church officials." In June 2006, five months after her mother's death, King made it known to a number of teenagers during the panel discussion at the 20th annual 100 Black Men of America conference in Atlanta that she intended to continue the legacy of nonviolence that had been attributed to her parents. That same year, King and her brother Martin Luther King III expressed interest in creating a civil rights museum near Ebenezer Baptist Church and the King Center, where both of their parents are buried.

On January 20, 2009, she joined her brother Martin Luther King III on CNN's The Situation Room to discuss the inauguration of the 44th President of the United States, Barack Obama.

On April 17, 2009, King delivered an address at Liberty University. LU Chancellor Jerry Falwell, Jr. said that the university had been looking forward to King speaking all year. He said King helped "to bridge the divide that was created between different groups of students during the 2008 election season. For example, she gave a strong Gospel message today. African American Christians and white Christians have been separated into different political camps in the last generation or so, but they share many of the same core values, especially when it comes to social issues like abortion, marriage and school vouchers." King said the university was a place for "kings-in-training." She told Liberty University students they were "very blessed and highly favored to be at an institution such as this." She called for students to accept "your identity. You're a king. Don't ever see yourself as a subject."

On July 7, 2009, King spoke alongside her brother Martin at the Staples Center in Los Angeles at a ceremony commemorating the life of Michael Jackson.

On October 16, 2011, King mentioned at the Martin Luther King, Jr. Memorial opening that the memorial had been in the making for a lengthy amount of time and a "priority" for her mother. She and her brother Martin supported Occupy Wall Street protests. On January 13, 2012, King was the keynote speaker at the 24th Annual Dr. Martin Luther King Jr. Awards Dinner. On March 29, 2012, a month after the shooting death of teenager Trayvon Martin, King released a statement through the King Center. In her remarks, she referred back to the deaths of her father and paternal grandmother, who like Trayvon Martin, were killed by firearms. She concluded her statement by saying we "are still on the journey to the Mountaintop. Join me on the journey as we pray for Trayvon's family, the community of Sanford and all who are in danger of being victims of violence."

She made a public statement with regard to the State of Florida v. George Zimmerman verdict on July 15, 2013, via a CNN appearance with Wolf Blitzer. She clarified a tweet she had posted on Twitter, and explained that the handling of the verdict would "determine how much progress we've made". She spoke at a town hall meeting dedicated to Trayvon Martin and has admitted to having been "heartbroken" by the verdict. She said Trayvon Martin's death and Zimmerman's acquittal were a wake-up call for Americans.

On August 28, 2013, the fiftieth anniversary of the March on Washington, in which her father took part, King spoke and related that the denizens of the United States were "still bound by a cycle of civil unrest and inherit social biases, in our nation and the world, that oftentimes degenerates into violence and destruction". Despite this, she admitted to being pleased to see many young people and women at the event, noting that was not the case during the March on Washington itself. King alluded to the death of teenager Trayvon Martin in February 2012 and said "If freedom stops ringing, then the sound will disappear and the atmosphere will be charged with something else. Fifty years later, we come once again to this special landing on the steps of the Lincoln Memorial to reflect, to renew and to rejuvenate for the continued struggle of freedom and justice."

She spoke at the Boys & Girls Clubs of Northeast Florida fundraiser on October 29, 2013, where she encouraged involvement in the lives of children. King addressed the death of Nelson Mandela on December 5, 2013. On January 20, 2014, the year's Martin Luther King, Jr. Day, King spoke at Ebenezer Baptist Church. King said there was "much work that we must do" and asked if we are "afraid, or are we truly committed to the work that must be done?"

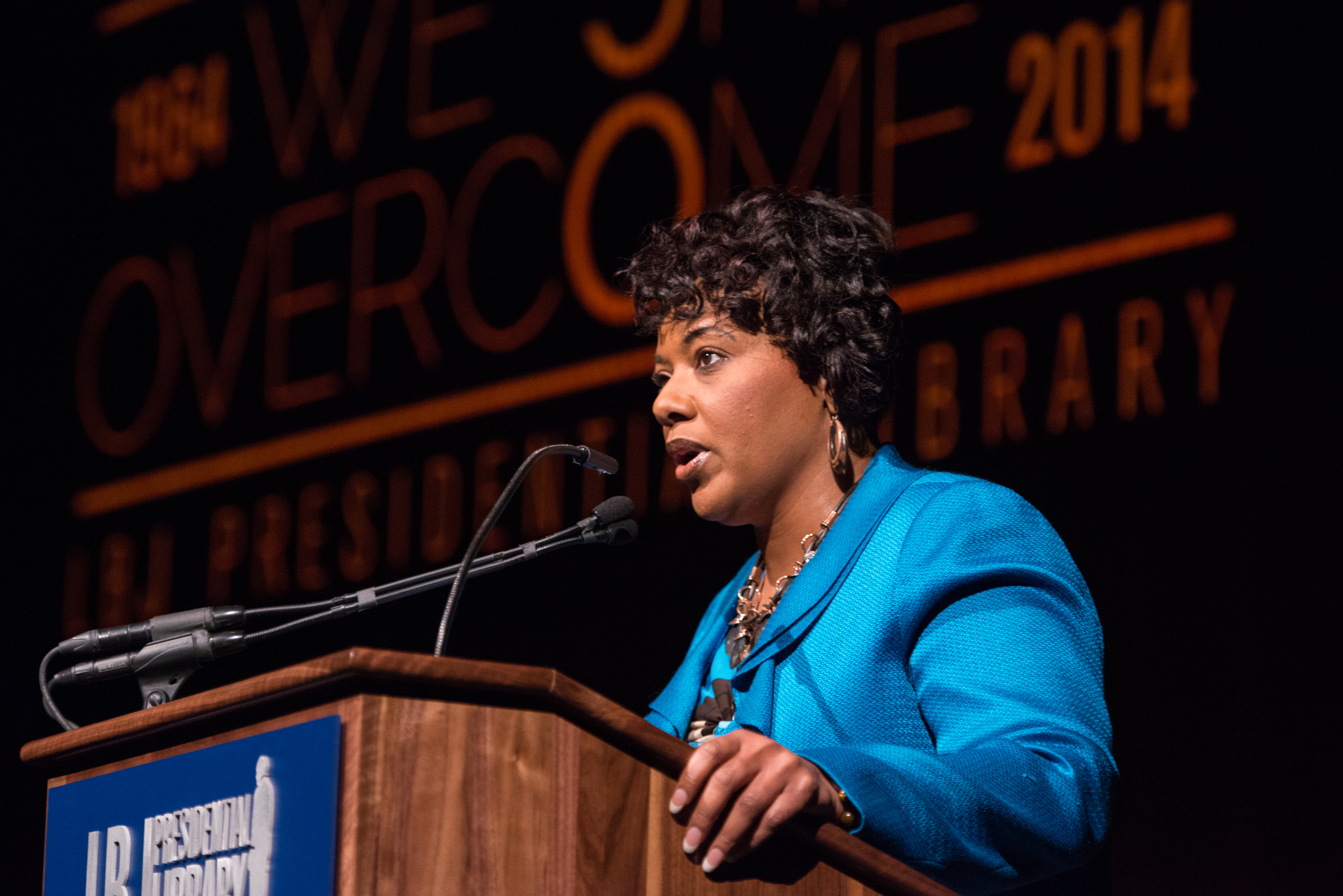
King in April 2014 speaking at the Lyndon Baines Johnson Library and Museum.

On March 19, 2014, King gave a speech at Seminole State College of Florida as part of the school's Speaker Series. It focused on the 50th anniversary of the March on Washington and the Civil Rights Act of 1964. After her address, King was presented with a key to the city by Sanford Vice Mayor Velma Williams. King spoke at Fontbonne University on September 17, 2014. She was joined by members of the King Center staff, who aided her in urging the community to not act out with violence.

=== March against same-sex marriage ===
On December 11, 2004, King participated in a march against same-sex marriage in Atlanta. This action was in contrast to the advocacy of her mother, Coretta, and her older sister Yolanda, both longtime, outspoken supporters of gay rights. She was joined by senior pastor at New Birth Missionary Baptist Church Eddie Long, who said in a written statement that the march was not "to protest same-sex marriage, but to present a unified version of righteousness and justice." At the time of the march, King said she had become a "spiritual daughter" of Eddie Long and the issue of same-sex marriage legalization had left many divided. "The question is, how do you overcome that pain?" she said. "It may be the wedge that stays with us for a long time. We have to get to a place where it does not become the most defining issue of our time."

She incorporated the King Center and the eternal flame at her father's tomb into the march. The King Center denied her permission to begin the march at her father's tomb and accused her of doing so to "provide support for her own personal cause" and "to enhance her personal standing in New Birth." The event was also criticized by gay rights organizations, which stated it betrayed the legacy of her father. Chuck Bowen, a spokesman for Georgia Equality, stated that he was surprised to learn of the march. "I think it's very sad," Bowen said. "I think she's abusing the good name of Dr. King and the work he did creating equality for all Americans."

=== Deaths of mother and sister and King Center sale ===
King's mother, Coretta Scott King, had a stroke in August 2005. She died on January 30, 2006. King delivered the eulogy at her funeral. King called her mother's death a "major turning point." She felt that her mother's death was a "rebirth" for her, "in terms of understanding that I come from roots of greatness and I am called to greatness and there's nothing I can do but try to be my best self." On October 24, 2005, Rosa Parks died of natural causes. Her funeral took place on November 2, 2005. Bernice King attended the funeral and delivered remarks on behalf of her mother. Bernice was the only one of the four King children to be with Coretta Scott King when she died and learned that her mother's remains could not be transported back to Georgia, since Mexican authorities required an autopsy first.

In the months between their mother's stroke and death, Bernice and her brother Martin Luther King III vowed to fight the sale of the King Center to the National Park Service. The siblings were put against their brother Dexter and sister Yolanda, who supported and voted in favor of the sale in early December 2005. On December 30, 2005, King and her brother Martin stated that their priority was to preserve their "father's legacy and their mother's dream." Bernice stated of her mother's opinion on the sale that "She felt at some point that it may, in fact, end up with the government, but she never envisioned that in her lifetime." Andrew Young said transferring power would allow the family to focus more on Martin Luther King's message of nonviolence and less on maintaining the grounds. Bernice King said government ownership, which would befall the King Center if it were sold to the National Park Service, would result in "a loss of ideological independence." Martin Luther King III stated that Bernice had been removed as secretary and that he had been replaced as chairman by their brother Dexter.

Sixteen months later, on May 15, 2007, King's sister Yolanda King died after collapsing and was unable to be revived. King delivered the eulogy at her sister's memorial on May 24, 2007. During Yolanda King's eulogy, King admitted that her death was even more difficult than her mother's and said her sister often addressed her as her "one and only sister." She added, "It's very difficult standing here blessed as her one and only sister. Yolanda, from your one and only, I thank you for being a sister and for being a friend." She joined her brothers in lighting candles in their sister's memory.

=== Southern Christian Leadership Conference ===
With her brother Martin Luther King III, she has played an active part in reforming the Southern Christian Leadership Conference (SCLC) once led by her father. When she was elected president and CEO of SCLC on October 30, 2009, a position previously held by both her father and brother, she became the first woman to lead the group, but discord in the organization has prevented her taking that position. King's election was won by a 23-to-15 vote, allowing her to defeat Arkansas judge, Wendell Griffen. Specialists said King would need to move beyond her family history when she took the position the following year. Andra Gillespie, a professor at Emory University, said King could hark back to her father's legacy, but that she was going to have to "redefine" it. Gillespie also stated that King would have to "figure out a way to push that legacy forward so we don't perpetuate a stagnant, chauvinistic civil rights agenda."

Despite her excitement being "high", King noticed the SCLC's board of directors had started "ignoring" suggestions she made to "revitalize" the organization. King said that she had made suggestions to the SCLC about how the presidency might operate in October 2010, but was not contacted formally until January, three months later. She stated that she felt "disrespect" by the three months in between her suggestions to the organization and their response. Despite this, she said that she would continue to "pray for them to move in a positive direction". On October 1, 2010, she led a prayer to an audience of around 200 people that had come to pray for healing and reconciliation of the Southern Christian Leadership Conference. Through prayer, King said, they would "seek to destroy the work of the enemy." King called the SCLC preparing to hold two separate conventions "an unfortunate turn of events." In January 2011, three months after making the plea, she declined to be SCLC's president. While in Birmingham, Alabama on August 11, 2014, for the national convention of the Southern Christian Leadership Conference, King endorsed having the 2016 Democratic National Convention be held in Birmingham, reasoning the "golden anniversary of civil rights events throughout the south and Birmingham in particular offers added significance" to it being held there.

== Legal issues ==
King and her brother Martin Luther King III accused their brother Dexter of having disengaged them from decisions and shareholder meetings. They alleged that their brother had done this since 2004. On October 12, 2009, the dispute was settled out of court. The King siblings spent the entire day of October 12 locked away. The purpose of the lockdown was for the three to settle on a deal. Following the completing of their meeting, Bernice and her brother Martin said outside the Fulton County Courthouse that the results of the settlement seemed positive.

=== Book deal ===
Bernice King and Martin also opposed the giving up of photographs, personal letters and papers of their mother to a biographer. Their brother Dexter asked a judge to force them to comply. The biographer, Ms. Reynolds, met Coretta Scott King in 1972 and said that the widow had asked for her to write a follow-up to her 1969 memoir. King and her brother's lawyer stated that their mother had changed her mind about the biography citing Mrs. King's apparent disapproval of Reynolds's writing style. A judge ordered the Kings to appear in court on October 14, 2008. David J. Garrow, biographer of King's father, said that it was "sad and pathetic to see the three of them behaving in this self-destructive way."

By September 2009, the book deal was defunct and a judge ordered the three siblings to have a meeting. On September 14, King and her brother Martin sat through court motions, testimony and proceedings for more than 13 hours. In a separate hearing, Dexter Scott King's attorney Lin Wood argued that Bernice King willingly ignored a court order. He reasoned this because Bernice did not reveal the contents of the safe deposit box.

Wood also said King's brother Martin and one of Bernice's lawyers, who was no longer on the case, was aware of the letters and refused to reveal them. Bernice's attorney Charles Mathis said she "did not conceal anything" and said "She thought she was doing what she was supposed to do when she told her first lawyer. There was not an intentional failure to disclose."

The next day, Dexter Scott King's lawyers contended that Bernice was legally compelled to turn the letters over to Dexter but ignored the order. Dexter's attorney Wood said, "Regardless of what your last name is, if you have willfully withheld then you must suffer the consequences." Wood noted that Bernice denied the existence of the safety deposit box several times while under oath, which she said she found after the death of her sister Yolanda, who once owned it.

=== Mishandling of memorabilia ===
On August 28, 2013, the fiftieth anniversary of the March on Washington, the King estate filed a lawsuit against the King Center alleging that it had been careless with its handling of Martin Luther King, Jr. memorabilia. The lawsuit also claimed that attempts to resolve the issue with King Center CEO Bernice King have failed and that there had been a "total breakdown in communication and transparency." The King estate sent a 30-day notice to the Center on August 10, 2013. It notified the center that the licensing agreement for the King memorabilia was being terminated and that the center could avoid this by placing Bernice King on administrative leave and pulling Andrew Young and Alveda King from the board. According to the estate, Alveda King tried to "impede" the audit. The estate sought a court order barring the center from using the memorabilia after the license expired.

=== Belafonte documents ===
Harry Belafonte filed a lawsuit in October 2013, where he asked to be declared the owner of three documents given to him by the Kings and for their daughter Bernice King to be barred permanently from trying to claim ownership. The documents are Martin Luther King, Jr.'s "Casualties of the War in Vietnam", which Belafonte stated he had been in possession of since 1967, the undelivered "Memphis Speech" found in Martin Luther King's pocket after his assassination and a letter of condolence sent by President Lyndon B. Johnson to the then-newly widowed Coretta Scott King. The King estate and Bernice King disputed Belafonte's ownership of the documents when in 2008, he took the items to Sotheby's auction house in New York to be appraised and put up for sale. On April 11, 2014, Belafonte and the King estate said in a joint statement that a confidential compromise "resulted in Mr. Belafonte retaining possession of the documents."

=== Bible and Nobel Peace Prize family dispute ===
In 2014, King's brothers Martin Luther King III and Dexter Scott King filed a lawsuit against her to have her relinquish their father's Nobel Peace Prize and his Bible, which was later used by Barack Obama during his second presidential inauguration in 2013, to the King estate so that they could sell the items. In the lawsuit, her brothers complained that she had "secreted and sequestered" the two items of interest in violation of a 1995 agreement that gives the brothers sole control of all of their father's property. King said in her defense, "I take this strong position for my father because Daddy is not here to say himself my Bible and medals are never to be sold."

Martin Luther King III was reported to have sent her, on January 20, 2014, the year's Martin Luther King, Jr. Day, a letter requesting a meeting to "discuss and vote on whether to offer for purchase at a private sale the Nobel Peace Prize and the King Bible." On January 22, 2014, Dexter Scott and Martin Luther King III voted as board members of the King estate to pursue the sale of their father's award and Bible. The items had been in Bernice's care since the death of their mother, Coretta Scott King, in 2006. Bernice's position had support by members of the civil rights community, including C. T. Vivian, Andrew Young, and Joseph Lowery. King's cousin, Alveda King, was also supportive of Bernice. She said, "I am standing with her because I do believe we can't have a sale to the highest bidder with those family heirlooms."

On February 4, 2014, Bernice King stated that she would protest the sale of her father's Bible and Nobel Peace Prize and as a result, oppose her brothers. She said profiting from the Nobel Peace Prize's sale would be "spiritually violent" and "outright morally reprehensible." On February 6, 2014, King asked in a press conference in Ebenezer Baptist Church for the media to "refrain from grouping me with my brothers." On February 19, 2014, a judge ordered her to give up the items, and had them kept temporarily in a safe deposit box under the name of the King estate. The judge will remain in possession of the key until the matter is settled.

The judge compared King's stance against the sale of her father's Bible and Nobel Peace Prize to Coca-Cola not wanting to sell its recipe, and later noted that he was not trying to trivialize the value of Martin Luther King, Jr.'s possessions by making the comparison. While King said that people had urged her to retain the Bible and Nobel Peace Prize and go to prison instead, she complied with the judge's order. On March 6, 2014, she asked her brothers to hold another vote and said she hoped one of them would change his mind. Despite facing an estrangement from her brothers, she hoped that she would be able to reconcile with them on the matter and said she is open to an out-of-court settlement. She appealed to anyone who would consider purchasing the bible and Nobel Peace Prize should they be put on sale to take the moral high road by leaving the "sacred in its sacred state." While she was given a deadline of turning them over by March 3, it was extended another five days, according to one of Bernice's lawyers.

King said that she would never support her brothers in selling the Nobel Peace Prize and Bible. She said that if her father was alive, he would say, "my Bible and my medal are never to be sold, not to an institution or even a person." On March 10, 2014, King turned over the Nobel Peace Prize and Bible to Martin Luther King III for placement in a safety deposit box in a meeting that lasted five minutes. A lawyer involved in the dispute said few words were exchanged while Bernice surrendered the items. Eric Barnum, an attorney of Bernice King, said that his client "complied with the court order."

On March 14, 2014, Ron Gaither, one of Bernice King's lawyers, argued that William Hill, lawyer of Martin Luther King III and Dexter King, should not have any role in the case because of his involvement in the 2008 dispute between the King children. A judge appointed Hill as Special Master in 2008. Lawyers of Bernice King in a court hearing said that "Hill played a vital and substantial role in adjudicating a multitude of disputes that arose between the parties." The lawyers argued that this gave Hill an advantage while putting Bernice at a disadvantage. Hill's defense of himself was that he only had access to documents related to Coretta Scott King's estate and that Bernice King's lawyers were using a stalling tactic by trying to disqualify him. Fulton County Superior Court Judge Robert McBurney stated that he would soon issue a ruling on whether Hill would be disqualified.

McBurney granted Bernice King's lawyers' request and disqualified Hill. The case was scheduled to go to court in 2015, but McBurney halted the case to give both sides the opportunity to come to an agreement out of court. In August 2016, the siblings settled out of court and the case was dismissed, with Martin Luther King III, chairman of the King estate, taking possession of the Bible and Nobel Peace Prize. Former president Jimmy Carter helped mediate the agreement.

== Honors and awards ==
On December 14, 2007, at the State Bar of Georgia Headquarters, King was honored by the Georgia Alliance of African American Attorneys with the "Commitment to Community" award for her work as an attorney and community leader.

On October 7, 2009, King received an award for her "lifetime of service to women and other causes" at the National Coalition of 100 Black Women Convention.

On November 7, 2013, as part of the "Celebrating the Dream", in commemoration of the 50th anniversary of the I Have a Dream speech done by her father, King received the Legend Award as a tribute to his legacy and after she delivered a speech.

Ebony magazine named her one of their Ten of Tomorrow future leaders of the black community.

== Anti-LGBT rights advocacy ==
In 2005, she led a march to her father's gravesite and at the same time called for a constitutional ban on gay marriage. She once said to LGBT supporters that her father did not take a bullet for same-sex marriage.

During Atlanta's 2012 Martin Luther King Jr. Day rally, King included LGBT people among the various groups who needed to come together to "fulfill her father's legacy." When speaking at Brown University in 2013, King made statements regarding her beliefs about the origins of marriage: "I believe that the family was created and ordained first and foremost by God, that he instituted the marriage, and that's a law that he instituted and not... that we instituted" and about the origins of same-sex attraction: "I also don't believe everybody's born that way. I know some people have been violated. I know some people have unfortunately delved into it as an experiment". King has publicly stated that her father would have been against gay marriage. Her statement was in contradiction of her mother, Coretta Scott King, who was an avid supporter of the LGBT community and publicly stated her husband would have been also.

=== Retraction ===
However, by 2015, it appeared she had changed her stance on the matter, as she issued a press release as CEO of the King Center supporting the United States Supreme Court's ruling on Obergefell v. Hodges legalizing gay marriage.
