= Hadiza Bazoum =

First Lady of Niger from 2021 to 2023

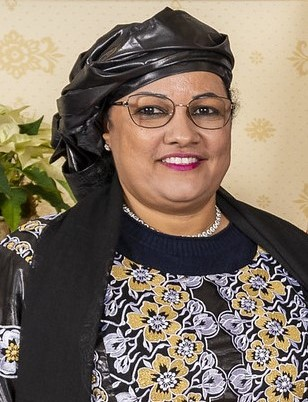
- Bazoum in December 2022

First Lady of Niger
- In office 2 April 2021 – 26 July 2023
- President: Mohamed Bazoum
- Preceded by: Aïssata Issoufou; Lalla Malika Issoufou
- Succeeded by: ?

Personal details
- Born: 1968
- Party: PNDS-Tarayya
- Spouse: Mohamed Bazoum
- Children: Four
- Education: University of Niamey

Hadiza Ben Mabrouk Bazoum (born 1968) is a Nigerien lawyer and women's rights advocate. She served as the First Lady of Niger from April 2021 until July 2023 during the presidency of her husband, Mohamed Bazoum.

Since the July 2023 Nigerien coup d'état, which overthrew President Bazoum's democratically elected government, former First Lady Hadiza Bazoum and her husband have been held under house arrest in the Presidential Palace in Niamey by the military junta. Nigerien and international human rights organizations have called for the couple's release, along with the release of other political prisoners. In February 2025, a United Nations working group called for the immediate release of Hadiza and Mohamed Bazoum, decrying their detention as "arbitrary" and in violation of international law.

== Biography ==
Hadiza Bazoum was born in Niger in 1968. She is a member of the Toubou people, an ethnic group from northeastern Niger.

Bazoum trained as a lawyer. She completed her secondary education in Niger and studied at the University of Niamey (now known as Abdou Moumouni University). While attending college, she met her future husband, Mohamed Bazoum, at a political meeting, where he was speaking about education reforms. Mohamed Bazoum worked as a teacher and politician before being elected president in 2021. The couple have four children: three daughters, including Zazia Bazoum and Khadija Bazoum, and one son, Salem Bazoum.

=== First lady of Niger ===
Mohamed Bazoum was elected President of Niger during the 2020–21 Nigerien general election, succeeding outgoing President Mahamadou Issoufou. Bazoum was inaugurated on 2 April 2021, marking the first peaceful democratic transition from one democratically elected president to another since Niger gained independence in 1960.

Hadiza Bazoum became the new First Lady of Niger. During her tenure as first lady, Bazoum focused on improving women's rights in Niger, as well as access to education and healthcare for women. She established and headed the Noor Foundation in 2021 to promote charitable initiatives. Through the Noor Foundation, Bazoum held a regional forum of women leaders to discuss peace and social issues in Tahoua in June 2022. Bazoum and her Noor Foundation supported youth empowerment initiatives, poverty alleviation, school construction in Diffa, aid to flood victims in Zinder Region, and new healthcare facilities. She also promoted the arts and Niger's cultural heritage, including support for Nigerien artists, writers, and musicians domestically and internationally. In December 2022, Bazoum also hosted the 16th Aïr Festival in the oasis town of Iferouane with Minister of Culture, Tourism and Handicrafts Mohamed Hamid, with the aim of improving Niger's attractiveness as a potential tourism and ecotourism destination.

=== 2023 coup d'état and arrest ===
On 26 July 2023, a coup d'état led by Presidential Guard Commander Abdourahamane Tiani, overthrew President Mohamed Bazoum. President Bazoum, First Lady Hadiza Bazoum, and their son, Salem, were arrested and placed under house arrest at the Presidential Palace in Niamey on the day of the coup. Bazoum's daughters were in Paris at the time. Their son, Salem, was released on 8 January 2024 in a deal mediated by Togo and Sierra Leone. It was erroneously reported that Hadiza Bazoum had been released as well, but she remained in detention with her husband.

President Mohamed Bazoum and First Lady Hadiza Bazoum have remained under house arrest in a wing of the presidential palace since the July 2023 coup. They are being held with two servants in rooms with no windows and no access to their lawyers. A physician is reportedly allowed to visit and bring the Bazoums food once a week. In an August 2023 interview with The Guardian, Baozum's daughter, Zazia, reported that her parents were being held without clean water and a limited supply of basic food, such as pasta and rice. She also said that both her parents had lost weight since their arrest.

Human Rights Watch says at least 30 of the presidential couple's political allies are also in prison or house arrest in Niger. Meanwhile, the military junta which ousted Bazoum, the National Council for the Safeguard of the Homeland, led by Tiani, operates from another part of the same presidential palace where Mohammed and Hadiza Bazoum are imprisoned. According to Jeffrey Smith, the executive director of Vanguard Africa, "They're [Mohamed and Hadiza Bazoum] being used as hostages, as human shields, for their captors, who actually rule from the same palace."

Human rights groups and supporters of former President Bazoum have launched a global campaign to pressure the Tiani military junta to release Hadiza Bazoum and her husband, though some worry the couple are being forgotten after the coup. In February 2025, the United Nations Working Group on Arbitrary Detention, an independent expert group, determined that the arrest and detention of former President Bazoum and First Lady Bazoum violated international human rights law and called for their immediate release. Transparency International Niger and the Association for the Fight against Corruption (l'Association nigérienne de lutte contre la corruption, ANLC-TI) also denounced the "prolonged and unjust detentions" of Hadiza Bazoum and her husband on in a statement on 8 April 2025. The organizations called for the release of the former first lady and president, as well as other political prisoners who had been arrested since the July 2023 coup, including former Interior Minister Hamadou Souley, human rights activist Moussa Tchangari, and opposition politician, Intinicar Alhassane. The government of Nigeria also reiterated its call for the release of the former president and first lady in April 2025.
