= Aïssata Issoufou Mahamadou =

Nigerien chemist and chemical engineer

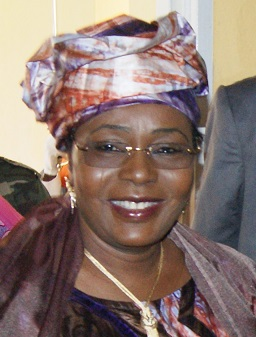

First Lady of Niger
- In role 7 April 2011 – 2 April 2021 Serving with Lalla Malika Issoufou
- President: Mahamadou Issoufou
- Preceded by: Fati Alzouma Djobo Salou
- Succeeded by: Hadiza Bazoum

Personal details
- Born: Mainé-Soroa, Niger
- Party: PNDS-Tarayya
- Spouse: Mahamadou Issoufou
- Education: École nationale supérieure de géologie University of Niamey

Aissata Issoufou Mahamadou is a Nigerien chemist, chemical engineer, mining specialist, and healthcare advocate who served as First Lady of the Republic of Niger from 7 April 2011 to 2 April 2021. She is the first wife of former President Mahamadou Issoufou and shared the title of First Lady with Issoufou's second wife, Lalla Malika Issoufou. Issoufou Mahamadou is president of the Guri-Vie Meilleure Foundation.

== Biography ==
Issoufou was born in Mainé-Soroa, a town in the Diffa Region of Niger. She attended elementary school in Mainé-Soroa and an all girls high school in Niamey.

Aïssata Issoufou Mahamadou was one of the first Nigerien women to pursue a career in the sciences. She received a degree in mineral exploration and development from the École nationale supérieure de géologie (National School of Geology) in Nancy, France. She then earned her master's degree in chemistry from the University of Niamey, which is now known as Abdou Moumouni University. Issoufou Mahamadou headed the mineralogy division of SOMAIR, the national mining company of Niger and a subsidiary of Areva.

Issoufou Mahamadou has described herself as an admirer of American civil rights leaders Martin Luther King Jr. and Coretta Scott King. On May 19, 2012, Aïssata Issoufou Mahamadou visited The King Center in Atlanta and met with its CEO, Bernice King, of part of her trip to the United States, where she was seeking support to alleviate poverty and lack of healthcare in Niger. Issoufou Mahamadou presented King with a plaque containing crucifix symbols crafted by the Tuareg people.

In March 2018, First Lady Aïssata Issoufou and the Ministry of Health partnered with the Merck Foundation, the charitable foundation of the Merck & Co. pharmaceutical company, to increase access to healthcare in Niger. The partnership between Issoufou and Merck, which was announced on International Women's Day, focused on oncology, diabetes, and fertility services and training in Niger. The foundation also named Issoufou Mahamadou as an Ambassador of its "Merck More than a Mother" campaign, which aims to break social stigmas against infertility and childless women.

The First Lady hosted the Miss Intellect Niger awards to mark International Women's Day in March 2019.
