= HIV/AIDS in Niger =

Infection rates of HIV/AIDS in Niger are estimated to be under 1%, low in relation to most of Africa and much of the world.

== Prevalence ==
2007 estimates put the number of HIV positive Nigeriens at 60,000 or 0.8% of total population, with 4,000 deaths in that year. United Nations estimates in 2008 gave similar figures, giving Niger one of the lowest infection rates on the continent.

2008 estimates ranged from 44,000 to 85,000 people living with HIV in a nation of around 14 million, with an adult (aged 15 to 49) prevalence rate of between 0.6% and 1.1%. Adults aged 15 and up living with HIV were estimated to range from 42,000 to 81,000, with women of this age range making up about a third (12,000 to 26,000). Estimates of children (under 14) living with HIV were between 2,500 and 4,200. Total deaths were estimated to be between 3,000 and 5,600 per year. AIDS orphans (under 17) were estimated at between 18,000 and 39,000.

The government of Niger has coordinated educational campaigns around sexual activity and condom use to stem HIV infection. Condom use remains low by international standards.

== Vulnerability to HIV ==
A 2001 study found that vulnerability to HIV infection is potentially high among a study group in the capital, Niamey. Infection via sharing personal objects was the most cited vector of HIV transmission, and that little association amongst respondents was made between HIV and sexual activity. Men were less likely than women to recognize the use of condoms as a preventive measure, or that unprotected sex is a risk factor for infection.

While 97% knew what a condom was, only 31% reported ever used a condom, 51% among those self-identified as sexually active. Of the sexually active in the survey, only 57% reported using a condom during their last sexual contact. 60% of those interviewed reported themselves to be sexually active, and the vast majority reported being in a monogamous relationships and perceived a low HIV risk.

== See also ==
- Health in Niger
