= Lalla Malika Issoufou =

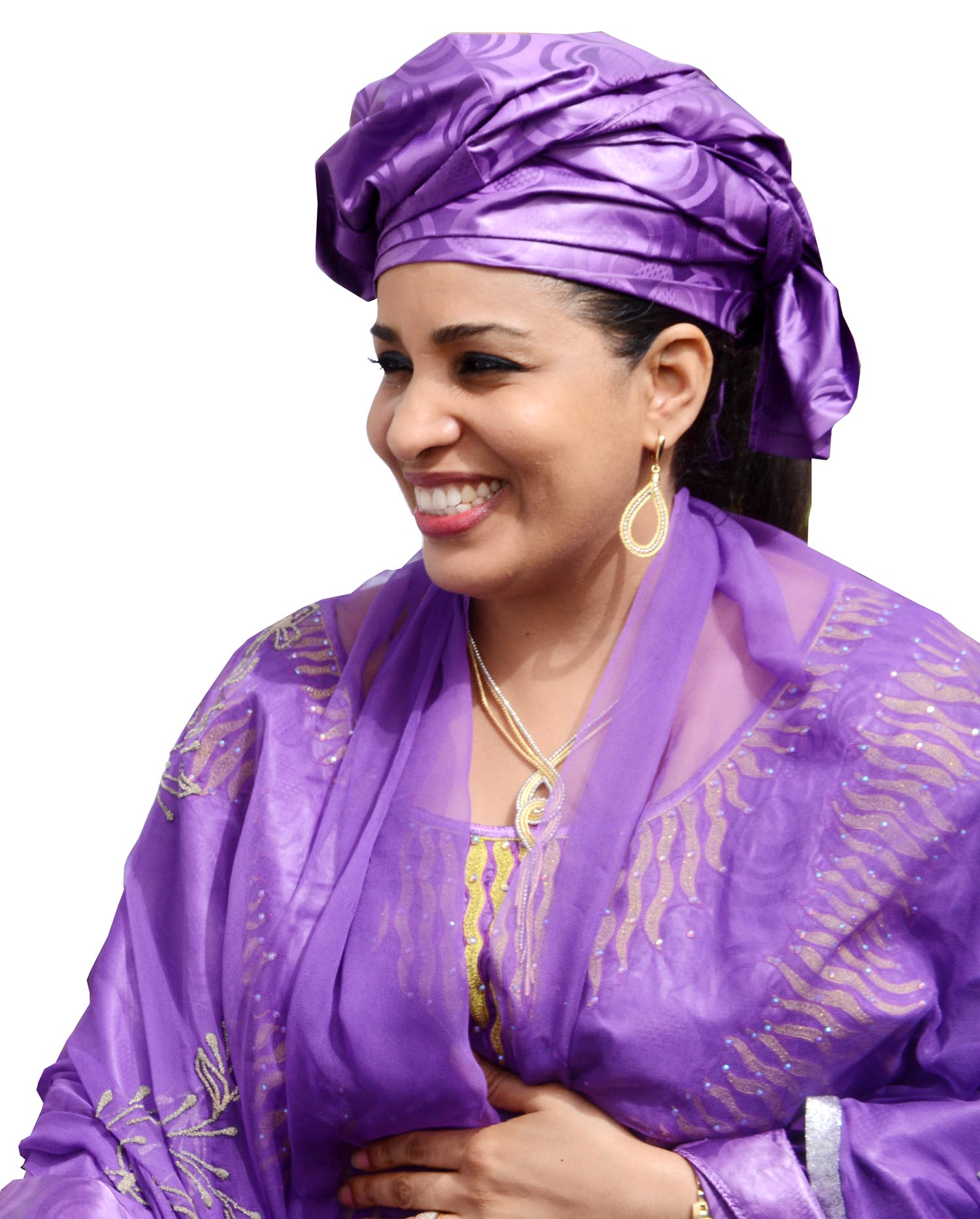

First Lady of Niger
- In role 7 April 2011 – 2 April 2021 Serving with Aïssata Issoufou Mahamadou
- President: Mahamadou Issoufou
- Preceded by: Fati Alzouma Djobo Salou
- Succeeded by: Hadiza Bazoum

Personal details
- Born: 14 February 1975 (age 51) Niamey, Niger
- Spouse: Mahamadou Issoufou
- Children: Three
- Education: Abdou Moumouni University

Lalla Malika Issoufou (born 14 February 1975) is a Nigerien medical doctor and patron of many charities. She served as First Lady of Niger, alongside Aïssata Issoufou Mahamadou, from 7 April 2011 to 2 April 2021 as the second wife of President Mahamadou Issoufou.

== Career ==
Lalla Malika Issoufou was born on 14 February 1975 in Niamey, Niger. She holds a doctorate in medicine from the Abdou Moumouni University and worked at the National Hospital in Niamey from January 2001 to September 2003. Issoufou studied at Paris Diderot University in 2004–05 and was awarded a diploma in the treatment of HIV and other sexually transmitted diseases, she also studied at the Pierre and Marie Curie University in 2005–06 and received a diploma in tropical medicine. In October 2011 she was made president of the Tattali Iyali Foundation, a non-governmental organisation that treats infectious diseases in Niger. She is a patron of more than 27 other Nigerien societies and organisations largely related to health, women's rights, children's rights and education.

Issoufou, via the Tattali Iyali Foundation, regularly presents food to the personnel serving in the Niger Armed Forces and their wives during Ramadan. The foundation aims to improve the conditions of women and children in Niger; to improve the nutrition of pregnant women and children under five (and so reduce infant and maternal mortality) and to fight the illegal sale and counterfeiting of medicines. Issoufou has written on the dangers that obstetric fistulas present to Nigerien women during childbirth.

Issoufou is married to the former Nigerien president Mahamadou Issoufou and they have three children. She shared the position of First Lady of Niger with Issoufou's first wife, Aïssata Issoufou Mahamadou.
