= Health in Niger =

Life expectancy development in Niger

Niger is a landlocked country located in West Africa and has Libya, Chad, Nigeria, Benin, Mali, Burkina Faso, and Algeria as its neighboring countries. Niger was French territory that got its independence in 1960 and its official language is French. Niger has an area of 1.267 million square kilometres, nevertheless, 80% of its land area spreads through the Sahara Desert.

As of September 8, 2021, Niger has a population of 25,308,477. Niger is one of the poorest countries in the world with 2/3 of the population living below the poverty line.

Niger has been facing armed violence over the last three years and this violence has resulted to people's inability to access health services. Thus, the health care system in Niger is one of the lowest ranked countries on the Human Development Index with financial, human-resource and geographical challenges. This violence has worsened these challenges in the provision of healthcare. Public health in Niger suffers from a chronic lack of resources and a small number of health providers relative to population. Some medicines are in short supply or unavailable.

In Niger, development in the areas of health and economics have been lackadaisical and challenging. Niger always ranks at or close to the bottom of the United Nations Development Program's Human Development Index. Food insecurity and infectious diseases in Niger have contributed to some of the apical mortality and malnourished rates globally and also has the highest fertility rate in the world. Increased population growth has threatened to further overpower Niger's healthcare structure and its most susceptible communities.

The Human Rights Measurement Initiative finds that Niger is fulfilling 73.8% of what it should be fulfilling for the right to health based on its level of income. When looking at the right to health with respect to children, Niger achieves 94.8% of what is expected based on its current income. In regards to the right to health amongst the adult population, the country achieves 100.0% of what is expected based on the nation's level of income. Niger falls into the "very bad" category when evaluating the right to reproductive health because the nation is fulfilling only 26.7% of what the nation is expected to achieve based on the resources (income) it has available.

== Health infrastructure ==
Globally, Niger has one of the poorest economies and thus, experiences constant periods of severe droughts that abate its food resources. This has negatively impacted on the health of the population. Furthermore, Niger's history of political uncertainty and corruption have added to the country's poor standard of social, health, and welfare conditions.

There are government hospitals in Niamey (with three main hospitals in Niamey, including the National Hospital of Niamey and the Hôpital National De Lamordé), Maradi, Tahoua, Zinder and other large cities, with smaller medical clinics in most towns. In 2015, Niamey has the highest number of doctors in Niger accounting for about 598 doctors, that is, 63.35% and the districts Zinder, Maradi, Tahoua, and Tillabéri has an estimate of 89.51% of doctors. Therefore, a total number of 944 doctors were estimated in 2015.

Medical facilities are limited in both supplies and staff, with a small government healthcare system supplemented by private, charitable, religious, and Non-government organisation operated clinics and public health programs (such as Galmi Hospital near Birnin Konni and Maradi).

Government hospitals, as well as public health programmes, fall under the control of the Nigerien Ministry of Public Health, Population and Social Affairs. A number of private for profit clinics ("Cabinets Médical Privé") operate in Niamey and other cities. The total expenditure on health per capita in 2005 was Intl $25. In 2003, 89.2 percent of individual expenditures on healthcare were "out-of-pocket" (paid by the patient).

== Health indicators ==
=== Fertility rate ===
In Niger, the total fertility rate is 7.0 live births per woman. The figure below shows the trends of fertility rate from 1990 to 2100 in Niger, Western Sub-Saharan Africa, and globally. This comparison shows that Niger is far behind the global rate.

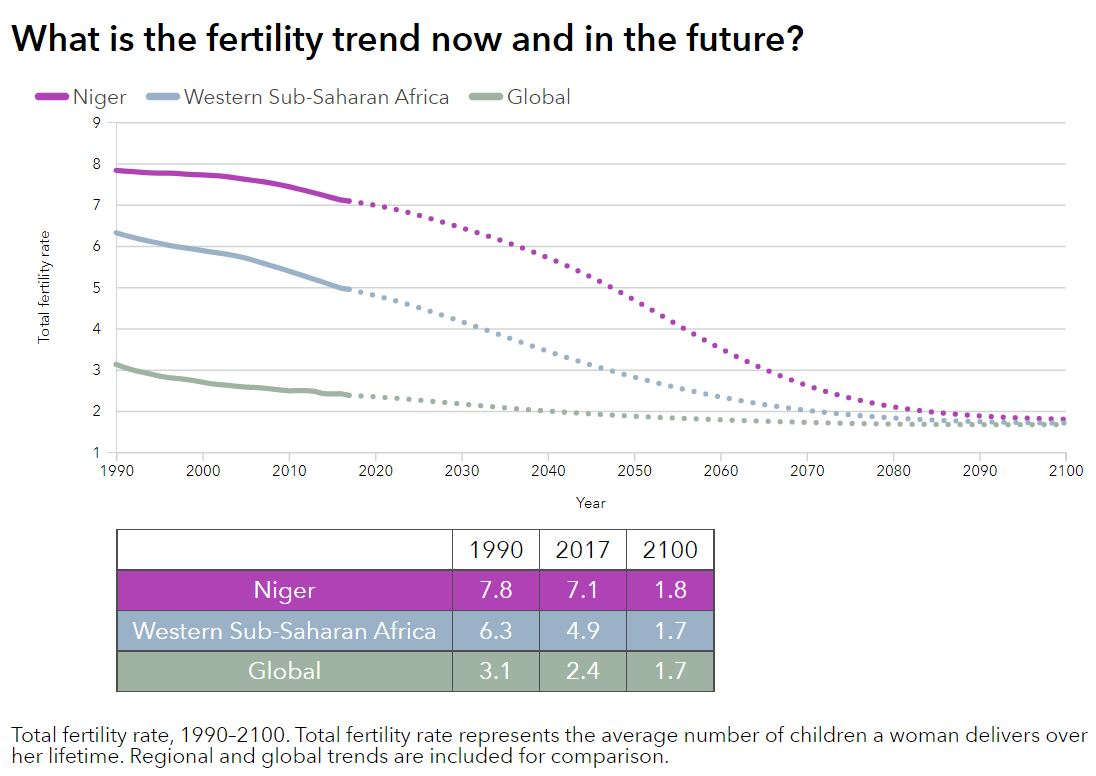

=== Maternal mortality ratio ===
In Niger, the maternal mortality ratio is 509 deaths per 100,000 live births. Meanwhile, there was a reduction of 38%, that is, from 342 to 211 deaths per 100,000 live births in the global maternal mortality from 2000 to 2017. This transcribes into an average decline rate of 2.9% annually. While this is significant, it is below half the 6.4% annual rate required to attain the global sustainable development goal of 70 maternal deaths per 100,000 live births. Sub-Saharan Africa and South Asia are the two regions that constitute for 86% of maternal deaths globally. Sub-Saharan Africans especially have the highest maternal mortality ratio, that is, 533 maternal deaths per 100,000 live births, or 200,000 maternal deaths annually. This is more than 68% (2/3) of all maternal deaths per year globally. The South Asian region has a maternal mortality ratio of 163, or 57,000 maternal deaths annually constituting to 19% of the total deaths worldwide.

=== Neonatal mortality rate ===
In 2019, neonatal mortality rate for Niger was 24.3 deaths per 1,000 live births which fell gradually from 59.4 deaths per 1,000 live births in 1970 to 24.3 deaths per 1,000 live births in 2019.

=== Infant mortality rate ===
In 2019, infant mortality rate for Niger was 46.7 deaths per 1,000 live births. Infant mortality rate of Niger fell gradually from 131.8 deaths per 1,000 live births in 1970 to 46.7 deaths per 1,000 live births in 2019.

=== Under-five mortality rate ===
In 2019, child mortality rate for Niger was 80.4 deaths per 1,000 live births. Child mortality rate of Niger fell gradually from 325.7 deaths per 1,000 live births in 1970 to 80.4 deaths per 1,000 live births in 2019.

=== Current health expenditure as a share of GDP ===
In 2018, health expenditure as a share of GDP for Niger was 7.3%. Though Niger health expenditure as a share of GDP fluctuated substantially in recent years, it tended to decrease through 2004 – 2018 period ending at 7.3%

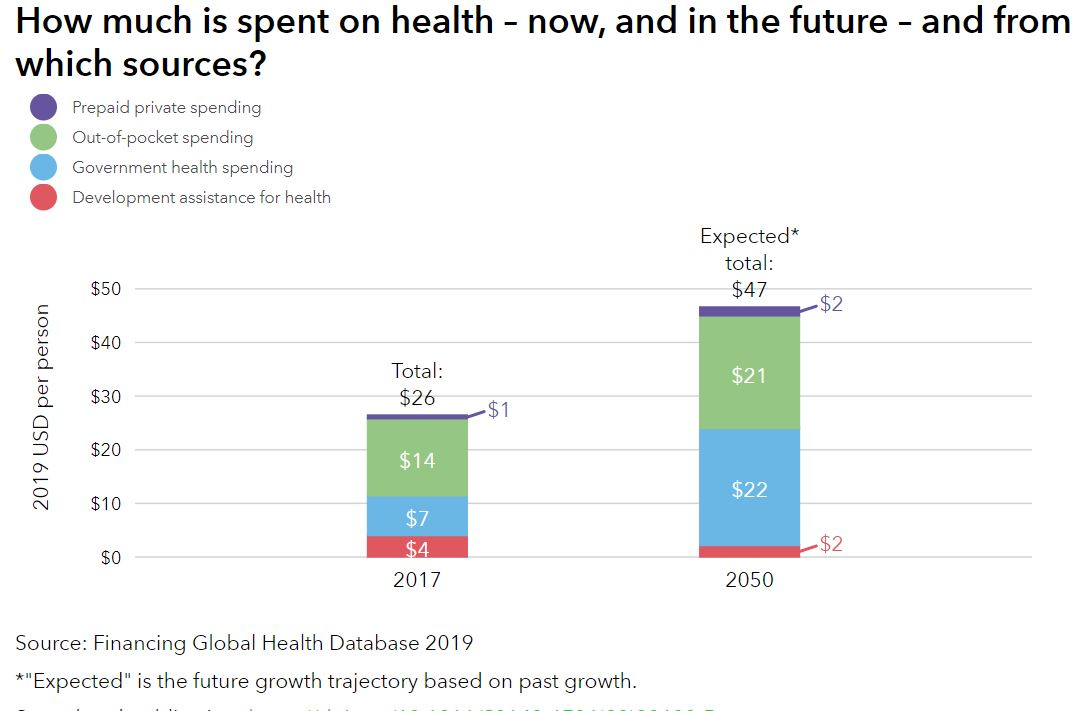

=== Current health expenditure per capita ===
In 2018, health expenditure per capita for Niger was 30 US dollars. Though Niger health expenditure per capita fluctuated substantially in recent years, it tended to increase through 2004 – 2018 period ending at 30 US dollars in 2018. The diagram shows the present and future expenditure on health and the sources from which it is spent from.

=== Life expectancy ===
Life expectancy in Niger is shown in the table below.

Both sexes	Males	Females
63.6 years (life expectancy at birth, both sexes combined)	62.4 years (life expectancy at birth, males)	64.9 years (life expectancy at birth, females)

== Maternal, newborn and child health in Niger ==
On the Human Development Index, Niger ranks # 189 and for the past twenty years, Niger has made efforts to promote maternal, newborn and child health via institutional plans. From the structure of the Millennium Development Goals, Niger made significant growth on the Goal 4 with a decline in child mortality from 123 per 1,000 in 1992 to 52 per 1,000 in 2015.

In 2015, the goal of MDG 5 was to reduce maternal deaths by 175 per 1,000 live births, Niger, however reported 555 per 1,000 live births. Furthermore, the neonatal mortality rate in 2015 was 27 per 1000 live-births. These indicators contribute to major challenges for the health system and such challenges are being complicated by the inequality in the delivery of health services, non-functional and non-existing referral and antithetical-referral system such as emergency obstetric and neonatal care, inadequacy in the quantity and quality of healthcare human resources particularly midwives, gynecologists, and obstetricians, deficiency in the circulation of personnel, and scarce equipment, health structures and training institutions. Niger also experiences lack of skilled personnel in MNCH especially community outreach workers. Other challenges are socio-cultural barriers as regards family planning services, an insufficient and bumbling healthcare supervision structure crosswise the levels of the healthcare system.

As reported in the recent WHO data publication in 2018, maternal mortality in Niger was 5,655 or 3.20% of total deaths while the age adjusted death rate is 37.54 per 100,000 of population. This makes Niger rank #5 globally.

== Health status ==
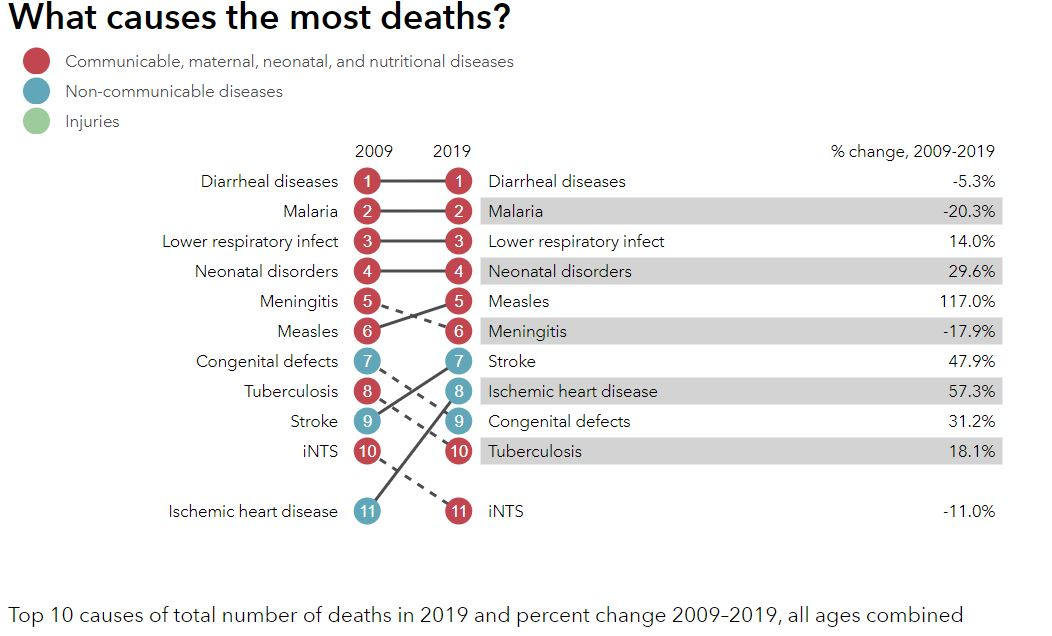
The 10 top causes of deaths in Niger.

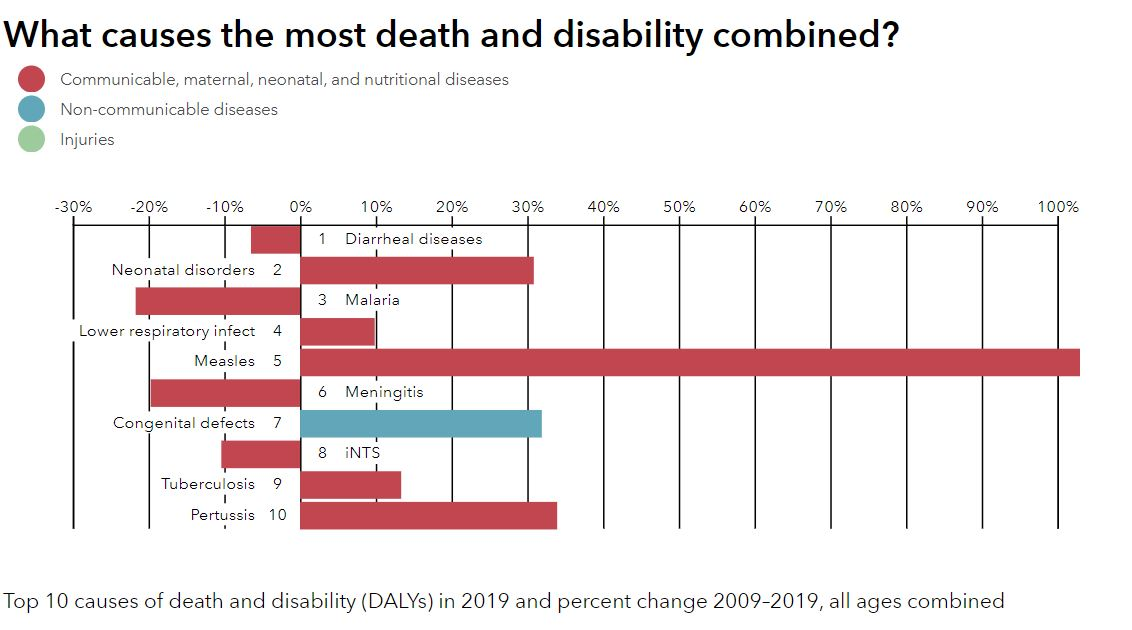

The above figures shows the total top 10 causes of deaths and DALYs (Disability Adjusted Life Years) from 2009 to 2019 in Niger.

== Diseases and notable outbreaks ==
Niger is prone to infectious disease outbreaks because of its poor ability to adequately handle and control communicable diseases. This results to the high risk of disease outbreaks due to lack of healthcare resources, poor sanitation, and restricted access to safe and clean water.

Highly prevalent communicable diseases in Niger are respiratory infections, hepatitis A, malaria, rabies, measles, tetanus, and waterborne parasitical and bacterial infections among others.

=== Diarrhea diseases ===
Diarrhea remains one of the leading killers of children, accounting for approximately 8% of all deaths among children under age 5 worldwide in 2017. This shows more than 1,400 young children dying daily, or an estimate of 525,000 children annually, even with the availability of an uncomplicated treatment solution. The latest WHO data publication in 2018 showed that diarrhea diseases deaths in Niger hit 19,169 or 10.86% of total deaths. The age adjusted Death Rate is 134.86 per 100,000 of population. This ranks Niger #7 in the world.

=== Malaria ===
Throughout the whole country of Niger, malaria is the main cause of illness and is endemic. It is reported that 28% of illnesses in Niger and 50% of reported deaths are as a result of malaria. From 2015 to 2019, there was a decline of 7.9% in malaria cases, that is, from 370 per 1,000 population to 343 per 1,000 population at risk. Also within the same period, there was a decline of 25.9% total of number deaths, that is, 0.919 per 1,000 population to 0.730 per 1,000 of the population at risk.

A report by the National Malaria Strategic Plan showed that between 2014 and 2015, under-five children accounted for approximately 3/5 of the burden of disease, that is, 62% and about 3/4 of malaria-related mortality in Niger, that is 74%.

=== Meningitis ===
Niger is one of the 26 countries within the belt of sub-Saharan Africa susceptible to seasonal outbreaks of Neisseria meningitidis: a meningococcal bacterial meningitis. These outbreaks tend to occur around the end of the "cold" season (temperatures dropping down to 15 degrees Celsius (59 degrees Fahrenheit) at night in some areas) in February to the beginning of the rainy season in May. The 2009 West African meningitis outbreak resulted in several thousand infections and more than one hundred deaths.

An outbreak of N. meningitidis serogroup C (NmC) happened in 2015, inflicting almost 10, 000 persons. Meanwhile, between 2009 and 2006, meningitis outbreaks caused by N. meningitidis serogroups A (NmA) and X (NmX), respectively, were recorded. WHO has prioritized the implementation of vaccines that can prevent bacterial meningitis globally, especially those targeting young children. Between 2014 and 2016, there was a gradual progress coverage for the 3 doses PCV13, that is, 13% to 76% between 2010 and 2016, there was an upward gain in the coverage of the 3 doses of Hib, that is, from 71% to 80% respectively.

The recent data publication by WHO in 2018 showed that the total deaths from meningitis was 7,508 or 4.25%. Also, the age adjusted death rate is 33.78 per 100,000 of population, making Niger rank #5 globally.

=== Measles ===
Measles outbreaks still occur in Niger, in part due to the low vaccination rate and in part due to seasonal migration of rural populations. Sporadic outbreaks in Nigerien communities were found to have occurred beginning at the end of the rainy season, when many rural populations begin seasonal migration pattern, with traveling children often missing their vital second immunization booster against the disease.

Data from the Nigerien Ministry of Public Health's Notifiable Diseases Register showed that this year, there has been an exponential increase in the number of cases in comparison to previous year. Between January and March 2021, Niger reported 3,213 cases of measles, in comparison 1,081 cases the same time in 2020. In 27 out of the 73 health districts especially Agadez, Dosso, and Tahoua, the measles epidemic was announced.

=== Neonatal disorders ===
The major leading causes of neonatal deaths in Niger in 2017 is shown in the pie chart below.

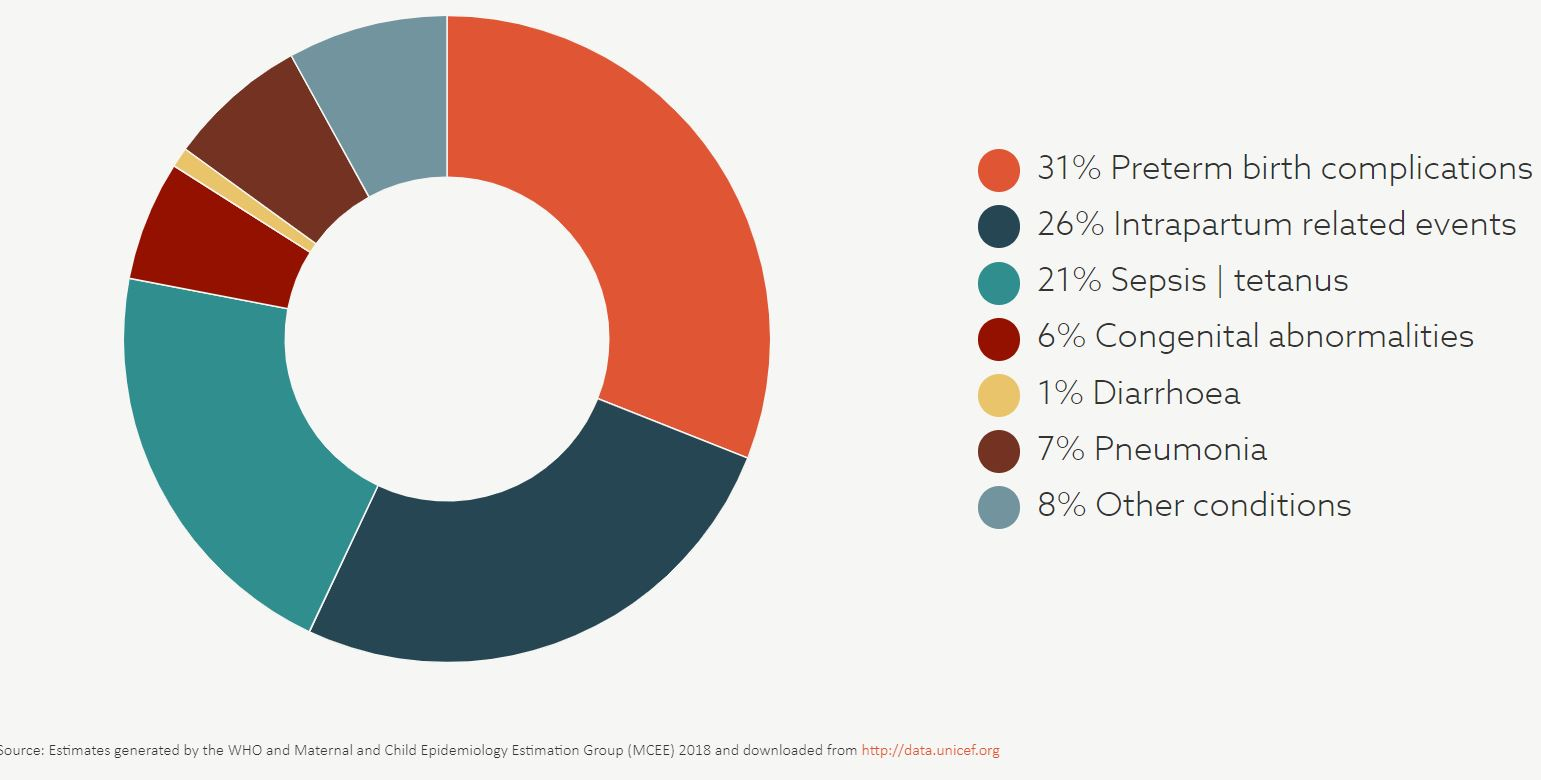
Leading causes of neonatal deaths in Niger in 2017.

=== Onchocerciasis ===
In January 2025, according to the World Health Organization, Niger became the first African country and the fifth country worldwide to eradicate onchocerciasis, a goal it had been working towards for several years.

=== HIV/AIDS ===
2008 estimates ranged from 44,000 to 85,000 people living with HIV in a nation of around 14 million, with an adult (aged 15 to 49) prevalence rate of between 0.6% and 1.1%. Adults aged 15 and up living with HIV were estimated to range from 42,000 to 81,000, with women of this age range making up about a third (12,000 to 26,000). Estimates of children (under 14) living with HIV were between 2,500 and 4,200. Total deaths were estimated to be between 3,000 and 5,600 per year. Aids orphans (under 17) were estimated at between 18,000 and 39,000.

=== Coronavirus/ COVID-19 ===
On 19 March 2020, the first case of COVID-19 in the country was confirmed in Niamey. Niger has so far recorded 5,908 COVID-19 cases, 199 deaths and 5,643 recoveries according to Worldometers.

=== Malaria ===
Malaria remains a major public health issue and is endemic throughout the country. As the primary cause of illness in Niger, malaria accounts for 28% of all illness and 50% of all recorded deaths. Children under five years of age account for about 62% of the burden of disease and 75% of malaria-related mortality. In 2015, Niger instituted a National Health Policy aimed at improving the equity of services and the quality of care by increasing access to health services for vulnerable people such as women, children, disabled people, and rural populations and exempted mothers and children under five years of age from health user fees.

The NMCP has focused its effort for reducing the burden of malaria morbidity and mortality through systematic use of diagnostic tools for suspected malaria cases and effective use of antimalarial medicines for confirmed cases. Niger's malaria program also supports prevention strategies, such as the prevention of malaria in pregnancy, mass drug distribution for seasonal malaria prevention, and vector control interventions including promoting consistent use of long lasting insecticide treated nets.

=== Polio ===
Polio, as recently as 2000 considered endemic in places, exists as a small number of cases annually, mostly imported from northern Nigeria which in 2005 was the home of around 40% of the world's confirmed cases.

== Potential impact of climate change on health ==
Climate change in form of regular incidences of droughts, storms, heatwaves and floods is a menace on the health and sanitation sector. In Niger, some main health issues are morbidity and mortality via vector-borne diseases like malaria; water-borne diseases such as cholera, diarrhea, measles, meningitis, respiratory infections related to severe weather conditions for example flooding and injuries, and also climate impacts on food and water supply which can lead to an increases the risk of malnutrition and hunger. There is a likelihood that several of these problems will develop more severity under climate change. In 2018, WHO reported about 8 million cases of malaria. Furthermore, there is an expectation that climate change will have an effect on the periods of malaria spread and the geographic areas of vector-borne diseases. In Niger, the overall risk of malaria is predicted to decrease as a result of the increasing temperatures.Nonetheless, a few districts are expected to become more susceptible to malaria, for example, as a result of more regular flooding incidences. Also, increase in temperature and low humidity as a result of climate change is likely to push forward the periodic commencement of meningitis, thereby possibly increasing cases of meningitis. Another menace by climate change is food security because in Niger, most households rely on about 40% of their food consumption form agricultural products. Temperature increase will lead to more regular heatwaves, causing increased heat-related mortality.

See also

- 2005–06 Niger food crisis
- Red Cross Society of Niger
