= First Lady of Niger =

- Incumbent; Unknown since 28 July 2023
- Residence: Presidential Palace, Niamey
- Inaugural holder: Aissa Diori
- Formation: 10 November 1960; 65 years ago

The First Lady of Niger (French: Première Dame du Niger) is the title and role attributed to the wife or wives of the President of Niger.

== History ==
The first ladies of Niger do not hold a specific political office or mandate. However, as the wives of Niger's presidents and heads of state, many first ladies became influential figures in Nigerien politics and the media. For example, several Nigerien first ladies established their own charitable foundations, which received substantial domestic media coverage.

Aissa Diori, wife of Niger's founding president, Hamani Diori, became the country's inaugural First Lady upon the country's independence in 1960. She was killed during the 1974 Nigerien coup d'état which overthrew her husband.

Niger is a predominantly Muslim country and polygamous marriages are recognized under customary law. Several presidents have been polygamous, with wives who often share the title and role of first lady. Recent examples have included President Mamadou Tandja (1999–2010) who had two wives, Laraba Tandja and Fati Tandja. Both of Tandja's wives claimed the role of first lady and established charitable foundations. President Mahamadou Issoufou (2011–2021), was married to First Lady Aïssata Issoufou Mahamadou and First Lady Dr. Lalla Malika Issoufou. Each of these first ladies also established their own, competing charities during Issoufou's presidency.

Niger's most recent, publicly known first lady is Hadiza Bazoum, wife of democratically elected President Mohamed Bazoum, who held the role from 2021 until 2023. On 26 July 2023, a coup d'état led by Presidential Guard Commander Abdourahamane Tiani, overthrew President Mohamed Bazoum. Since the July 2023 coup, Hadiza Bazoum and her husband have been held under house arrest in the Presidential Palace in Niamey by the National Council for the Safeguard of the Homeland military junta, led by Tiani.

The current military ruler of Niger is President Abdourahamane Tiani, leader of the National Council for the Safeguard of the Homeland military junta since the July 2023 coup. Tiani is married with five children, but very little is known about his wife yet, including her name.

== First Ladies of Niger ==
Name	Portrait	Term began	Term ended	President of Niger	Notes
Aissa Diori		10 November 1960	15 April 1974	Hamani Diori	Aissa Diori was the inaugural First Lady of Niger. She was killed during the 1974 Nigerien coup d'état on 15 April 1974 along with her Tuareg guards.
Mintou Kountché		15 April 1974	10 November 1987	Seyni Kountché	
Name or names uncertain		10 November 1987	16 April 1993	Ali Saibou	President Ali Saibou, the third President of Niger, was polygamous. He had two wives (and 17 children) at the time of his death in 2011.
Nana Mariama Ibrahim Adjia		16 April 1993	27 January 1996	Mahamane Ousmane	First democratically elected president of Niger. He was overthrown by Ibrahim Baré Maïnassara in the 1996 Nigerien coup d'état.
Clémence Aïssa Baré		27 January 1996	9 April 1999	Ibrahim Baré Maïnassara	Former First Lady Clémence Aïssa Baré is a physician specializing in parasitology and HIV/AIDS and headed her own foundation during her tenure. Since 1999, she has campaigned for the prosecution of those responsible for the assassination of her husband during the 1999 Nigerien coup d'état.
Name uncertain		9 April 1999	22 December 1999	Daouda Malam Wanké	Short-lived Military junta following the 1999 Nigerien coup d'état. The name of Wanké's wife is uncertain.
Laraba Tandja		22 December 1999	18 February 2010	Mamadou Tandja	President Mamadou Tandja had two wives, each with their own charitable foundations. First Lady Laraba Tandja headed the Magama Foundation, whuch focused on HIV and AIDS. President Tandja was overthrown in the 2010 Nigerien coup d'état after extending his rule.
Fati Tandja		22 December 1999	18 February 2010	Mamadou Tandja	First Lady Fati Tandja headed the PALU Foundation
Fati Alzouma Djobo Salou		18 February 2010	7 April 2011	Salou Djibo	Djibo was a Nigerien Army officer who led the military coup of 18 February 2010 after President Tandja attempted to extend his rule. Head of the Supreme Council for the Restoration of Democracy until new elections in 2011. His wife, Fati Alzouma Djobo Salou, was first lady of Niger during this time.
Aïssata Issoufou Mahamadou		7 April 2011	2 April 2021	Mahamadou Issoufou	President Mahamadou Issoufou has two wives, who shared the title and role of First Lady. Aïssata Issoufou is a chemist and chemical engineer. She headed her own Guri Vie Meilleure Foundation as first lady.
Lalla Malika Issoufou		7 April 2011	2 April 2021	Mahamadou Issoufou	Dr. Lalla Malika Issoufou, President Issoufou's second wife, is a medical doctor. As first lady, she established the Tatali Hilali Foundation.
Hadiza Bazoum		2 April 2021	26 July 2023	Mohamed Bazoum	Former First Lady Hadiza Bazoum is a lawyer. Her husband, President Mohamed Bazoum, was overthrown by the Presidential Guard Commander Abdourahamane Tiani in the 2023 Nigerien coup d'état on 26 July 2023. Since the July 2023 coup, Hadiza Bazoum and her husband have been held under house arrest in the Presidential Palaceby the National Council for the Safeguard of the Homeland military junta led by Tiani.
Name unknown'		28 July 2023		Abdourahamane Tiani	Military officer Abdourahamane Tiani seized power in the 2023 Nigerien coup d'état on 26 July 2023. He has been president of the National Council for the Safeguard of the Homeland military junta since 28 July 2023 and was declared the 11th president of Niger on 26 March 2025 for five years. Tiani is married with five children, but the name of his wife is not currently known.
