= For the Best and for the Onion =

For the Best and for the Onion (French: Pour le meilleur et pour l'oignon)
- Directed by: Sani Elhadj Magori
- Written by: Sani Elhadj Magori
- Produced by: Malam Saguirou
- Cinematography: Salissou Rabé; Malam Saguirou
- Edited by: François Pit
- Production companies: Adalios; Dangarama; Les Films du Kutus; TV Rennes 35
- Release date: 2008
- Running time: 52 minutes
- Countries: Niger; France
- Languages: Hausa; French

For the Best and for the Onion (French: Pour le meilleur et pour l'oignon) is a 2008 Nigerien documentary film about onion farmers in Galmi, Niger, written and directed by Sani Elhadj Magori.

== Synopsis ==
Filmed in the director's hometown over the course of a single growing season, the film follows how the price of onions affects the lives of two young villagers who wish to wed, while the father of the would-be bride, Yaro, struggles to make enough from his crop to be able to offer his daughter a fitting marriage.

== Awards and festivals ==
- 2008, Prix Jean Rouch, Forum Africain du Film Documentaire de Niamey
- 2009, International Jury Prize and Prix du jury jeunes lycéen, Festival international de films sur la ruralité de Ville-sur-Yron (France)
- 2009, Africa Movie Academy Awards, Best Documentary Feature
- 2009, Terra di Tutti Film Festival (Italy), Best Foreign Film Award
- 2010, Pan African Film & Arts Festival (Los Angeles), Best Short Documentary
- 2010 Cannes Film Festival, Selected to Cinémas du monde section
