= Georgia Alliance of African American Attorneys =

- Logo of the Georgia Alliance of African American Attorneys
- Formation: June 1992
- Type: Legal Society
- Headquarters: Atlanta, Georgia
- Location: United States
- Members: 1600+
- President: Charla Hall
- Website: www.gaaaa.org

The Georgia Alliance of African American Attorneys (GAAAA) is a minority bar association in the state of Georgia in the United States. Founded in 1992, the GAAAA was created as a result of the legal case of Tyrone Brooks, et al., v. Georgia State Board of Elections and Max Cleland, Secretary of State and Chairman of the Georgia State Board of Elections (997 F.2d 857). The State of was accused of not having enough diversity in judges. The litigation resulted in Georgia having the second-largest number of African American judges in any American state—second only to the state of Michigan.

The Georgia Alliance of African American Attorneys has been at the forefront of issues facing the African American community. The organization boasts a strong network of attorney and non-attorney members across Georgia, and utilizes its influence to impact change in the African American community. GAAAA has been instrumental in several challenges, including election protection, indigent defense, African American Attorney support, and voting rights issues. The organization is currently called on to represent the interest of African American Attorneys in the State Legislature, and is seated on various panels across the State of Georgia.

The GAAAA serves as a partner with the NAACP to redress legal issues that impact its members in the Southern region. The organization hosts Continuing Legal Education opportunities yearly, as well as its signature event at the State Bar Annual meeting, known as the "Conviction of Honor".

== Programs ==
=== Indigent defense programs ===
The Indigent Defense program monitors and works closely with the Georgia Indigent Defense Program, which provides representation to the state's poor who have been charged criminally. The program came under controversy in 2004 when it challenged the State for not providing what it though was adequate representation to indigents, and for not having enough minority attorneys to represent indigent defendants. This challenge resulted in a change to the state's system and improved the representation of minority attorneys who represent the indigent.

=== Street Law Program ===
The Street Law Program provides free on-site legal advice quarterly to the community. Members of the organization from various areas of practice volunteer their time and give legal advice free of charge.

=== Conviction of Honor ===
The Conviction of Honor is the flagship program of GAAAA. The event is held annually during the GAAAA Christmas party at the State Bar of Georgia. The organization honors those members who have made significant contributions to the community and to the ideals of the organization in a mock trial, where the honorees are "convicted" for their service to the profession and community. The event began in December 2007 and has garnered accolades and a large audience due to its innovative format of honoring those who are convicted. The list of those honored in the Conviction of Honor include:

Thelma Wyatt Cummings Moore (2007)

Presented with the William H. Rehnquist Award for Judicial Excellence on November 15, 2001, at the United States Supreme Court, she was the first woman and African American to serve on the benches of the Superior Court of Fulton County, the State Court of Fulton County, the City Court of Atlanta, and the Atlanta Municipal Court. She was recipient of the Thurgood Marshall Award at the 36th Annual National Bar Association Judicial Council Luncheon.

Bernice King (2007)

King is an associate minister at New Birth Missionary Baptist Church. She created a mentoring program for young girls, and founded the Be A King Scholarship at Spelman College at Atlanta in honor of her mother. King donated $100,000 of her personal funds, while $75,000 was donated from Home Depot and $15,000 from New Birth Missionary Baptist Church. The scholarship will be awarded to two rising seniors at Spelman college who are majoring in music, education or psychology. President of SCLC (Southern Christian Leadership Conference).

Tyrone Brooks (2008)

Brooks was the litigant in case that created the GAAAA. He became active in the Southern Christian Leadership Conference as a volunteer, and by 1967 he was a full-time employee. He was arrested in 1976 in Washington, D.C., while protesting outside the South African Embassy; he has been arrested more than 65 times for his civil rights activism. In 1980 Brooks was elected to the Georgia House of Representatives, where he continues to serve. He is active on a number of committees, and led a push to remove Confederate symbols from the Georgia state flag. He received his first honorary degree from the John Marshall School of Law in 2001 as a result of his successful campaign to change the state flag. He is president of the Georgia Association of Black Elected Officials, and is a member of the Georgia Legislative Black Caucus. He is still involved in the civil rights movement. He received Public Servant Award from the Atlanta City Council, was inducted into the NAACP Hall of Fame, and named one of the 50 Most Influential Men in Georgia by the Georgia Coalition of Black Women. As of 2013 "Brooks faces 30 federal charges of wire, tax and mail fraud related to his work with a pair of charities. The U.S. Attorney’s office alleges that Brooks used contributions meant for those charities for his personal expenses." A three-member panel appointed by Georgia's Governor decided in June 2013 that Brooks may stay in office while facing Federal indictment.

Marvin S. Arrington, Sr. (2008)

Arrington teamed with Bill Cosby to host a series of mentorship talks to young high school students throughout the city of Atlanta. He is a retired Judge from the Fulton County Superior Court, and served as President of the Atlanta City Council for 17 years. He was a candidate for Mayor of Atlanta in 1997, and one of the first two black students to undertake full-time studies at the Emory University School of Law in 1965. He presently serves on the Clark Atlanta University and Emory Board of Trustees, which are both of his Alma Maters.

== Organization leadership ==
This is a list of presidents of the GAAAA. The term of office was one year until AbuBakr's term, when the term was changed to two years. The Presidential election and service is non-partisan, so the candidate does not represent their city when elected.

Name	Years	City of origin
Tony L. Axam	1992–1993	Atlanta
Ivory Ken Dious	1993–1994	Athens
Harriet E. Abubakr	1994–1996	Fayetteville
Brenda C. Youmas	1996–1998	Macon
Verna L. Smith	1998–2000	Dublin
John M. Clark	2000–2002	Elberton
Gwendolyn S. Fortson-Waring	2002 – 2005 (served more than one term)	Savannah
Kimberly L. Copeland	2005–2007	Jesup
Antavius M. Weems	2007–2009	Atlanta
Charla A. Hall	2009–2011	Atlanta
Jacob Daughtry, II	2016–2018	Atlanta
