= Galmi Hospital =

- Serving In Mission

Geography
- Location: Galmi, Niger
- Coordinates: 13.969461°N 5.666702°E

Organisation
- Care system: Non-profit
- Type: District General

Services
- Emergency department: Yes

Helipads
- Helipad: No

Links
- Website: galmi.org
- Lists: Hospitals in Niger

Galmi Hospital is a 184-bed mission rural general hospital administered by SIM (Serving In Mission) in the Nigerien village of Galmi. Galmi Hospital is staffed by doctors and nurses from all over the world, as well as locally trained medical personnel. Patients travel from surrounding villages and countries to receive medical attention. The hospital also has a working HIV Program as well as Nutritional Rehabilitation.
