= Atlantic City Rescue Mission =

Rescue mission for the South of New Jersey, US

- Formation: 1964; 62 years ago
- Founder: John Fink
- Founded at: Atlantic City, New Jersey
- Location(s): 2009 Bacharach Blvd; Atlantic City, New Jersey 08401
- Coordinates: 39.36500°N 74.44001°W
- Services: Rescue mission Soup kitchen Homeless shelter Food bank
- Website: www.acrescuemission.org

Atlantic City Rescue Mission (ACRM) is a rescue mission founded in 1964 by John Fink with the purpose of supporting residents in South Jersey in the United States. The rescue mission provides food banks, a soup kitchen and homeless shelter. ACRM assists over 3,300 homeless and people in need of assistance per year. It is the largest provider of comprehensive services in New Jersey, serve approximately 20% of people in the state.

== History ==
The Atlantic City Rescue Mission was founded in 1964 by John Fink. Initially the rescue mission provided food and shelter to a few homeless men from a "small storefront in Atlantic City". In 1970, ACRM moved to a larger facility on Bacharach Boulevard and provided 27 men shelter and a 90-day work-therapy program.

In 1975, a second shelter was opened for women. After the introduction of gambling to Atlantic City in 1978, the increase of people seeking assistance went beyond the main facility’s capacity, causing problems. In 1990, the facility had expanded to include 312 people. The women's programs relocated to the same building as men.

Atlantic City Rescue Mission began its Women’s Overcomers Program in 2000. In 2003, the 90-day work program was expanded to 120 days. In August 2012, homeless seeking shelter were no longer able to go directly to the building and were "referred to the Atlantic County Office Building on Atlantic Avenue, nearly a mile away, before they can be admitted to the shelter".

Hamilton Mall investments and associates support ACRM through fundraisers. In 2010, director Barry Durham, who opposed gambling, stated that 22% of people served by ACRM cited gambling as the cause of their homelessness.

During the January 2019 North American cold wave, ACRM provided emergency services and shelter to help homeless people escape the dangerous cold.

Miss America contestants have served dinner at ACRM as part of a public outreach program. In 2015, 52 Contestants at Miss America participated in the Miss America Serves program at the ACRM. In 2017, 51 Miss America contestants served meals and provided assistance to ACRM.
