= Lamordé University Hospital =

Hôpital National Amirou Boubacar Diallo

Geography
- Location: Niamey, Niger
- Coordinates: 13.504010°N 2.081947°E

Organisation
- Care system: Public
- Type: Teaching
- Affiliated university: Abdou Moumouni University

Services
- Beds: 72

Links
- Lists: Hospitals in Niger

Hôpital National Amirou Boubacar Diallo is a teaching hospital in Niamey, Niger. Affiliated with Abdou Moumouni University, the facility has 72 beds. It was the first public hospital in Niger to provide fistula repair services.
