= Red Cross Society of Niger =

- Founded: 1963
- Type: Non-profit organisation
- Purpose: Humanitarian Aid
- Location: Namibia
- Affiliations: International Committee of the Red Cross; International Federation of Red Cross and Red Crescent Societies

Red Cross Society of Niger (RCN; French: Croix-Rouge nigérienne) was founded in 1963. It has its headquarters in Niamey. It is a part of the International Red Cross and Red Crescent Movement.
