= Galmi =

- Location in Niger
- Coordinates: 13.966°N 5.675°E
- Country: Niger
- Region: Tahoua Region
- Department: Birni-N'Konni Department

Population
  - Total: 8,000–10,000
  - Summer (DST): UTC+1

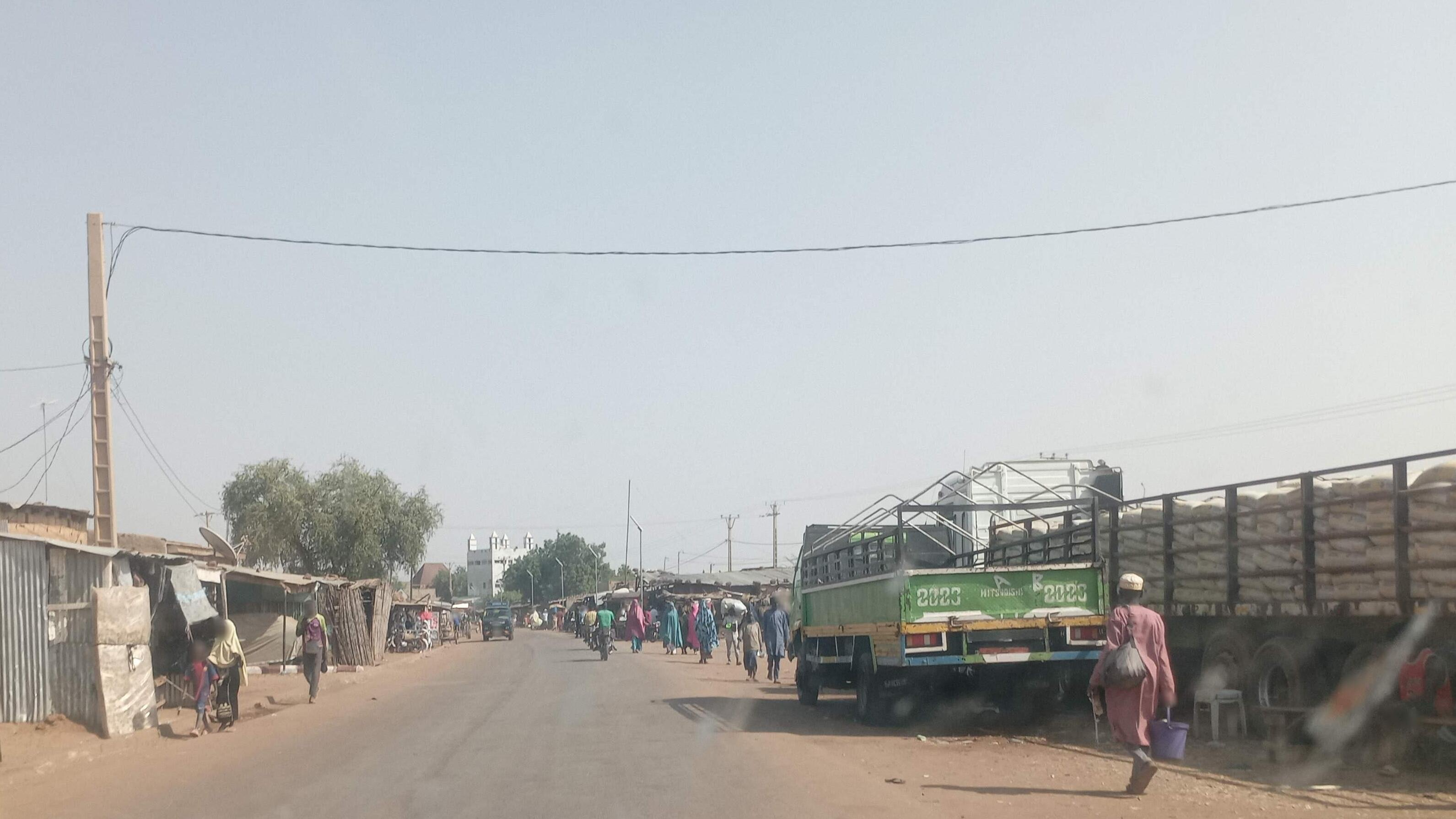
A road in Galmi

Galmi, Niger, is a village of about 8,000–10,000 residents. It is located 500 kilometres (310 mi) east of Niamey on the east–west highway between Birnin Konni and Maradi. It is on the southern edge of the Sahara Desert is thus an arid area with a dry, rocky landscape.

Galmi is well known for its purple and red onions popular in West Africa. Onion farming in the village was the subject of the Nigerien documentary film For the Best and for the Onion.

A well-known landmark is the missions hospital, Galmi Hospital. The hospital compound is lush with vegetation from a local well compared to the surrounding area.
