= Presidential Palace, Niamey =

Residence of the President of Niger

Coordinates: 13.5156°N 2.0943°E

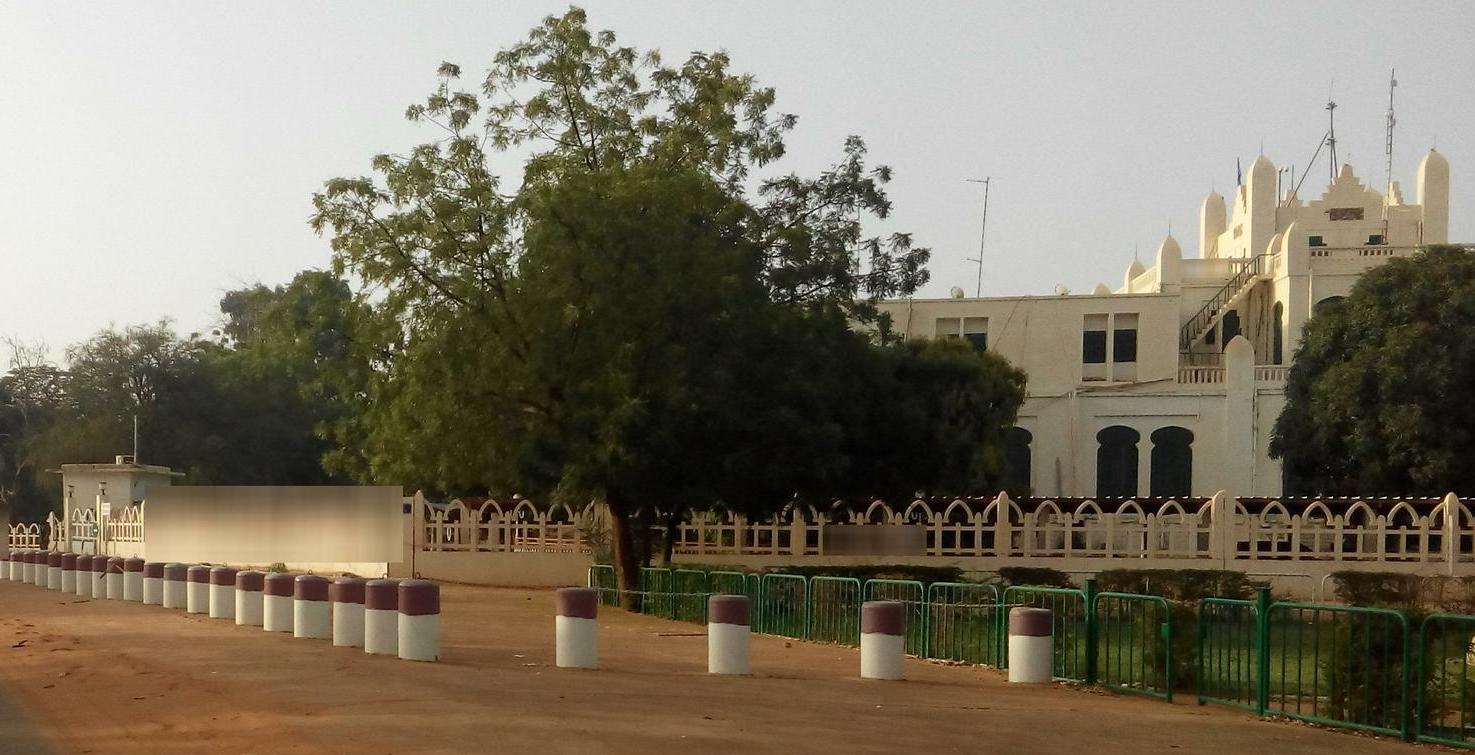
The old Presidential Palace in Niamey, located across the Boulevard de la République from the new palace. The old Presidential Palace was used from 1960 until 2021, when it was replaced by the new residence.

The Presidential Palace is the official residence of the president of the Republic of Niger. The palace and surrounding presidential complex are located along the Boulevard de la République in Niamey on the banks of the Niger River. The present Presidential Palace was constructed in the early 2020s, replacing the former French colonial era palace which had been used since Independence in 1960.

On 26 July 2023, President Mohamed Bazoum was targeted in a coup d'état while he was being held inside his palace by soldiers from the presidential guard. The palace was again attacked in a 2026 coup attempt.
