= National Hospital (Niamey) =

Coordinates: 13.5135°N 2.1016°E

National HospitalNational Hospital
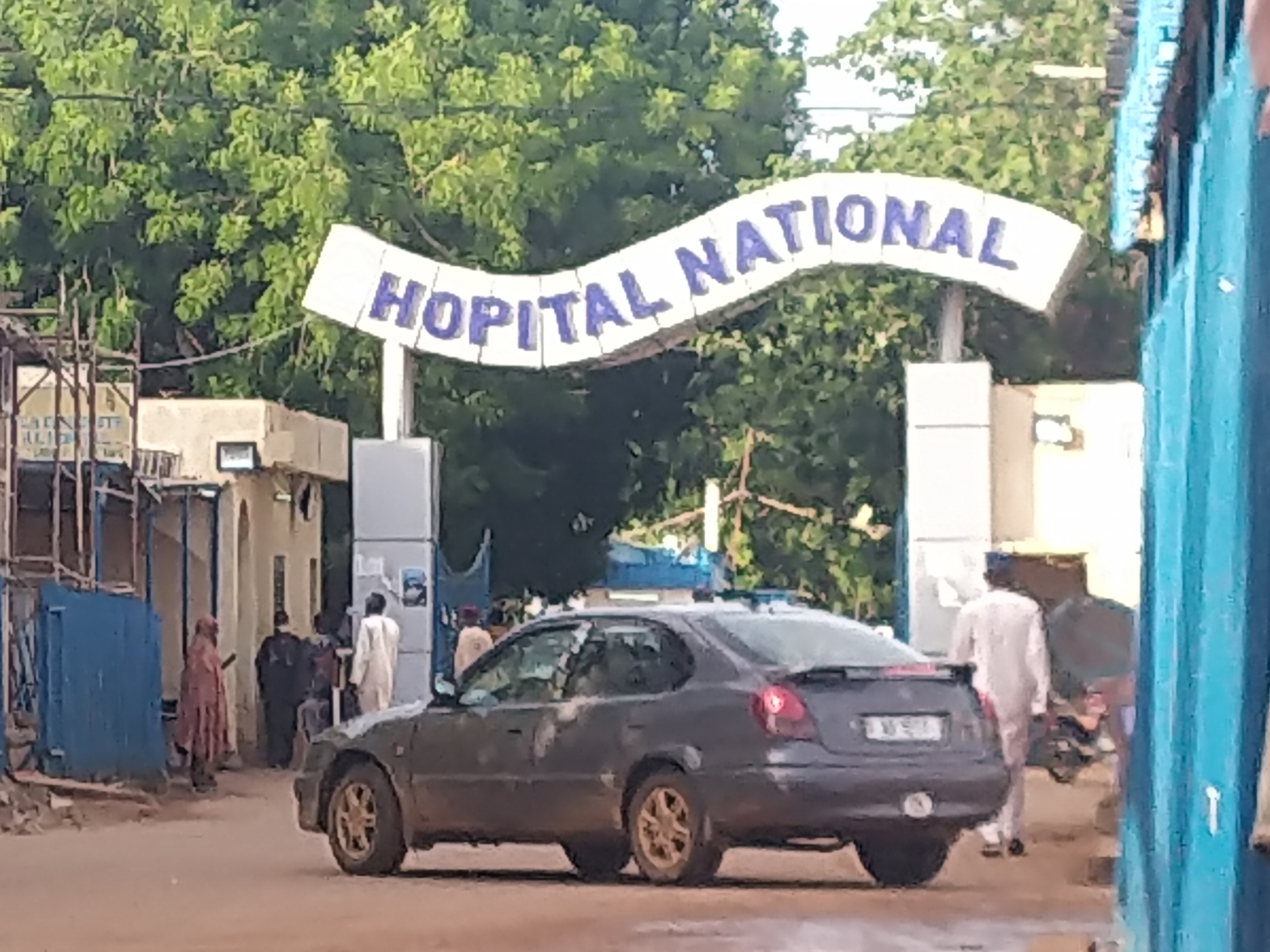
- Portail Hôpital National de Niamey

Geography
- Location: Niamey, Niger

Organisation
- Care system: Public
- Type: District General

Services
- Emergency department: Yes
- Beds: 244 beds.

Helipads
- Helipad: No

History
- Founded: 1922

The National Hospital is a government founded district general hospital in Niamey, Niger. It has 244 beds. The hospital was founded in 1922.

== Services ==
The hospital provides a wide range of services to residents of Niamey and the greater region. As of September, 2018 the National Hospital has two Otolaryngologists, two Ophthalmologists, five Radiologists, three Cardiologists, three Dermatologists, four Obsetricians/Gynecologists, five dentists and one psychiatrist.
