= Elections in Niger =

Elections in Niger take place within the framework of a semi-presidential system. The President and National Assembly are elected by the public, with elections organised by the Independent National Electoral Commission (CENI).

== Electoral history ==
Following World War II, French political reforms meant that Niger began to elect members to the French National Assembly. The first of these elections took place on 21 October 1945, with Niger and neighbouring French Sudan (now Mali) combined into a single constituency. Two MPs were elected using separate electoral colleges for French citizens and Africans. The next elections for the combined constituency held in June 1946. By the November 1946 elections, Niger had become a single-member seat, which was won by Hamani Diori of the Nigerien Progressive Party (PPN).

A General Council was established in the same period and was first elected in December 1946 and January 1947. In 1948 Niger was given a second seat in the French National Assembly, which was filled in a by-election in June that year, with Georges Condat of the Union of Nigerien Independents and Sympathisers elected. French elections were held again in 1951, with both seats won by UNIS. The General Council was converted into the Territorial Assembly in 1952, with the first elections to the new body resulting in a victory for UNIS, which won all 35 Second College seats.

The final French National Assembly election in Niger was held in 1956, with the PPN and an alliance of the Nigerien Action Bloc (BNA) and Nigerien Progressive Union (UPN) of Condat winning one seat each. The 1957 Territorial Assembly elections were won by Sawaba, which took 41 of the 60 seats. However, in early elections the following year, Sawaba was defeated by the Union for the Franco-African Community alliance, which included the PPN.

Upon independence in 1960, the PPN became the sole legal party. The country's first presidential elections were held in September 1965, with Diori as the sole candidate. Parliamentary elections later in the year resulted in the PPN winning all 50 seats. Presidential and parliamentary elections in 1970 were held under the same system with the same result.

A 1974 coup removed the PPN from power, and elections were not held again until 1989, when general elections were called, with the National Movement for the Society of Development (MNSD), established earlier in the year, as the sole party. Ali Saibou (who had been in power since 1987) was re-elected President, with the MNSD winning all 93 seats in the National Assembly.

By 1993 other political parties had been legalised, and the first multi-party parliamentary elections since independence were held in February 1993. The MNSD emerged as the largest party, but won only 29 of the 83 seats; opposition parties subsequently formed the Alliance of the Forces of Change, which had a parliamentary majority. In the presidential elections shortly afterwards, Mahamane Ousmane of the Democratic and Social Convention was elected in the second round, defeating Mamadou Tandja of the MNSD (who had received the most votes in the first round). Following a split in the AFC, early parliamentary elections were held in 1995, but did not significantly alter the makeup of the National Assembly.

A coup in January 1996 led to presidential elections in July, in which coup leader Ibrahim Baré Maïnassara was elected. The National Union of Independents for Democratic Renewal, formed to support him, won an absolute majority in the parliamentary elections later in the year amidst an opposition boycott. Another coup in 1999 led to general elections that year. Tandja was elected president and the MNSD emerged as the largest party in the National Assembly with 38 of the 83 seats. The 2004 elections saw Tandja re-elected and the MNSD remain the largest party.

A 2009 referendum resulted in the constitution being suspended and presidential elections being delayed. The parliamentary elections went ahead, with an opposition boycott allowing the MNSD to win a majority. However, Tandja was removed from office in a 2010 coup and general elections were held in 2011, which saw Mahamadou Issoufou of the Nigerien Party for Democracy and Socialism (PNDS) elected president and the PNDS become the largest party in the National Assembly. Issoufou was re-elected in 2016 general elections, with the second round of the presidential elections boycotted by the opposition. The PNDS made significant gains in the parliamentary elections, but failed to win a majority.

== Electoral system ==
The President is elected for a five-year term using the two-round system. The 171 members of the National Assembly are elected by three methods. The majority, 158, are elected from eight multi-member constituencies based on the seven regions and the Niamey metropolitan region; seats are allocated using the simple quotient and the highest averages method under proportional representation, and there is a 5% electoral threshold. A further eight members are elected from single-member constituencies to represent ethnic minorities, whilst five are elected from single-member constituencies to represent Nigeriens living abroad, with one constituency for each continent. The single member constituencies are elected on a first-past-the-post (FPTP) basis.

== Referendums ==
During the French colonial era, French citizens in Niger were able to vote in French referendums held in 1945, May 1946 and October 1946. In 1958 a constitutional referendum was held across the French colonial empire; rejection would result in immediate independence, whilst approval would result in the territory joining the French Community. In Niger the referendum was approved by 78% of voters.

The next referendum was held in 1987 on a National Charter that would establish non-elective, consultative institutions at both national and local levels, with official results showing 99.6% voting in favour. A constitutional referendum two years later saw the new constitution approved by a similar margin. Another constitutional referendum in 1992, which proposed reintroducing multi-party democracy, was approved by 90% of voters.

The 1996 coup led to a referendum that saw a new constitution approved by 92% of voters, whilst the 1999 coup resulted in another new constitution receive the approval of 90% of voters. A referendum in 2009 proposed suspending the constitution pending a rewrite, and was approved by 92.5% of voters, although it led to a constitutional crisis that resulted in another coup and another constitutional referendum in 2010, with 90% backing the new constitution.
