= History of Niamey =

The city of Niamey was developed by French colonists in Niger from a cluster of villages on the Niger River. These villages were settled around the early nineteenth century by Hausa, Songhai, and Zarma people on the river's left bank and Fula people on the right bank. A series of French expeditions invaded the area in the 1890s, with the first record of Niamey in 1897. Captain Henri Salaman established a French post on the plateau of the left bank in 1901. The territorial capital moved from Zinder to Niamey in 1903 but moved back in 1911 after debate among officials. Niamey did not see widespread development before becoming the capital again in 1926. Niamey then became Niger's main centre of economic development. The first urban plan in 1930 divided the city into European and indigenous areas. After a population increase caused by the 1931 Niger famine, further urban planning involved hygiene initiatives and relocation of existing settlements. The administration used forced labour for development until 1946, the same year Niger became an overseas territory of France.

Niamey held the first municipal elections in Niger in 1956, electing as mayor the pro-independence trade unionist Djibo Bakary. Niger gained independence in 1960, after which Niamey saw further development under President Hamani Diori, and urban plans ended racial segregation of neighbourhoods amid population growth. The opening of the Kennedy Bridge in 1970 enabled development on the right bank of the river. A boom in the uranium industry of Niger in the 1970s and 1980s brought economic and architectural growth to Niamey, alongside immigrants displaced by droughts. This led to a population increase and urban sprawl. Protests in Niamey following the 1990 Kennedy Bridge massacre contributed to the democratisation of Niger. The era of democratisation saw an economic decline in Niamey as well as an increase in private media and an Islamic revival. In the 1990s and 2000s, Niamey underwent reorganisation and decentralisation, followed by recentralisation in 2011. The 2010s saw urban development in Niamey including the Niamey Nyala project of President Mahamadou Issoufou.

== Background and foundation ==
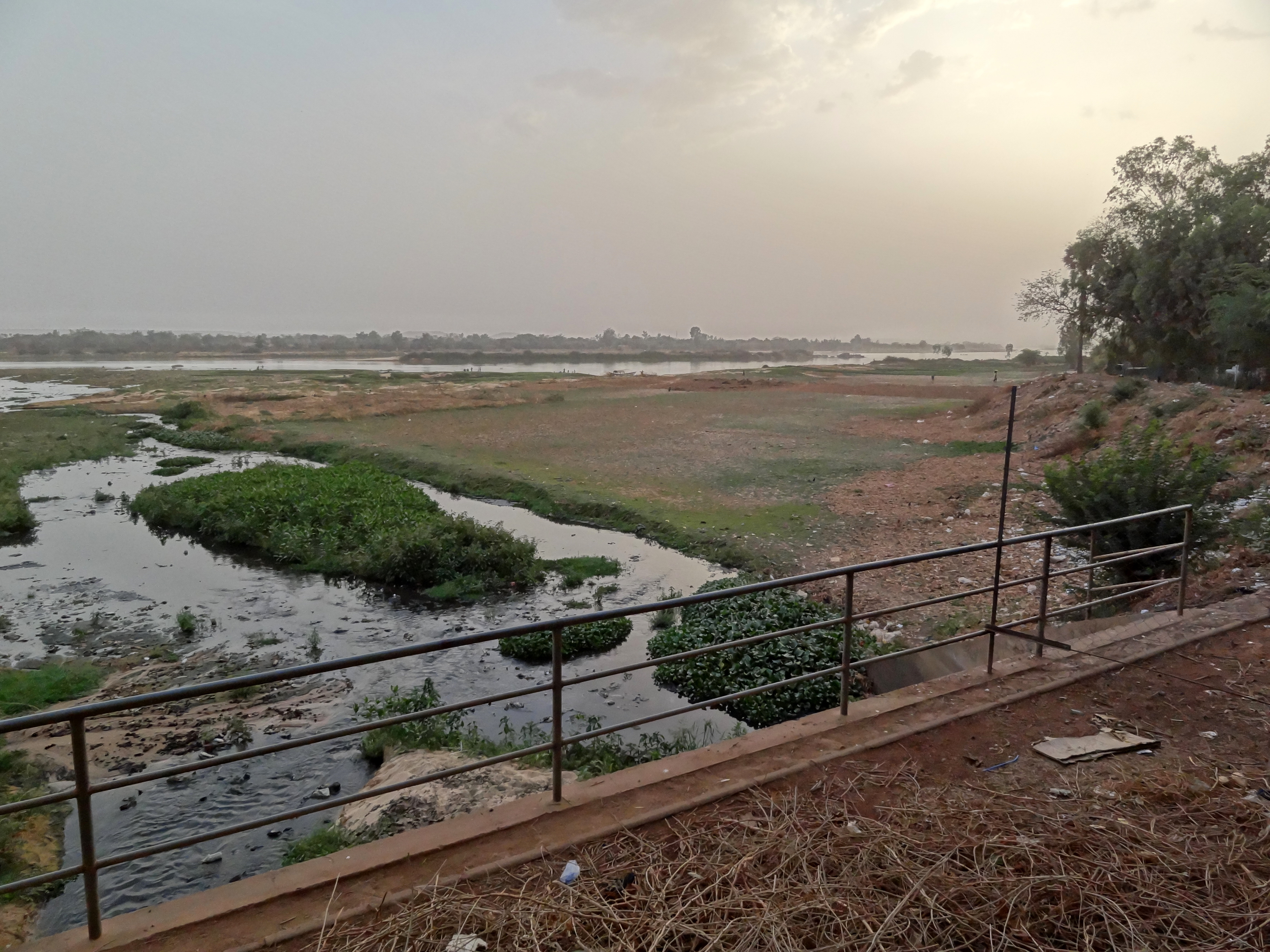
The gully of Gounti Yéna was the site of villages in the nineteenth century

As the Sahelian kingdoms fought for control over the Sahel, the Niamey area was a buffer zone whose sociopolitical instability caused Trans-Saharan trade routes to divert around it. Though the Sahelian kingdoms were urbanised, the Niamey area, situated between these kingdoms, was not. Despite its lack of activity, this area had a diverse population. Late-sixteenth-century residents included Zarma and other Songhai refugees from the Moroccan invasion of the Songhai Empire, Hausa-speaking Maouri hunters who migrated westward from the Dogondoutchi area, and the regionally dominant Fula people. These ethnic groups comprise the population of modern Niamey. Archaeological evidence of bloomery along the Niger River indicates that metalworking may have returned to the Niamey area around this time, having become absent around the late 14th century.

The Zarma villages of Goudel and Gamkalé were founded on the left bank of the Niger River in the sixteenth century. The two villages' land claims were divided by the gully of Gounti Yéna. Villages sprouted along Gounti Yéna, on the site of modern Niamey, around the early nineteenth century. The Hausa village of Maourey, the Zarma village of Kalley, and the Songhai fishing village of Gaweye were on the left bank, while the Fula villages of Lamordé, Nogaré, and Kirkissoye were on the right bank. To the east, the village of Saga—now part of the urban agglomeration of Niamey—was inhabited by pastoralists of the Zarma, Fula, and Kurtey Songhai ethnic groups.

Oral histories differ on the chronology of the settlement of Niamey and on the etymology of the name Niamey, as each of the city's original ethnic groups believes its village was settled first:

- The Maouri believe that they founded the city after a property dispute with the Fula villagers of Bitinkodji drove them away from the nearby river island of Néni Goungou. They settled next to a landmark tree called Gna(or niami), which they believe was magical; the former site of the tree is now the Hotel Gaweye. Thus, the Maouri say the city's etymology is place of the Gna, or Gna-mé.
- The Zarma believe that the founder was a Kallé Zarma chief from named Kouri Mali, who left the Zarmaganda region due to a dispute over his family's land. The villagers of Goudel gave him land between Yantala and Gamkal Sebangayé. The Zarma say the city's name is derived from his exclamation of "wa gnam ne", meaning "clear out here" or "settle here". Another Zarma etymology says that the name means "mother's riverbank", referring to the site where a woman received water.
- The Songhai believe that the founders were two fishermen from Gao who settled on the left bank after being gifted the river island of Yama Gungu—which remains under Songhai ownership—out of gratitude by the local Fula herders.

Additionally, historian Abdourahmane Idrissa proposes an etymology from a Zarma or Songhai word meaning "intermingling".

== Colonial era ==
=== French invasion and military rule ===
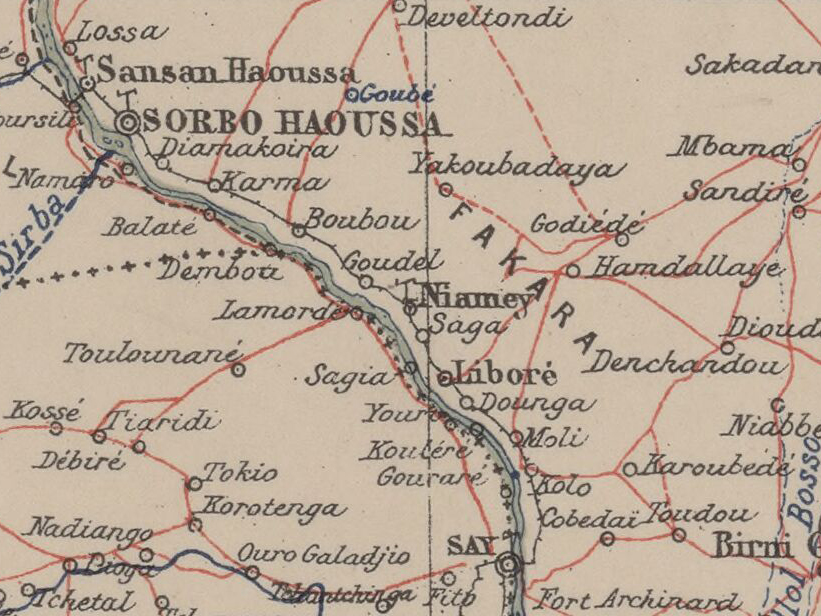
1903 French map showing Niamey and nearby settlements

France laid claim to Niger during the Scramble for Africa, by which time western Niger had been weakened by local conflicts. According to anthropologist Jean-Pierre Olivier de Sardan, no rulers in the region had sustained rule over more than five villages in the eighteenth and nineteenth centuries. The closest polity to Niamey had been the Sokoto Caliphate. The lack of a large local power facilitated the French invasion of Niger, which completed the expansion of French West Africa, a territory administered from Dakar. French officials entered Niger in 1891, when the expedition of Parfait-Louis Monteil came to Say, a chiefdom twenty kilometers downriver of Niamey; several earlier European expeditions had traversed the area. The first European mention of Niamey was by the 1897 expedition of Émile Auguste Léon Hourst. Anthropologist Suzanne Bernus recorded an account by a resident of 1890s Niamey, Djibo Salifou, who recalled an earlier visit by a European boat, identified as the expedition of Georges Joseph Toutée. The second record of Niamey was by the Voulet–Chanoine Mission of 1899, which aimed to establish French presence beyond Say. This expedition burned down Niamey due to the hostility of its inhabitants, who had expected a peaceful trading mission.

France established the troupes coloniales (transl. colonial troops) in 1900 and established garrisons in the territory of Niger. French settlers came to Niamey in 1901 after the expedition of Eugène Lenfant. That year, Henri Salaman, a captain overseeing the road between Niger and Chad, founded the first French military post in Niger. The location was chosen for its geography—its high ground lowered the risk of flooding and mosquitoes, while its location above a river bend enabled creation of a port to service administrators traveling between Zinder and Timbuktu. The river connected the city to Bamako and the rest of French West Africa, and the administration thought the location was good for securing control over the inland part of the territory. Salaman was the first to refer to the whole cluster of villages as Niamey, and he rented a house in Niamey. He named Niamey the capital of the cercle of Djerma in 1903. Niamey's residents viewed him as a bringer of peace and development, and the city became known in Hausa as "garin captin Salma", meaning "Captain Salaman's city". French settlement of Niamey began on an empty plateau on the left bank, in an area that would later become the quartier of Terminus. This neighbourhood was developed under Salaman's administration, with a governor's office, post office, and treasury.

Zinder, in eastern Niger, became the territorial capital in 1901. The capital moved to Niamey in 1903, after a Tuareg revolt had weakened the eastern part of the territory. The French government organised a large area surrounding the capital into the Canton of Niamey. The first chief of the canton was a commoner named Bagniou, who had worked as a guide for the Voulet–Chanoine Mission, which made him locally unpopular. The new canton included several former chiefdoms, including the Songhai chiefdom of Karma, which led to a dispute with the leader of Karma. To make Niamey more powerful than other towns in the area, Salaman introduced incentives such as suspending taxation and forced labour for the town's residents, while increasing taxation for other towns. He also offered free land, given by the villagers of Kalley, and established a livestock market. These caused Niamey's population to increase.

The Third Military Territory of Niger was declared on 26 December 1904, spanning to Lake Chad in the east and farther than Timbuktu in the west. Niamey, which had a population of about 1,800, became its capital. The capital was intended to be temporary, and its location was debated, so Niamey did not become a focus of development. Niamey's city limits were first drawn in 1905. As isolated rebellions continued against colonial rule, the garrison in Niamey quelled an attack in January 1906 by rebels from Karma and Boubon, led by the leader of Karma, Oumarou. The capital received reinforcements from other posts before the rebels could capture it. In 1908, the Canton of Niamey was replaced by the re-established Canton of Karma. Colonial officials were divided between supporting Zinder or Niamey as the capital, with supporters of Zinder arguing that its significance as a pre-colonial capital would strengthen political legitimacy. The capital moved back to Zinder in 1911, after violence in the eastern region had subsided and reorganisation had drawn Niamey further away from the center of the territory. From that year, Niamey's population began to decline from a peak of 3,000. During the First World War, the city's colonial infrastructure fell into disrepair. Niamey operated as a small stopping post for the military before being re-established as the capital.

=== Colony of Niger and development of capital ===
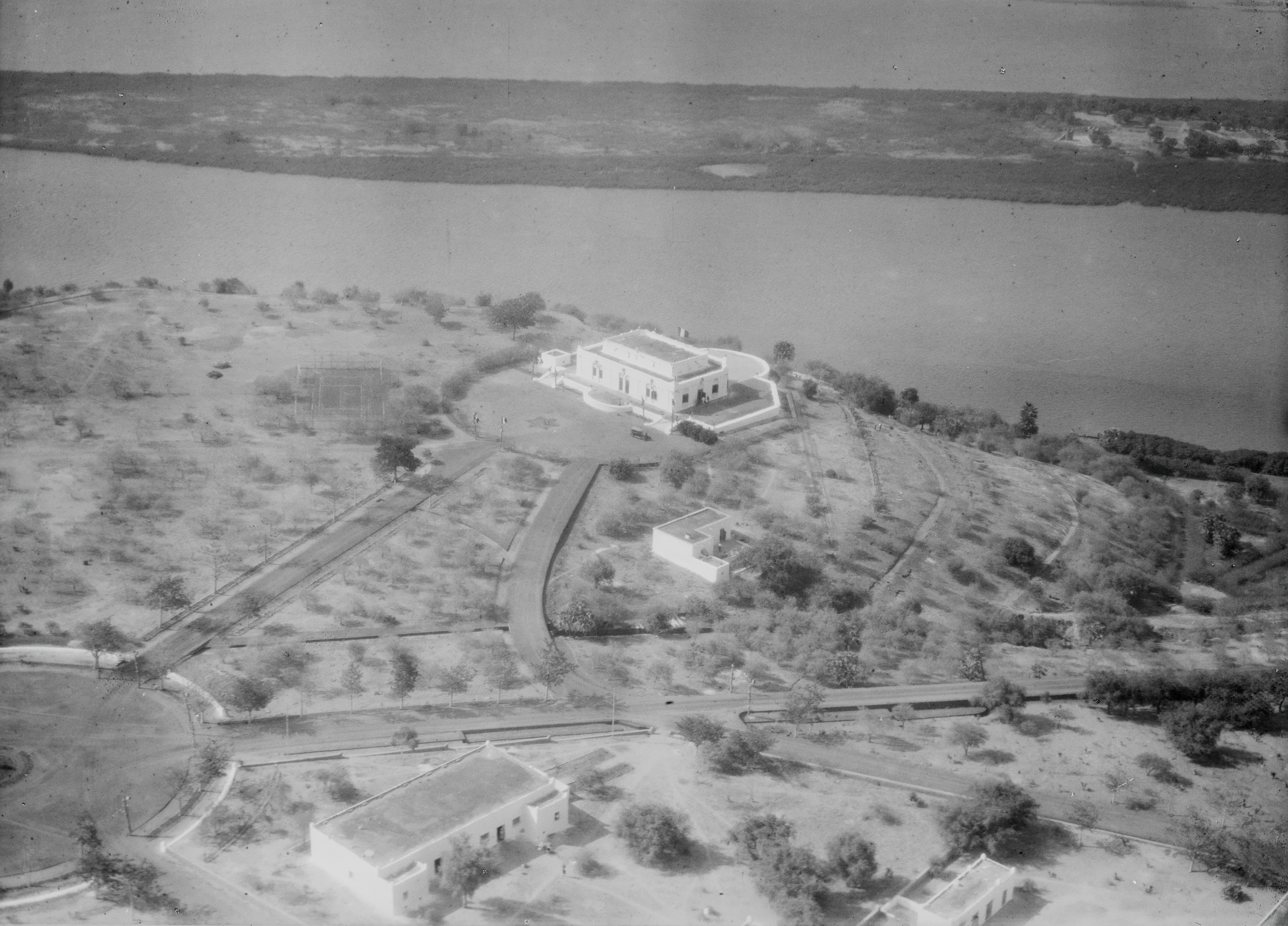
Niamey in 1930, aerial photograph by Walter Mittelholzer. The large building next to the river is the governor's palace.

The Colony of Niger was founded in 1922, with Jules Brévié as its governor. In 1925, one of the colony's seven military companies moved from Tanout to Niamey. The French chose to move the capital back to Niamey its distance to French-controlled ports, including Dakar, was lower than Zinder, which was closer to Kano, in the British territory of Nigeria. Although Niamey was isolated from most of the colony, it was chosen for its proximity to French Dahomey, its more comfortable climate, and its location on the Niger River valley, which officials believed was the only place suitable for commercial agriculture. The official reason for the move was that Zinder had insufficient potable water. Another major factor was that Niamey had no ruling ethnic group that could form a resistance to French rule, as the Hausa population of Zinder had done. Brévié made Niamey the capital on 28 December 1926, by which time the city had 3,142 inhabitants. Construction of the new capital began the year prior, mostly using forced labourers from neighbouring colonies. Niamey's first major administrative buildings were then built, including the governor's palace, a hospital, public housing, and the Petit Marché, the first market on the plateau of Niamey, which opened in 1929 as an incentive for people to move away from the riverbank.

In the decades following Niamey's establishment as the capital, the government largely ignored other parts of Niger in favor of the west. There was a failed proposal to split eastern Niger into the Territory of Zinder so investment could be concentrated in the Niamey region. The government prioritized developing agriculture and trade routes in this region, with a particular interest in cotton production. Government-led agricultural activities in the late 1920s were understaffed; the primary site was a government farm in Niamey, which tested farming crops, sheep, and ostriches. Revenue from commercial agriculture and taxation was invested in urban development. As capital, Niamey also became the center for the educated class of mostly Songhai and Zarma people. The first regional school opened in 1930, whose students could continue education at the École normale William Ponty, and the first primary school, Ecole Primaire Supérieure, opened in 1931. The government planned to extend Dahomey's Cotonou–Parakou railway to reach Niamey, rejecting a line from Kano to Zinder. This project, which used labourers sent as tribute, was not completed.

By 1930, Niamey had a city plan that designated an indigenous quarter near the river and a European quarter further inland, separated by a park called the zone sanitaire. Military barracks and the governor's palace were located near the indigenous quarter. In late 1930 and early 1931, government buildings were constructed and the governor's palace was completed; this involved about 1,000 men being assigned six-month jobs. Also in 1931, the French administration created the chieftaincy of Niamey, appointing Salaman's former servant as chief, but it was unrecognised by locals. The 1931 Niger famine occurred in the western part of the colony, including Niamey, after low rainfall and crop failure the previous year. In May 1931, the city began seeing an influx of displaced people. The administrator of Niamey began grain distributions, which served thousands of women and children daily. Finding it difficult to deter fraudulent applications for aid, the administration halted distributions and denied migrants. A case brought to the Human Rights League accused the administration in Niamey of criminal mismanagement during the famine. The wave of migrants increased the city's population tenfold, but most left after the famine ended. Those who remained established informal settlements with mostly thatched mud buildings on the edge of the indigenous quarter. The population increase led colonial administrators to increase policing of hygiene.

In the 1930s, planning of the capital focused on administrative necessities. Urban planning also began focusing on health initiatives such as clean water to prevent malaria. The health plan required the relocation of the original neighbourhoods, except for Gaweye, to the plateau. The administration gave free land to residents who relocated, but most wished to stay on the river bank. After a 1935 fire destroyed many straw buildings, residents were required to move to mudbrick houses. The land distributed by the administration resulted in multiethnic neighbourhoods. An urban plan implemented in 1937 divided the city into the European city, the indigenous city, and a commercial and industrial zone. The European city was designed as a garden city, as had been done in Dakar, with green spaces and roundabouts. After authorities determined that the city had too little groundwater for wells, a river-based water supply was built the same year. Water pipes were built by 1940, initially only serving European households, with standpipes installed in indigenous neighbourhoods. Most parts of the urban plan, including a greenbelt and a train station, were cancelled after colonial officials left for the Second World War, and the administration prioritised commercial farming over infrastructure. Niamey experienced another famine in 1940 during the Vichy France government.

As the city's population increased—from 5,000 in 1941 to 7,500 in 1945—colonial administrators were unable to enforce property ownership laws, resulting in many people acquiring land from indigenous chiefs. The administration used taxation and forced labour to disincentivise immigration to the city. This labour was used for public works in the 1940s, which included an airfield, a central hospital, and a maternity ward. Forced labour was permitted under the indigénat until its abolishment in 1946, after which rural immigration increased.

=== Overseas territory and first municipal elections ===
After Niger gained autonomy as an overseas territory in 1946, political parties began forming in Niamey. The city's administrator, Amirou Kallé, was fired for becoming part of the French Communist Party. To prevent political upheaval, the French government reorganised Niamey into districts subordinate to a French administrator; Gamkalé and Yantala were incorporated into the city. In the 1948 Niger by-election, 70% of the vote in Niamey went to the losing candidate, Djibo Bakary, a socialist who would gain popularity in following years among the urban proletariat of Niamey. A gendarmerie unit was established in Niamey, with another in Maradi, in 1954.

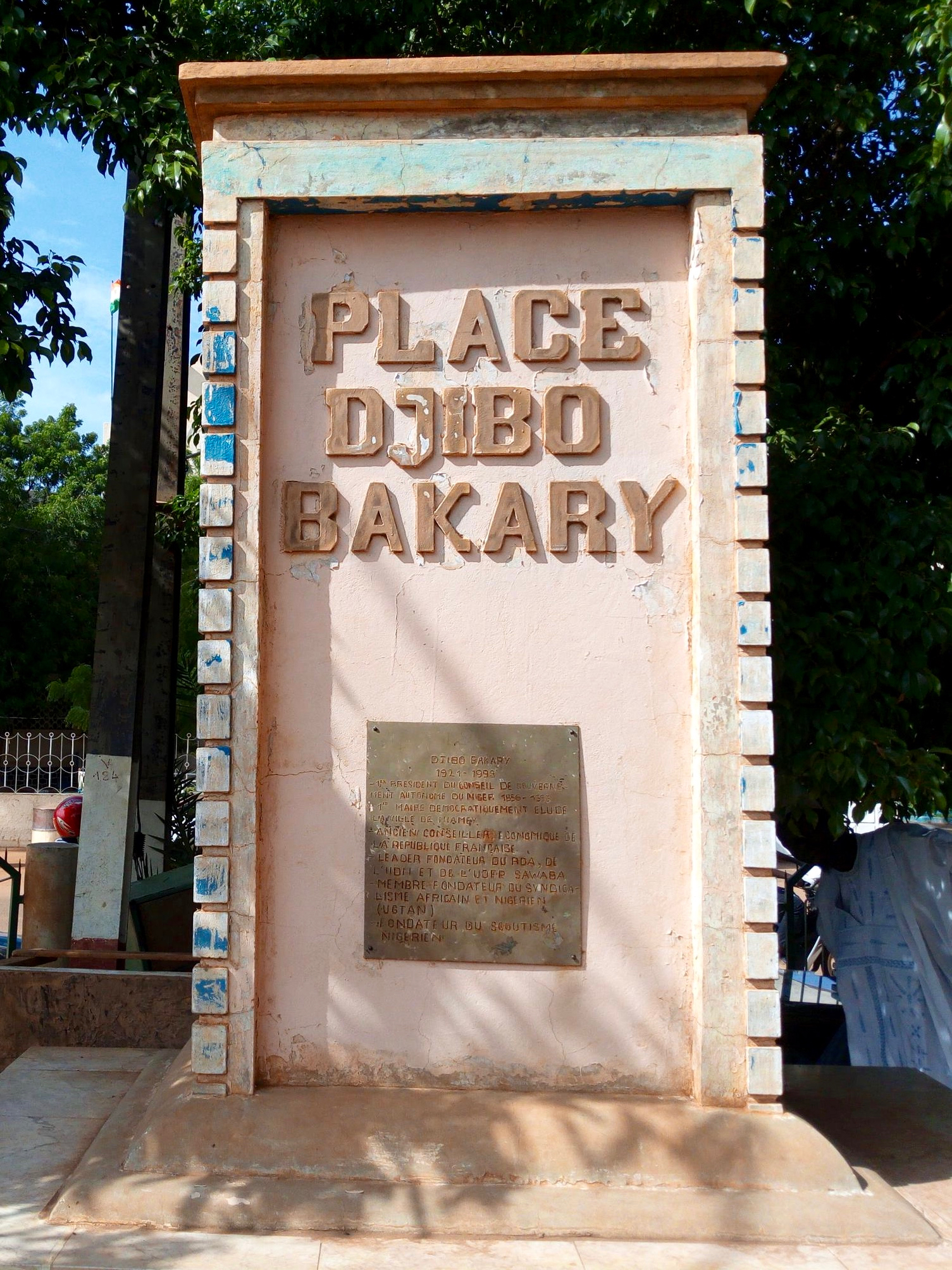
Plaque honouring Djibo Bakary, the first mayor of Niamey

The 1952 urban plan, the Plan Herbé (lit. 'Grassy Plan'), divided the city into several zones. The indigenous side included dense city blocks, while the European side was more open and green. This plan also formalised trade of land plots, replacing traditional land ownership with a marketplace. These plots were primarily purchased by civil servants, while traditional land plots continued to be sold. Gaining prominence from its status as capital, Niamey became the first urban centre in Niger by 1955, having doubled in size over the previous decade to about 15,000 people. By the end of the decade, the city's growth accelerated due to an easing of colonial limitations as well as a 1954 famine which drove rural immigrants to the city. The city grew inward into the zone sanitaire, eliminating the distinction between the European and indigenous cities by 1955, and racially integrated neighbourhoods received new labels such as Boukoki and Zongo. The Plan Herbé became outdated as many neighbourhoods arose. These included Terminus and Plateau in the European city; Gandatché, Koira Tégui, and Kabé Koira near the Niamey Grand Market; and Kalley Amirou, Kalley Est, and Balafon in the city centre.

Niamey was named as a commune mixte on 14 February 1954, and a partially elected council was formed with eight members and four alternates. The city was upgraded to Niger's only commune de plein exercice on 18 December 1955, leading to municipal elections on 18 November 1956, the first in the country. Around this time, the overwhelming majority of the city's workers joined the trade union established by Bakary, Société Coopérative ouvriére de consommation. In the municipal elections, the newly formed Mouvement Socialiste Africain coalition (later renamed Sawaba), won a majority, resulting in Bakary becoming the city's first mayor, with Boubou Hama as deputy mayor. Bakary ran for Niamey's seat in the Territorial Assembly in 1958 but lost to Adamou Mayaki. He also campaigned for independence in the 1958 referendum.

== Post-independence era ==
=== Independence, economic growth, and population boom ===
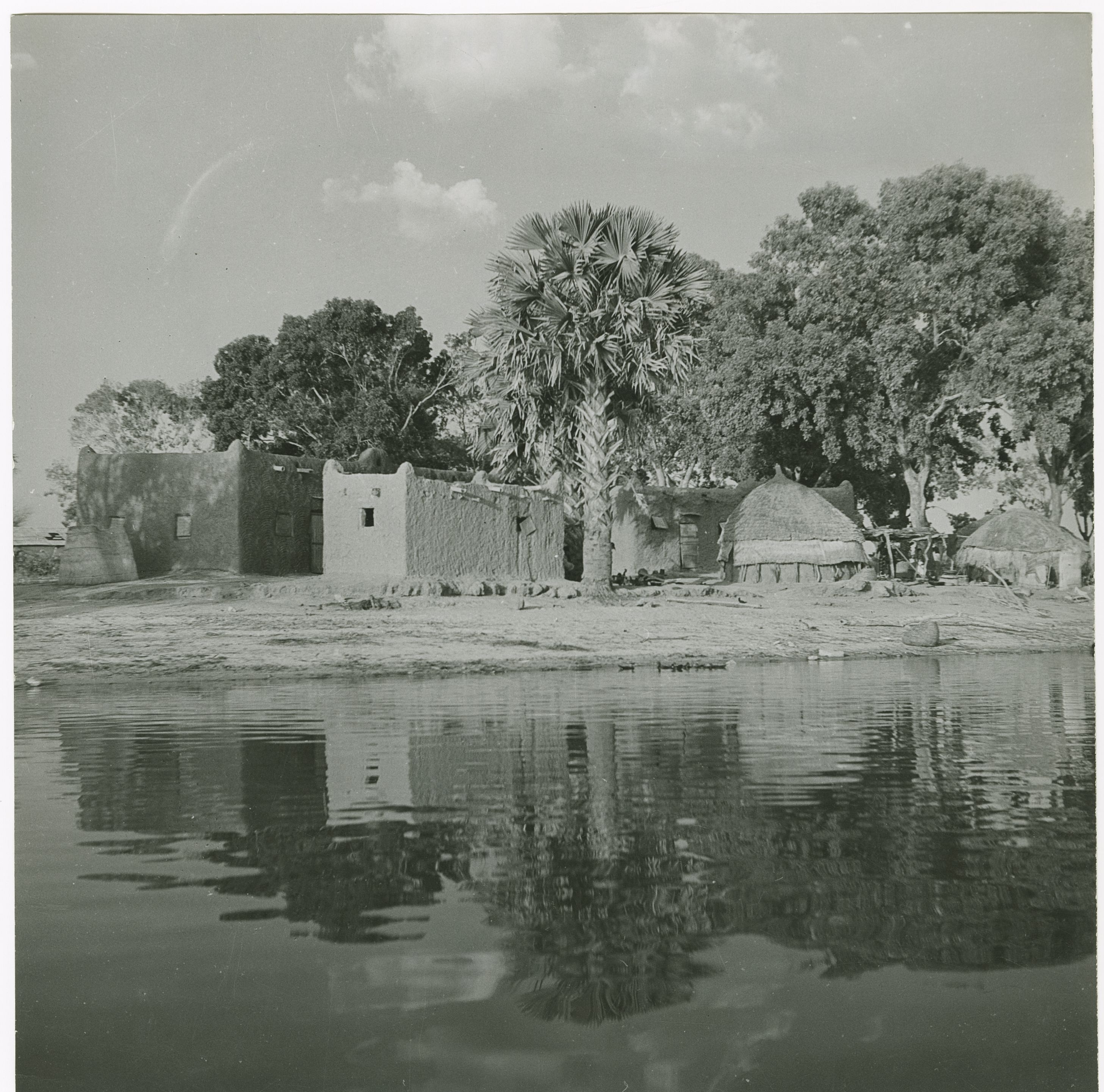
Niamey riverfront in 1961

The Declaration of Independence of Niger took place in Niamey on 3 August 1960. By this time, Niamey's population had grown to 33,816. The Commission Nationale de l’Urbanisme et de l’Habitat (National Commission on Urbanism and Habitat) was created in 1961 to deal with Niamey's development, and the French firm Kalt, Pouradier-Duteil, and Raymond drafted a new city plan later that year. This plan zoned the former indigenous quarter for five times the density of the former European quarter, zoning the latter for more permanent structures and a larger volume of planned developments. Niamey had only dirt roads at the time of independence. By 1963, it had the country's only asphalt highway, spanning a few kilometers between Niamey's airport and the Presidential Palace—the former governor's palace. Construction of the Our Lady of Perpetual Help Cathedral began in 1961.

On 1 August 1961, French military units were transferred to the Niger Armed Forces, including the one in Niamey, which became the 1re Compagnie de commandement, d’appui et de service (1re CCAS; transl. 1st Company of Command, Support, and Service). Niger established the Gendarmerie Nationale in 1962, but Niamey's gendarmerie unit remained under French control. The 1re CCAS, led by Captain Diallo Amadou Hassane, led a rebellion against the French units in the city on 3 December 1963. In the mid-1960s, public-sector employees in Niamey comprised a large part of Niger's workforce. The city also had nearly all of the French expatriates in Niger. Many diplomatic missions and international organisations began coming to Niamey. The government of Hamani Diori aimed to increase the country's industrial activities; Niamey received a textile production facility owned by Niger Textiles and a refrigerated slaughterhouse.

Niamey's groundnut industry rapidly grew in the 1960s, which contributed to growth, bringing the city's population to 108,000 in 1972. An urban plan enacted in 1964 or 1966 ended the distinction between European and indigenous neighbourhoods and aimed to lower the disparity within the city's population density. Despite this, housing insecurity increased, and the urban area's first informal settlement, Talladjé, was created in 1966 (gaining formal recognition in 1981). The urban plan also introduced a greenbelt managed by the country's Forest Service. The majority of foreign investment in Niamey came from the French Fonds d'Investissements pour le Développement Economique et Social, but developments under the urban plan were also funded by the United States, Libya, and the European Economic Community. This included the American-funded Kennedy Bridge, which opened in 1970. This bridge connected the left bank of Niamey to the much less populated right bank, which then began to urbanise.

Diori's government established a party militia in 1964, stationing personnel in each of the city's seventeen quartiers. Diori led the first summit of the Organisation de la Francophonie in 1969 in Niamey, giving the city unprecedented media coverage. After negative coverage from publications such as The New York Times, Diori launched a rebranding campaign for the city, which included promotion of events and naming of streets. Niamey was the epicenter of student-led anti-government protests starting in 1971. Diori's government held a conference with France and Gabon in March 1974 in Niamey, which led to tensions with France surrounding Niger's uranium exports. Seyni Kountché planned a military coup against Diori in a January 1974 meeting in Niamey. Kountché took power and installed the Supreme Military Council in April. The following month, the council made France close down its military operations in Niger.

A street in Niamey in 1972

After the start of commercial uranium mining in Niger in 1971, a boom in the industry improved the economy of Niamey through the 1980s. The city's public spending was then invested in modern buildings, resulting in an era of opulent architecture in a revival of the Sudanese style. The economic situation caused a baby boom, contributing to rapid growth of the city. Meanwhile, a drought in 1972–73 caused a wave of urbanisation that brought migrants to Niamey. This led to rapid urban sprawl and brought a wave of Malian immigrants to peripheral neighbourhoods of the city, whose populations doubled or tripled. Upon Kountché's ascension to power, he enacted food distribution plans to Niamey's perhiphery, which gained him popularity in the city.

Kountché's military government established a daily curfew and placed 10,000 political agents in the city, which had a population of 400,000. Niamey had two of the country's four high schools in the 1970s. The High School of Niamey and the High School Issa Korombé were the site of student strikes around this time. In response to student protests in 1976, the government shut down several educational institutions in Niamey, but the protests continued after the 1982 visit of French president François Mitterrand. Kountché also led the construction of the Grand Mosque of Niamey, funded by the Libyan government. In 1980, 14% of the city's workers were in the public sector.

A second drought occurred in 1983–84, bringing about 150,000 displaced people to Niamey; the population reached 399,846 in 1988. The city grew without an increase in available land; Kountché's government addressed this housing crisis through eviction and resettlement, which created districts including Lazaret and Madina. However, new plots were quickly occupied, and access to them was politicised. The government also constructed fifty water sources in the city's periphery, funded by the French government and planned by the French Bureau de Recherches Geologiques et Minieres. In 1984, the Schéma Directeur d’Aménagement et d’Urbanisme (transl. Master Plan for Urban Planning and Development) was created amid an urban planning movement in African capitals. This plan divided Niamey into five districts, subordinate to the Prefect Mayor, to manage the large population. These were reorganised into the Niamey Urban Community (Communauté Urbaine de Niamey, CUN), with three municipalities, in 1989. In the 1990s, with further reorganisation and decentralisation, the city's growth slightly declined to a rate below 5%, the lowest since the colonial era.

=== Democratisation era and urban reorganisation ===
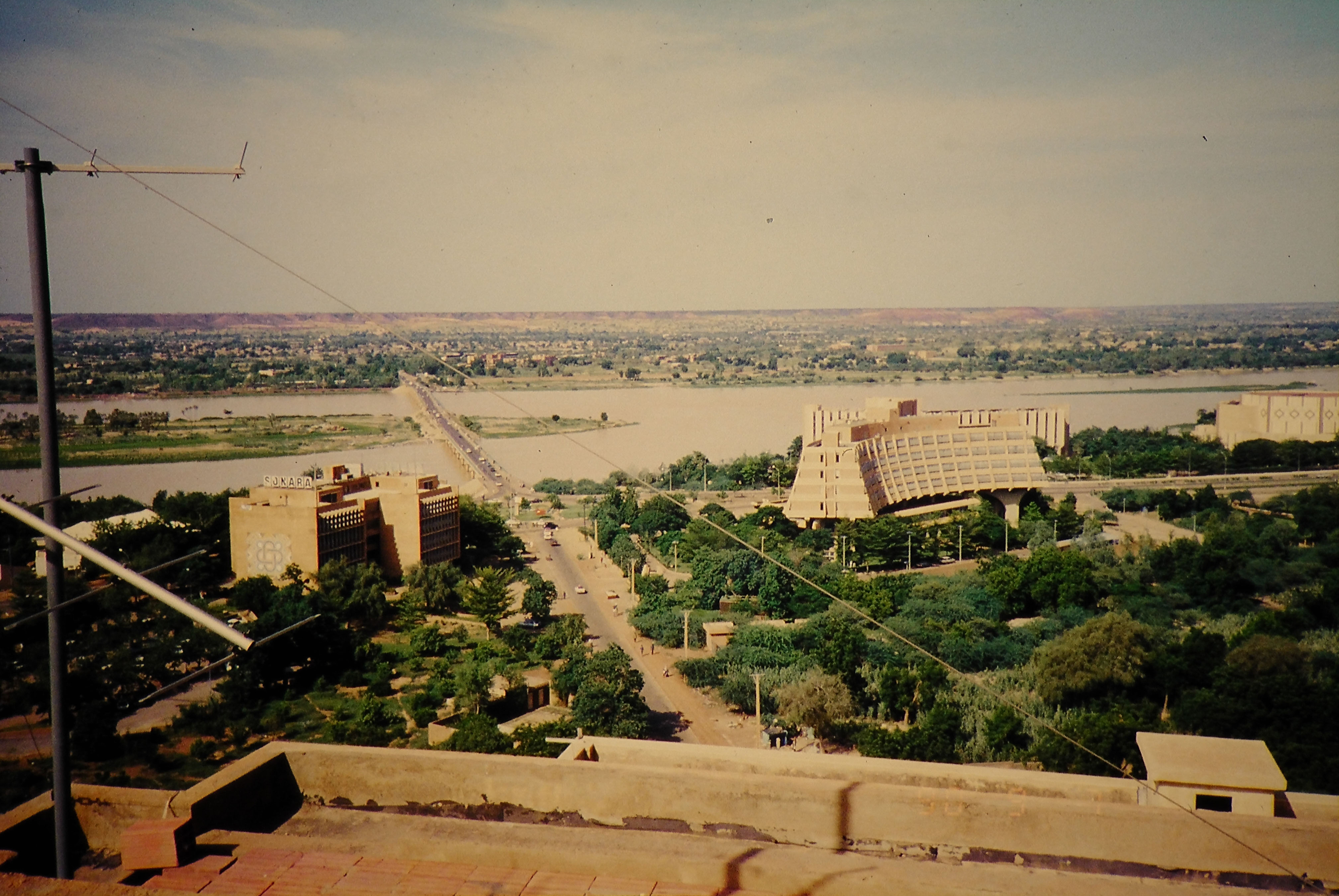
View from the left bank overlooking the Kennedy Bridge in 1990

Soldiers killed three student protesters during a march on Kennedy Bridge on 9 February 1990. This event, known as the Kennedy Bridge Massacre, propelled protests and political participation in Niamey that contributed to the country's democratisation. That November, 100,000 people in Niamey participated in a general strike against president Ali Saibou, after which he announced a democratic council. Upon Saibou's 1991 establishment of a transitional council, protestors in Niamey led a march against the lack of female representation; the council's sole female member, Haoua Alio, resigned in support of the protest. The demonstration on 13 May involved thousands of protestors in the capital before spreading to other cities; it was the largest feminist protest in Niger's history, a record that stands as of 2015.

The National Sovereign Conference was held in Niamey from 29 July to 2 November 1991 and established a transitional government led by André Salifou. Soldiers in Niamey held a mutiny in 1992, kidnapping Salifou. Government forces halted the mutiny. Mahamane Ousmane became the first democratically elected president in 1993 amid a declining economy. That year, 42% of Niamey's population was classified as poor by the national government, and the unemployment rate reached 20% as public-sector jobs decreased. As Niamey's population reached 500,000 by 1996, public services failed to meet demand, and opposition to the government became widespread. The devaluation of the CFA franc in 1994 also contributed to an economic crisis in Niamey, which continued through the 2010s.

Niger's democratisation effected an upsurge in the popularity of private radio and in Islamic discourse. Islamic activists protested a family planning campaign in Niamey in 1993. When Ousmane's government presented a drafted family law the following year, Islamic groups opposed to this law were largely based in Niamey, arguing that such matters should be regulated by religion rather than the state. A protest in the city against the family law resulted in one death and twenty-four injuries. Niamey's Islamic groups also protested the city's hosting of the second International Festival of African Fashion, which began in November 1999. About 1,500 activists assembled in front of the National Assembly building on the day before the festival began, and another protest occurred on the first day of the event in front of the Grand Mosque. As the festival continued, rioters blocked streets and attacked businesses and individuals, and protests spread to other cities. Though the festival was successful, the deadly violence of the protests prompted the event to leave Niger until 2003.

A coup d'état organized in Niamey in February 1996 installed Ibrahim Baré Maïnassara as president. Baré was unpopular in Niamey as public-sector employment decreased and state-run urban services declined. On April 9, 1999, Baré was ambushed, shot and killed during a coup d'état.

The CUN was reorganised in 1996 amid a wide reorganisation of the country's municipalities. The CUN became a first-level region of Niger, and it was divided into five municipalities, which remained subordinate to the Prefect Mayor. The plan allowed the region to become smaller to centralise the area managed. A 2002 plan instead gave each of the five municipalities a perimeter which they would be allowed to expand to benefit from urban growth. Municipal boundaries were drawn based on pre-colonial settlements, with consulting from traditional chiefs, as was happening across Niger. Administrative decentralisation in 2004 gave these municipalities control over zoning, leading to a dispute with the CUN. Residents of Saga disagreed with becoming part of the CUN without village status. In 2011, the municipalities were reorganised as municipal districts, undoing the decentralisation. Forty years after the Kennedy Bridge was built, the Chinese government funded the second bridge in Niamey in 2010, the Pont de l’amitié Chine-Niger.

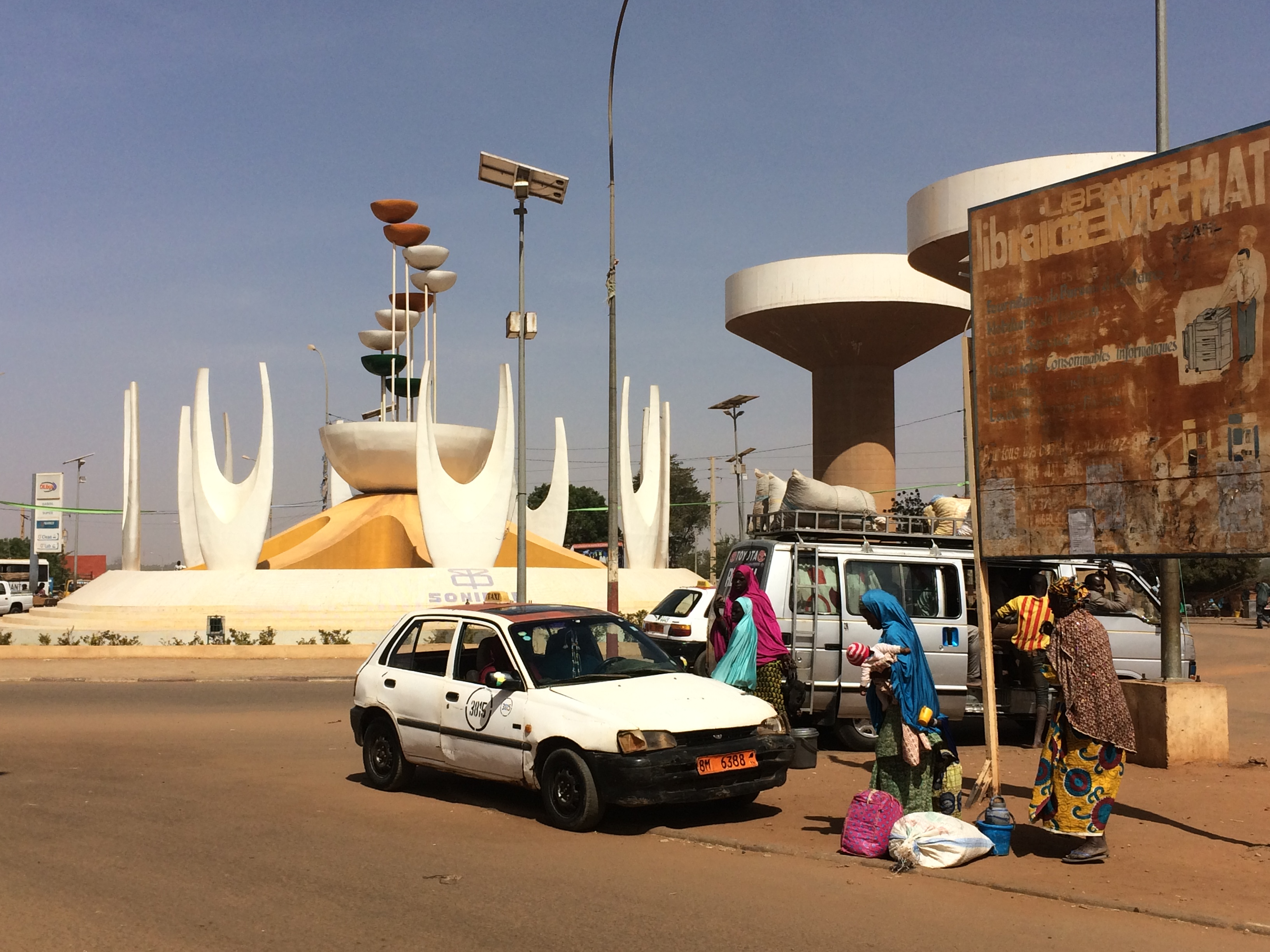
Place du Liptako-Gourma in 2018

In 2004, during the Mamadou Tandja administration, a protest dubbed La Lutte Contre la Vie Cher (lit. 'The War Against the Expensive Life') involved many businesses in Niamey ceasing operations for one day. Niamey held the 5th Jeux de la Francophonie in December 2005. Ahead of this event, Niamey received millions of dollars of funding for developments including the creation of the Village de la Francophonie. The city had widespread protests against Tandja during the 2009–2010 constitutional crisis that led to his overthrow.

After Mahamadou Issoufou became president in 2011, he began an urban renewal project called Niamey Nyala, with the stated goals of reducing traffic, beautification, renovation of the city centre and industrial zone, and cleanliness. The project focused on improving the city's appearance rather than services used by most residents. Ahead of the city's hosting of an African Union summit in 2019, the city planned construction including an airport expressway. Construction on this project and Niamey Nyala involved the expropriation and destruction of neighbourhoods.

A terrorist insurgency led by the Islamic State became active in the suburbs of Niamey in 2017, weakening government control. During the COVID-19 pandemic in Niger, Niamey entered a lockdown on 27 March 2020, which included a nightly curfew and a suspension of collective prayers. Youths in several neighbourhoods held protests against these measures, with some engaging in violence and vandalism. Niamey was the site of protests against the 2021 presidential election and president-elect Mohamed Bazoum; most Niameyans believed he had stolen the election as the city had overwhelmingly voted for Mahamane Ousmane. Air force units in the city led an attempted coup against Bazoum before his inauguration but were halted by the Presidential Guard, led by Abdourahamane Tiani.
