= Adamou Mayaki =

Nigerien politician (1919–2003)

Adamou Mayaki (June 1919 – summer 2003) was a Nigerien politician and diplomat. Mayaki was the Foreign Minister of Niger from 1963 to 1965, and a leading member of the ruling PPN-RDA party.

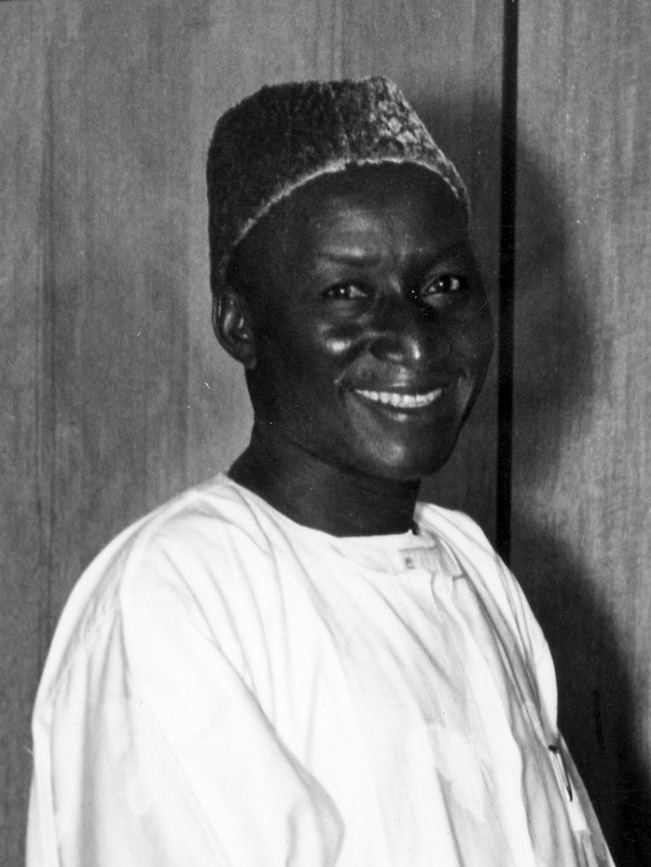
Adamou Mayaki in 1961

Mayaki was born in Filingué in June 1919. His family was of a royal Sudié line, a Hausa speaking subgroup which governed the town under French colonial rule. His grandfather was the first French appointed Chef du Canton of the area, and his father was Serkin of Filingué until 1935. Mayaki attended the French teachers college at Kati, Mali, became a civil engineer, and became active in politics in 1946 as a leader of the Nigerien Action Bloc (BNA), which later became the Union of Nigerien Independents and Sympathisers (UNIS), one of two pre-independence parties contesting the 1952 territorial elections. Mayaki was elected to the Nigerien Territorial Assembly in March 1952 from Maradi and was re-elected in 1956. From 1952 he also served on the Grand Council of French West Africa, and from 1953 as Niger colony's representative to the French Union and in 1958, after the UNIS split, was elected to the first Territorial National Assembly from the PPN-RDA-led Union for the Franco-African Community (UCFA). The UCFA was a front aligned with the PPN which proposed continued membership in the French Community, and opposed immediate independence proposed by the PPN's rival SAWABA party. The 1958 election deposed SAWABA (which some other UNIS members had joined) from the Assembly, and Mayaki became a prominent member of Hamani Diori's first semi-independent Nigerien government.

Mayaki had been the Territory's Minister of Agriculture from May 1957, and after the UCFA victory, he became Niger's first Minister of the Interior. In December 1958 he became Minister of Economics and Planning. After full independence in 1960, Mayaki became Minister of Commerce and Industry. In 1963 he took over from President Diori as the Foreign Minister of Niger.

SAWABA militants, after their party had been decreed illegal in 1959, launched a series of sabotage attacks and border raids in 1964 and 65. In response, the PPN moved a number of members who had at one time belonged to rival parties, Mayaki among them. He became Nigerien ambassador to the United States from 1965 to 1970, prefect of Dosso Region (then named "department"), and in 1973 president of the Nigerien state trucking company, the SNTN. When the First Republic was overthrown in the 1974 Nigerien coup d'état, Mayaki managed to retain a government post, and Secretary to the Nigerien Ministry of Finance. He retired in 1976.

Preceded by Hamani Diori	Foreign Minister of Niger; 1963–1965	Succeeded by Hamani Diori
