= Abdoulaye Hamani Diori =

Nigerien politician (1945 – 2011)

Abdoulaye Diori Hamani (29 December 1945 – 25 April 2011) was a Nigerien political leader and businessman. The son of Niger's first President, he waged a political and abortive military struggle against the Military regime that overthrew his father. With the return of democracy to Niger, Abdoulaye became head of his father's political party, and maintained a small but influential place in the political life of Niger until his death in 2011. Abdoulaye was married with four children: Ibrahim, Abdel Karim, Aboukar, Souleymane. A Muslim, he earned the honorific 'Hadji' after making the pilgrimage to Mecca. He died 25 April 2011 at National Hospital in Niamey, aged 65, following an illness.

== Opposition and exile ==
Abdoulaye was the eldest son of Niger's first President, Hamani Diori, and campaigned from exile on his father's behalf following the 1974 coup which removed Diori from power and resulted in the death of his. In the 1980s, following his father's 1980 release from prison and house arrest in 1984. According to chief of state Seyni Kountche, Abdoulaye became political leader of a short-lived armed rebel group, the Popular Front for the Liberation of Niger (Front populaire de libération du Niger, FPLN). The FPLN, made up mostly of Nigerien Tuareg fighters and based in Libya, carried out an armed assault on an armory in the northern town of Tchintabaradene in March 1985, but was repulsed by government forces. Following the attack, Abdoulaye's father was re-imprisoned to be released only upon the death of Niger's military leader in 1987. Following the death of Seyni Kountche, Abdoulaye returned from Côte d'Ivoire, joining his father and their former political rival Sawaba leader Djibo Bakary in meeting with new President Ali Saibou, announcing an amnesty and a series of reforms.

== Political leader ==
Abdoulaye returned to politics when military rule finally ended in 1991 as Niamey chapter leader of his father's former party, the PPN-RDA. He quickly rose to become the party's vice president, and succeeded Professor Dan Dicko Koulodo as elected president of the PPN-RDA following the former's death. Under his leadership, the PPN-RDA worked in coalitions with larger groupings. In 1995 Abdoulaye was elected to the National Assembly of Niger, working in coalition with then Prime Minister of Niger Mahamadou Issoufou. Diori was chosen as Vice President of the Assembly at that time. In 2004 he returned as minister to the National Assembly, and was elected President of the Defense Commission of the National Assembly for the 2004-2008 session. Like his father, Abdoulaye Hamani Diori stood for elections representing constituencies in Dogondoutchi Department, Dosso Region, centered around his mother's native town of Togone and his father's native town of Soudouré, Dosso Region (which is now part of the Niamey Capital District). He was also involved in a number of private enterprises, including the charter airline Air Niamey. Abdoulaye opposed the failed attempt by former President Mamadou Tandja to extend his term under a new constitution in 2009, and supported the 18 February 2010 coup to depose Tandja, saying "The government created the environment for the coup to take place". He supported Mahamadou Issoufou in his successful bid to become the first President of the Nigerien 7th Republic in 2011. He was appointed government Minister as Special Councilor to the President on 7 April 2011, and attended the 6 April inauguration of the President. Abdoulaye Hamani Diori died in Niamey at age 65 on 25 April 2011 following an illness. He was survived by his wife and four children Abdoulaye Hamani Diori was interred on 26 April 2011 next to his father in Soudouré following a funeral cortege overseen by the President, Prime Minister, President of the National Assembly, and other Nigerien political leaders.
