= Union for the Franco-African Community =

The Union for the Franco-African Community (French: Union pour la communauté franco-africaine, UCFA) was a political alliance in Niger.

== History ==
The alliance was formed by the Nigerien Progressive Party (PPN) and the African Regroupment Party (PRA) in 1958, shortly before the referendum on the French constitution, and was headed by the PPN's Hamani Diori. The PPN had finished second in the 1957 elections, winning 19 of the 60 seats (Sawaba had won the other 41), whilst the PRA had been founded earlier in 1958.

The December 1958 elections saw the alliance win 49 of the 60 seats. The results in Tessaoua and Zinder (where Sawaba had won its 11 seats) were later annulled due to irregularities, with the Tessaoua seats awarded to the UCFA, and a by-election scheduled for Zinder. However, ballot papers were only printed for the PPN, and due to fears of violence, Sawaba did not put up candidates, calling for a boycott instead. As a result, the UCFA gained control of all 60 seats.

Following independence the country became a one-party state under the PPN with Diori as president.
