= Nigerien Action Bloc =

The Nigerien Action Bloc (French: Bloc nigérien d'action, BNA) was a political party in Niger in 1955 and 1956 led by Issoufou Saidou Djermakoye, a traditional chief and former chairman of the Nigerien Progressive Party (PPN).

== History ==
The party emerged from a split in the Union of Nigerien Independents and Sympathisers (UNIS) in 1955 following an attempt by some UNIS leaders to affiliate the party with the Indépendants d'Outre Mer group in the French parliament. As a result, the majority of the party's members left to form the BNA. The new party affiliated with the Democratic and Socialist Union of the Resistance (UDSR) in Metropolitan France. The symbol of the party was a horse, and its official colour was yellow.

A joint list of BNA and the Nigerien Progressive Union (UPN) of Georges Condat received around 126,000 votes in the January 1956 French parliamentary elections. The list was the most voted-for, finishing in first place in seven provinces, and UPN leader Condat won one of the two seats in the French National Assembly. The UPN later merged into BNA. Following the merger Issoufou Saïdou served as the chairman of BNA, Condat and Sido Yacouba as vice chairmen, Tiémoko Coulibaly as general secretary and Adamou Mayaki as joint secretary.

BNA won four seats in the Niamey municipal polls of November 18, 1956, finishing in third place behind PPN-RDA and the Nigerien Democratic Union (UDN) of Djibo Bakary. With the support of the four BNA councillors, the UDN was able to claim the mayoralty. In Zinder the party finished in second place with nine seats. With the support of the UDN, BNA won the mayoral post in Zinder.

The following day, on November 19, 1956, the BNA merged with the UDN, forming what would soon become the Nigerien branch of the African Socialist Movement (MSA). However, the former (politically moderate) BNA and (politically radical) UDN members would constitute antagonistic factions in the MSA. In 1957 a group of former BNA members revolted against the MSA leadership. Likewise several former BNA leaders supported the 'Yes' vote in the 1958 French constitutional referendum in contrast to Bakary's opposition.

== Bibliography ==
- Finn Fuglestad, UNIS and BNA: The Rôle of 'Traditionalist' Parties in Niger, 1948-60, The Journal of African History, Vol. 16, No. 1 (1975), pp. 113–135, Cambridge University Press
