= 1957 Nigerien Territorial Assembly election =

- 31 March 1957
- All 60 seats in the Territorial Assembly; 31 seats needed for a majority
- Turnout: 28.68%
Party	Leader	Vote %	Seats	+/–
Sawaba	Djibo Bakary	64.52	41	New
PPN–RDA	Hamani Diori	29.96	19	+19
This lists parties that won seats. See the complete results below.

Territorial Assembly elections were held in Niger on 31 March 1957. The result was a victory for the Sawaba party, which won 41 of the 60 seats.

== Results ==
Party	Votes	%	Seats
Sawaba	222,958	64.52	41
Nigerien Progressive Party – African Democratic Rally	103,518	29.96	19
Nigerien Democratic Front	1,871	0.54	0
Others	17,212	4.98	0
Total	345,559	100.00	60
Valid votes	345,559	97.56	
Invalid/blank votes	8,630	2.44	
Total votes	354,189	100.00	
Registered voters/turnout	1,234,906	28.68	
Source: Sternberger et al.
