= Aissa Diori =

Nigerien politician

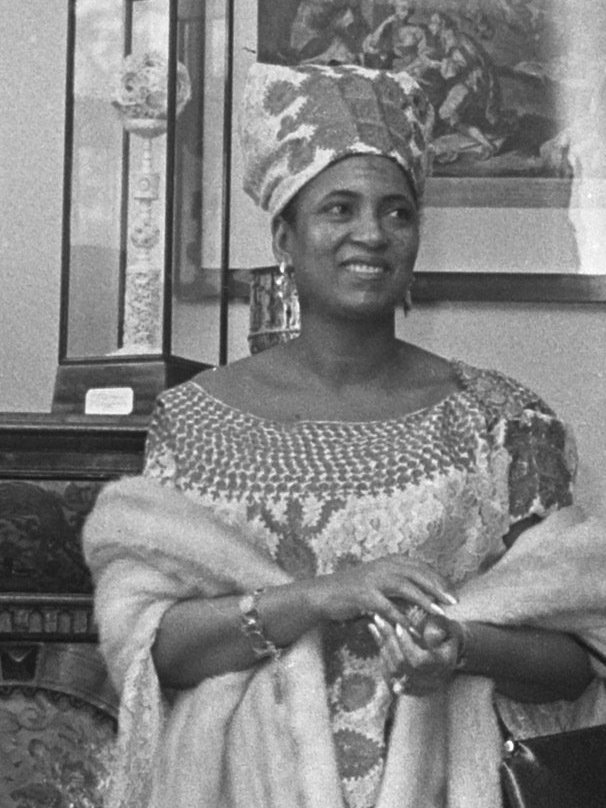
- Diori in 1968

1st First Lady of Niger
- In office 10 November 1960 – 15 April 1974
- President: Hamani Diori
- Preceded by: Position created
- Succeeded by: Mintou Kountché

Personal details
- Born: 1928 Dogondoutchi, Niger, French West Africa
- Died: 15 April 1974 (aged 45–46) Niamey, Niger
- Party: PPN-RDA
- Spouse: Hamani Diori

Aissa Diori also known as Aïchatou Diori (1928 – 15 April 1974) was the wife of President of Niger Hamani Diori and the inaugural First Lady of Niger from independence in 1960 until her death in 1974. She amassed a large wealth through corruption, including high-priced real estate. She was killed in the 1974 Nigerien coup d'état.

== Biography ==
Aissa Diori was born in Dogondoutchi in 1928. She came from the Foulani ethnic group. She married the teacher Hamani Diori on 9 May 1945. The couple had six children, including Abdoulaye Hamani Diori who later became a politician and businessman. Aissa Diori was a patron of the Union des Femmes du Niger (UFN) and had several artists, such as Bouli Kakasi, sing her praises. The UNF was founded on 6 October 1958. Under her leadership, the Union emphasized the participation of women in community projects, education, and job creation. It formed a network of women's organizations but was not able to influence legislation protecting women as wives and mothers. The First Lady and her UFN, however, anchored the presence of women-specific concerns to the public, to which later feminist endeavours for political participation from the 1990s onwards took their root.

Diori became First Lady of Niger on 3 August 1960 when her husband was inaugurated as President. In international geopolitics, Aïssa Diori was part of almost all the official travels of the President. In the United States, she did not hesitate to lend her support to black school children that were victims of racial discrimination. While in Niger, she was concerned with the education of nomadic children, as she was not educated. She filled the role of Minister of Promotion of Women.

Diori had amassed a considerable fortune through corruption. Diori owned many luxury houses in Niamey which she rented to foreign embassies and corporate executives at very high rates. She had also obtained a large amount of fertile land on the Niger River near Niamey. Many other members of the Nigerien Progressive Party-African Democratic Rally elite were also profiteering, but not as much as Aissa Diori. As a result, she was called the Austrian (referring to the French queen Marie Antoinette) by radical students, who reviled her.

She was shot and killed in the 1974 Nigerien coup d'état on 15 April 1974 by Sergeant Niandou Hamidou. Her Tuareg guards also died in the coup, the only casualties in a largely bloodless affair that led to the dissolution of her husband's government. Succeeding her as First Lady was Mintou Kountche, who also acquired a reputation for greed and corruption.
