= November 1946 French legislative election in Niger =

Elections to the French National Assembly were held in Niger on 10 November 1946 as part of the wider French elections. Previously Niger had formed a single constituency with neighbouring French Sudan, but the new 1946 constitution had separated the two territories, giving Niger one seat in the Assembly. It was won by Hamani Diori of the Nigerien Progressive Party – African Democratic Rally, who received 32% of the vote.

== Results ==
Candidate	Party	Votes	%
Hamani Diori	Nigerien Progressive Party	8,250	31.95
François Borrey	Independent Socialist	7,213	27.94
Saidou Issoufou	Independent	5,141	19.91
Roland Gougis	Independent	4,729	18.32
Djibrilla Maiga Mohamadou	Independent	486	1.88
Total		25,819	100.00
Valid votes		25,819	98.70
Invalid/blank votes		340	1.30
Total votes		26,159	100.00
Registered voters/turnout		57,276	45.67
Source: Sternberger et al.
