= Sani Souna Sido =

Nigerien soldier and politician (1933–1977)

Vice President of Niger
- In office 1974 – 2 August 1975
- President: Seyni Kountché

Personal details
- Born: 1933
- Died: June 1977 (aged 43–44) Agadez

Major Sani Souna Sido (1933–1977) was a Nigerien soldier and politician, and former Vice President of Niger.

Sido was a member of the cabinet of Hamani Diori before the 1974 coup d'état. He was reportedly popular among Nigerien Army troops. After the coup d'état Sido was appointed in to the ruling Supreme Military Council (Conseil Militaire Supréme), and appointed its Vice President and also minister of interior, mines, and geology in the cabinet of Seyni Kountché.

Friction and competition between Kountché and Sido grew, and by the end of 1974, Sido was stripped of his other military duties and demoted from the ministry of interior to directorship of the newly created Council of National Development. He was accused on 2 August 1975 of plotting against Kountché, and was arrested.

Sido died in Agadez in June 1977. He reportedly died of epilepsy, however, it was later exposed that he was executed under instruction from the préfet of the Agadez Region.
