= 1946–47 Nigerien General Council election =

- 15 December 1946
- All 30 seats in the General Council; 16 seats needed for a majority
- Turnout: 36.61%
Party	Leader	Seats	+/–
Independents	–	30	New
This lists parties that won seats. See the complete results below.

General Council elections were held in Niger on 15 December 1946, with a second round of voting on 5 January 1947. The General Council had been established by decree on 25 October 1946.

== Electoral system ==
The 30 seats in the General Council were elected using two colleges. The first college was restricted to French citizens and elected ten members from two constituencies. The second college was for Africans, and elected twenty members from nine constituencies, which were based on the regions, which included Fada N'Gourma and Dori, both of which were transferred to Upper Volta in September 1947.

== Campaign ==
The campaign for the elections was based primarily on the clientele of local leaders rather than political parties or manifestos.

== Results ==
Party	First round			Second round			Total seats
Party	Votes	%	Seats	Votes	%	Seats	Total seats
First College
Total	377	100	4			6	10
Registered voters/turnout	672	56.1	–			–	–
Second College
Total	20,309	100	10			10	20
Registered voters/turnout	55,835	36.3	–			–	–
Source: De Benoist

== Aftermath ==
Following the elections, Moumouni Aouta was elected as the Council's first President. On 6 February 1952 the Council was converted into the Territorial Assembly, and fresh elections were held in March.
