= 1987 Nigerien National Charter referendum =

- 16 June 1987

Results
Choice	Votes	%
Yes	3,241,589	99.58%
No	13,734	0.42%
Valid votes	3,255,323	99.79%
Invalid or blank votes	6,991	0.21%
Total votes	3,262,314	100.00%
Registered voters/turnout	3,370,000	96.8%

A referendum on the National Charter was held in Niger on 16 June 1987. In the first national vote since the military coup in 1974, voters were asked whether they approved of the Charter, which would establish non-elective, consultative institutions at both national and local levels. It was approved by 99.58% of voters with a 96.8% turnout.

== Results ==
Choice	Votes	%
For	3,241,589	99.58
Against	13,734	0.42
Invalid/blank votes	6,991	–
Total	3,262,314	100
Registered voters/turnout	3,370,000	96.83
Source: Direct Democracy
