= 1970 Nigerien presidential election =

- 1 October 1970
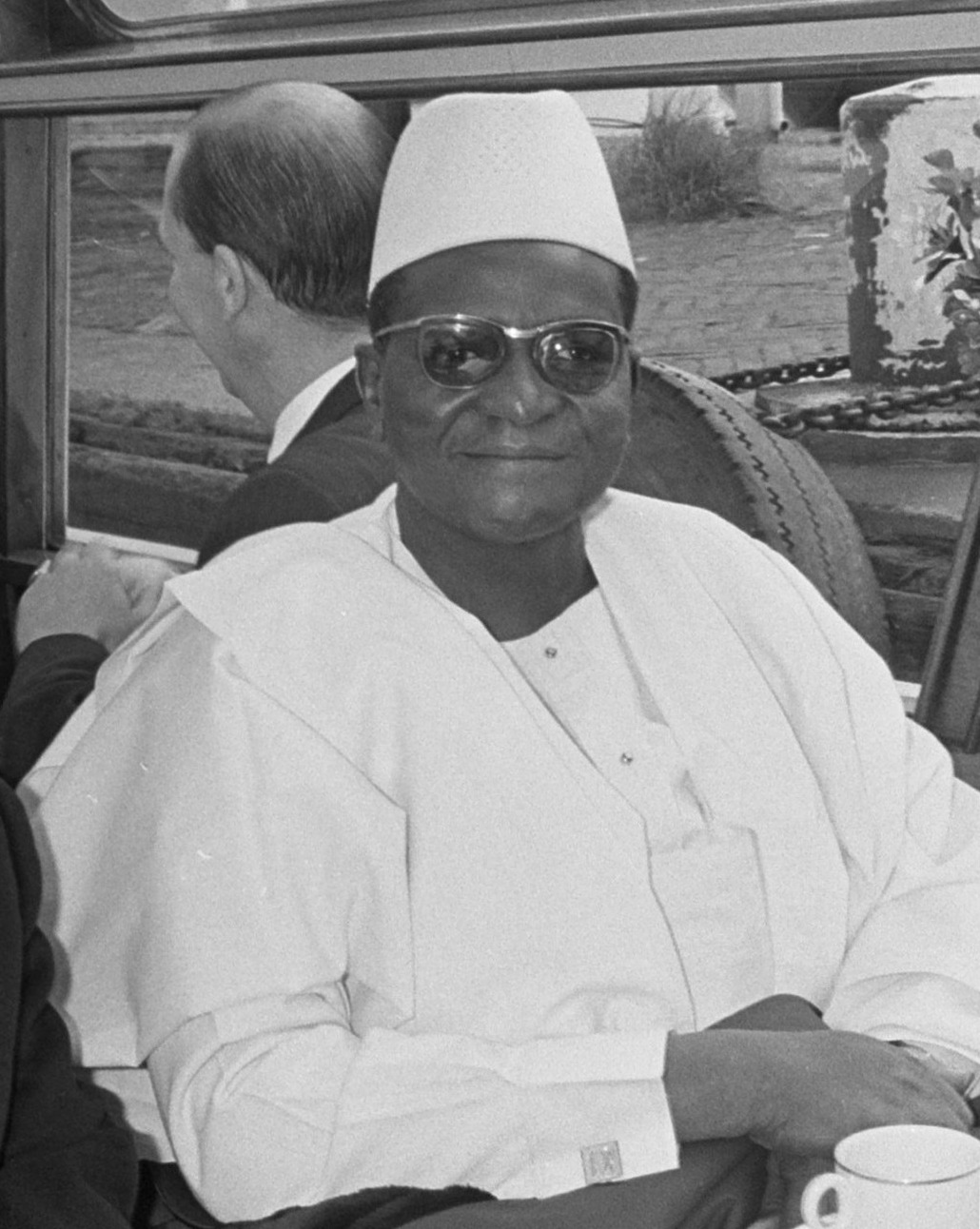
Nominee	Hamani Diori
Party	PPN–RDA
Popular vote	1,907,673
Percentage	100%
President before election
Hamani Diori
PPN–RDA
Elected President
Hamani Diori
PPN–RDA

Presidential elections were held in Niger on 1 October 1970. The country was a one-party state at the time, with the Nigerien Progressive Party – African Democratic Rally as the sole legal party. Its leader, incumbent president Hamani Diori, was the only candidate, and was re-elected unopposed. Voter turnout was reported to be 98.3%.

== Results ==
Candidate	Party	Votes	%
Hamani Diori	Nigerien Progressive Party – African Democratic Rally	1,907,673	100.00
Total		1,907,673	100.00
Valid votes		1,907,673	99.85
Invalid/blank votes		2,953	0.15
Total votes		1,910,626	100.00
Registered voters/turnout		1,942,774	98.35
Source: Sternberger et al.
