= 1965 Nigerien parliamentary election =

- 21 October 1965
- All 50 seats in the National Assembly; 26 seats needed for a majority
- Turnout: 98.28%
Party	Leader	Vote %	Seats	+/–
PPN–RDA	Hamani Diori	100	50	+1
This lists parties that won seats. See the complete results below.

Parliamentary elections were held in Niger on 21 October 1965. The country was a one-party state at the time, and voters were presented with a single list from the Nigerien Progressive Party – African Democratic Rally. According to official figures, 98.2% of eligible voters cast votes, and the PPN list won all 50 seats in the National Assembly.

== Results ==
Party	Votes	%	Seats	+/–
Nigerien Progressive Party – African Democratic Rally	1,677,763	100.00	50	+1
Total	1,677,763	100.00	50	−10
Valid votes	1,677,763	99.91		
Invalid/blank votes	1,433	0.09		
Total votes	1,679,196	100.00		
Registered voters/turnout	1,708,605	98.28		
Source: Nohlen et al.
