= 1948 Niger by-election =

- 27 June 1948
	First party	Second party
Candidate	Georges Mahaman Condat	Djibo Bakary
Party	UNIS	Progressive
Popular vote	15,219	5,375
Percentage	71.74%	25.34%

A by-election was held in the Niger constituency of the French National Assembly on 27 June 1948, after the territory was given a second seat in the Assembly. The result was a victory for Georges Mahaman Condat of the Union of Nigerien Independents and Sympathisers.

== Results ==
Candidate	Party	Votes	%
Georges Mahaman Condat	Union of Nigerien Independents and Sympathisers	15,219	71.74
Djibo Bakary	Nigerien Progressive Party	5,375	25.34
Ferron		396	1.87
Petit		225	1.06
Total		21,215	100.00
Source: Sternberger et al.
