= 1965 Nigerien presidential election =

- 30 September 1965
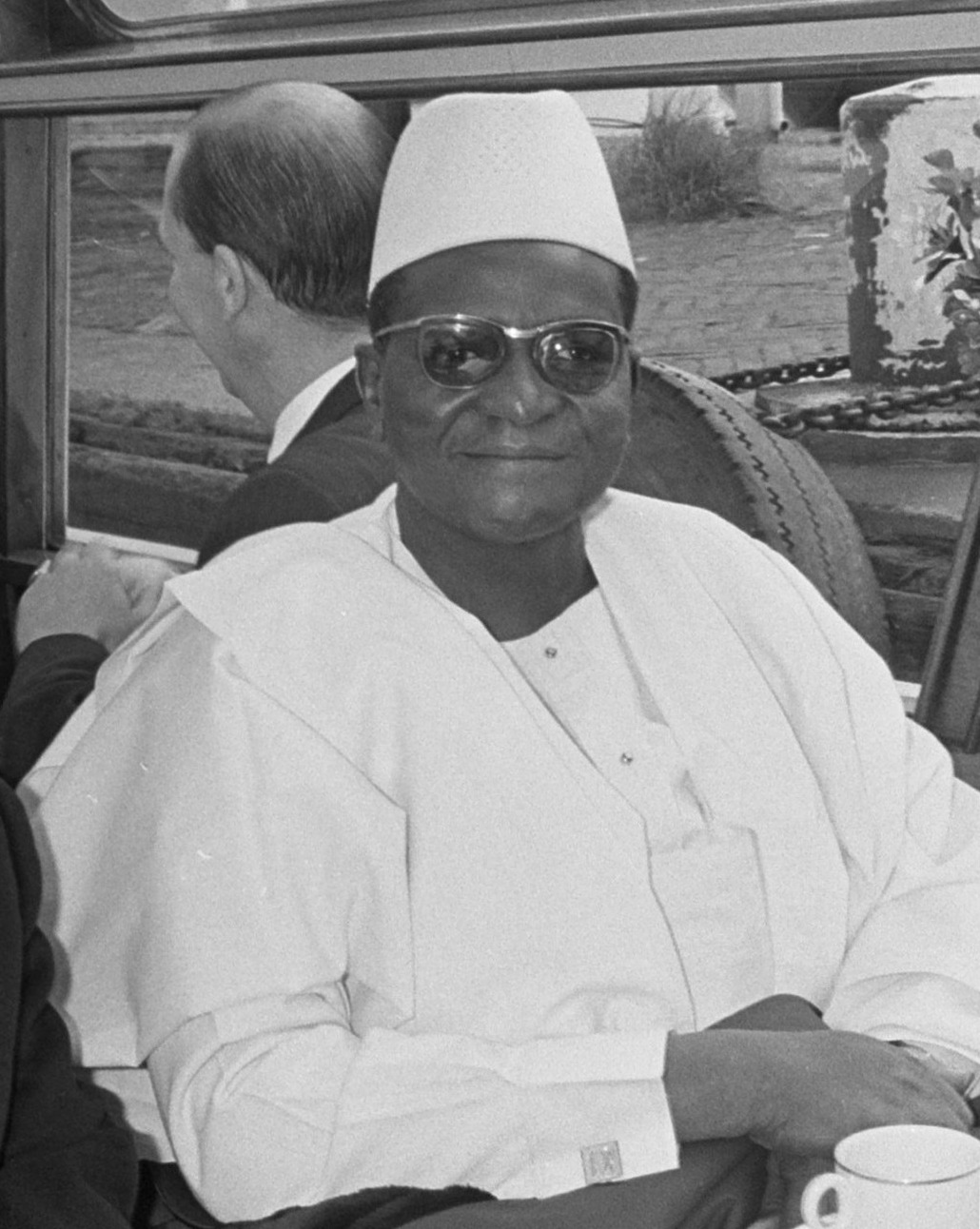
| Nominee | Hamani Diori |
| Party | PPN–RDA |
| Popular vote | 1,678,912 |
| Percentage | 100% |
President before election
Hamani Diori
PPN–RDA
Elected President
Hamani Diori
PPN–RDA

Presidential elections were held for the first time in Niger on 30 September 1965. The country had been declared a one-party state shortly after independence in 1960, with the Nigerien Progressive Party – African Democratic Rally becoming the sole legal party. Its leader, incumbent president Hamani Diori, was the only candidate, and was re-elected unopposed. Voter turnout was reported to be 98.4%.

== Results ==
| Candidate | Party | Votes | % |
|---|---|---|---|
| Hamani Diori | Nigerien Progressive Party – African Democratic Rally | 1,678,912 | 100.00 |
| Total | | 1,678,912 | 100.00 |
| Valid votes | | 1,678,912 | 99.90 |
| Invalid/blank votes | | 1,658 | 0.10 |
| Total votes | | 1,680,570 | 100.00 |
| Registered voters/turnout | | 1,707,044 | 98.45 |
Source: Sternberger et al.
