= 1970 Nigerien parliamentary election =

- 22 October 1970
- All 50 seats in the National Assembly; 26 seats needed for a majority
- Turnout: 97.11%
| Party | Leader | Vote % | Seats | +/– |
|---|---|---|---|---|
| PPN–RDA | Hamani Diori | 100 | 50 | 0 |
This lists parties that won seats. See the complete results below.
| President before | President after |
|---|---|
| Hamani Diori; PPN–RDA | Hamani Diori; PPN–RDA |

Parliamentary elections were held in Niger on 22 October 1970. The country was a one-party state at the time, with the Nigerien Progressive Party – African Democratic Rally as the sole legal party. It therefore won all 50 seats in the National Assembly. Voter turnout was reported at 97.1%.

== Results ==
| Party | Votes | % | Seats | +/– |
|---|---|---|---|---|
| Nigerien Progressive Party – African Democratic Rally | 1,850,968 | 100.00 | 50 | 0 |
| Total | 1,850,968 | 100.00 | 50 | 0 |
| Valid votes | 1,850,968 | 99.99 | | |
| Invalid/blank votes | 178 | 0.01 | | |
| Total votes | 1,851,146 | 100.00 | | |
| Registered voters/turnout | 1,906,283 | 97.11 | | |
Source: Nohlen et al.
