= 1958 Nigerien Territorial Assembly election =

- 14 December 1958
- All 60 seats in the Territorial Assembly; 31 seats needed for a majority
- Turnout: 36.66%
Party	Leader	Seats	+/–
PPN–RDA	Hamani Diori	49	+30
Sawaba	Djibo Bakary	11	−30
This lists parties that won seats. See the complete results below.

Territorial Assembly elections were held in Niger on 14 December 1958. The result was a victory for the Union for the Franco-African Community (an alliance of the Nigerien Progressive Party – African Democratic Rally and the African Regroupment Party), which won 49 of the 60 seats.

On 18 December 1958, the Territorial Assembly convened and proclaimed itself a Constituent Assembly.

The election was organized shortly after a constitutional referendum was held. During the referendum, the colonial authorities had largely marginalized anti-French oppositionist Djibo Bakary and his Sawaba through a massive campaign in favor of the "yes" vote (approving Charles de Gaulle's proposed constitution), coupled with interference by death squads under general Raoul Salan. This had led to a victory for the "yes" camp. The Territorial Assembly election took place in the context of France's campaign to push Bakary further out of power. The latter was to be replaced with his cousin Hamani Diori, whose power would be consolidated through the election. Similarly to the referendum, it was marked by a campaign of repression against opponents.

== Results ==
Party	Votes	%	Seats	+/–
Union for the Franco-African Community			49	+30
Sawaba			11	–30
Total			60	0
Valid votes	474,778	98.10		
Invalid/blank votes	9,175	1.90		
Total votes	483,953	100.00		
Registered voters/turnout	1,320,174	36.66		
Source: African Elections Database

== Aftermath ==
Following the elections, the results in the Tessaoua and Zinder constituencies, where Sawaba had won all their seats, were annulled due to irregularities. The Tessaoua seats were awarded to the UCFA, whilst a by-election was scheduled for Zinder on 27 June 1959. Ballot papers were only printed for the PPN-RDA, and due to fears of violence, Sawaba did not put up candidates, calling for a boycott instead. Following the by-elections, the UCFA controlled all 60 seats.
