= Seyni Kountché =

Military leader of Niger from 1974 to 1987

General Seyni Kountché
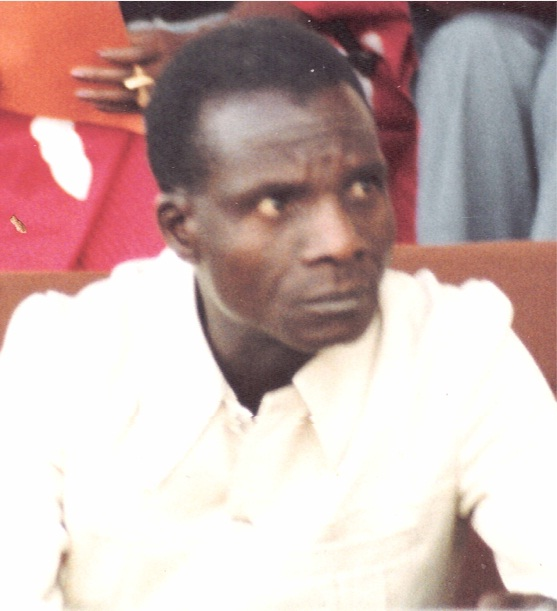
- Kountché in 1983

2nd President of Niger
- In office 15 April 1974 – 10 November 1987
- Prime Minister: Mamane Oumarou
- Vice President: Sani Souna Sido
- Preceded by: Hamani Diori
- Succeeded by: Ali Saibou

Personal details
- Born: 1 July 1931 Fandou, Colony of Niger, French West Africa
- Died: 10 November 1987 (aged 56) Paris, France
- Spouse: Mintou Kountché
- Relatives: Ali Saibou (cousin)

Military service
- Allegiance: France; Niger
- Branch/service: French Army; Niger Armed Forces
- Years of service: 1949–1961 (France); 1961–1987 (Niger)
- Rank: Sergeant (France); Major General (Niger)

Seyni Kountché (1 July 1931 – 10 November 1987) was a Nigerien military officer who led a 1974 coup d'état that deposed the government of Niger's first president, Hamani Diori. He ruled the country as military head of state from 15 April 1974 until his death on 10 November 1987. Stade Général Seyni Kountché, Niger's national stadium in Niamey, is named after him.

== Military career ==
Born in 1931 in the town of Damana Fandou, a child of Djerma aristocracy who traced their origins to the Djermakoy Tondikandie, Kountché began his military career in 1949, serving in the French colonial army. In 1957, he was promoted to the rank of sergeant. The French territory of Niger became independent as the Republic of Niger on 3 August 1960. One year after his country gained its independence, Kountché transferred to the Niger Army. From 1965 to 1966, he studied at the officers' training school in Paris and became deputy chief of staff of the armed forces soon after. He was promoted to armed forces chief of staff in 1973.

== Niger in 1974 ==
During this same period, the newly independent country of Niger faced many problems. Politically, the nation was ruled as a one-party state led by president Hamani Diori. Opposition to the regime was suppressed, sometimes violently. A severe drought lasted from 1968 to 1974, leading to food shortages and growing dissatisfaction with the government. The economy remained weak despite attempts to exploit the large reserves of uranium in the country. Widespread civil disorder followed allegations that some government ministers were misappropriating stocks of food aid.

== 1974 coup ==
On 15 April 1974, Seyni Kountché led a military coup that ended Diori's rule. Kountché's first official acts were to suspend the Constitution, dissolve the National Assembly, ban all political parties, and release political prisoners. A Supreme Military Council (CMS) was established on 17 April 1974 with Kountché as president. Its stated mandate was to distribute food aid fairly and to restore morality to public life. A consultative National Council for Development (CND) replaced the National Assembly. Although political parties were outlawed, opposition activists who were exiled during Diori's regime were allowed to return to Niger.

== Military governance ==
The military government's major preoccupation was planning an economic recovery. Generally amicable relations were maintained with France, and new links were formed with Arab states. Domestically, the country stabilized although personal and policy differences developed within the CMS. Plots to remove Kountché were thwarted in 1975 and again in 1976.

=== Return to constitutional governance ===
In 1981 Kountché began to increase civilian representation in the CMS, and in 1982 preparations were undertaken for a constitutional form of government. Thanks to the uranium windfall, workers' wages increased slightly. However, economic adjustment efforts were hampered by repeated droughts in 1984-85 and the closure of the border with Nigeria from 1984 to 1986. A civilian prime minister, Mamane Oumarou, was appointed on 24 January 1983. One year later, in January 1984, he established a commission to draft a pre-constitutional document, termed a 'national charter'. It was later approved in a national referendum. The charter provided for the establishment of non-elective, consultative institutions at both national and local levels.

=== Economic tensions and repression ===
Economic adjustment efforts during this period were impeded by the recurrence of drought in 1984 and 1985 along with the closure of the land border with Nigeria from 1984 to 1986. Niger's dependence on external financial assistance increased. Relations with the United States (by now the country's principal source of food aid) assumed considerable importance. But overall, Kountsche's rule was a rare example of an African military government that was able to solve the country's economic problems. Meanwhile, a period of renewed tension between Niger and Libya had fueled Libyan accusations of the persecution of the light-skinned, nomadic Tuareg population by the Kountché regime. Kountché rejected Libyan overtures to join the Organization of Saharan States because of Gaddafi's pronouncement in a speech at Benghazi in October 1980 that "Moors and Arab-Berber people were persecuted and oppressed in Mali and Niger". In May 1985, following an armed incident near the Niger-Libya border, all non-Nigerien Tuaregs were expelled from the country. Kountché advocated for economic liberal reforms.

== Death ==
Kountché's health deteriorated in late 1986 and it continued to worsen during 1987. He died at a Paris hospital of a brain tumor on 10 November 1987. Ali Saïbou succeeded him and on 14 November 1987, he was appointed president of the Supreme Military Council (CMS).

Government offices
Preceded by Hamani Diori	President of Niger; 1974–1987	Succeeded by Ali Saibou
