= Serkin =

Serkin (Russian: Сёркин or Russian: Серкин) is a surname. Notable people with the surname include:

- Peter Serkin (1947–2020), American classical pianist, son of Rudolf
- Rudolf Serkin (1903–1991), Bohemian-born American pianist
