= Kennedy Bridge (Niamey) =

Bridge in Niamey, Niger

Coordinates: 13°30′17″N 2°6′14″E

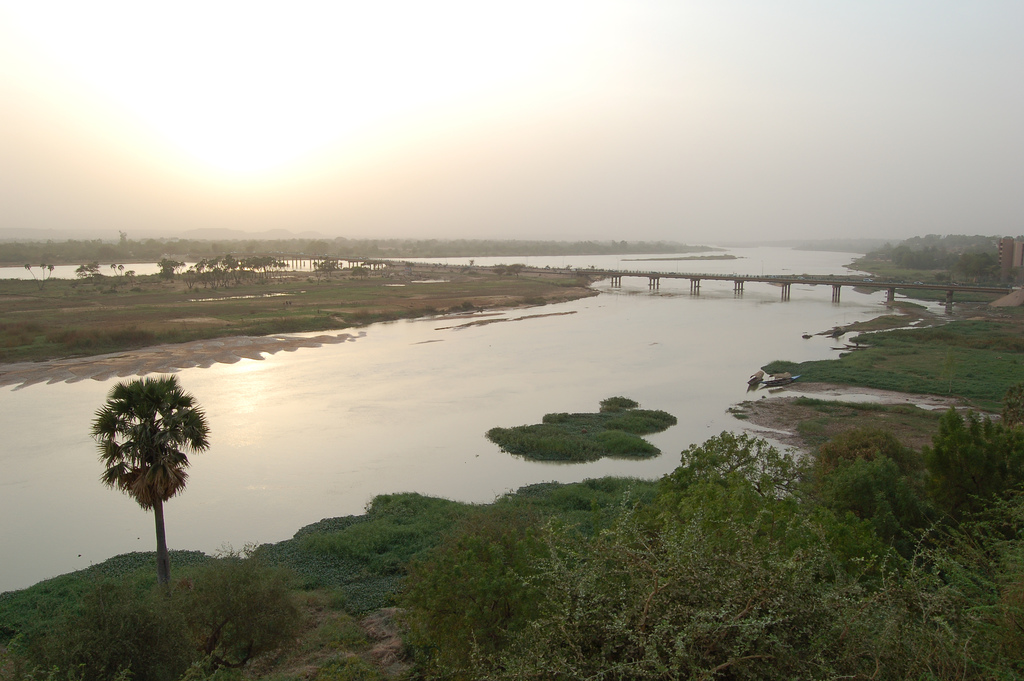
The Niger River, Kennedy Bridge and some of Niamey City Centre (right), taken from the roof of the UNV building, looking northwest. May 2006

The Kennedy Bridge is the main crossing for the Niger River in Niamey, Niger. It was built in 1970, and named for United States President John F. Kennedy. Its construction enabled Niamey to expand onto the right bank of the river to the west. On 9 February 1990, a confrontation between students of the University of Niamey and police on the bridge left 20 civilians dead, and hastened the end of the military regime led by General Ali Saibou.
