= Djermakoy =

The Djermakoy (var. Zermakoy, Zarmakoy, Djermakoye) is the title given to rulers of the Djerma/Zarma states in what is now southwest Niger. From the 1890s, the Djermakoy of the Dosso Kingdom came to dominate the entire Djerma area, and remaining local Djermakoy owed allegiance to him.

The title remains in use, and the Djermakoy of Dosso remains an influential figure in post-independence Niger. Djermakoye Issoufou Seydou played a leading role in Nigerien politics at the time of independence as a founder of the PPN, and later the UNIS parties, and as Vice-President and Minister of Justice from December 1958-October 1959, various ministerial posts from 1961-1965, Nigerien Ambassador to the United Nations and three postings as a Deputy Secretary General of the United Nations. Contemporary political leader Moumouni Adamou Djermakoye, a member of the Djerma aristocracy, also carries the title Djermakoye.
