= Niamey Grand Market =

Market in Niamey, Niger

Coordinates: 13°30′59″N 2°7′1″E

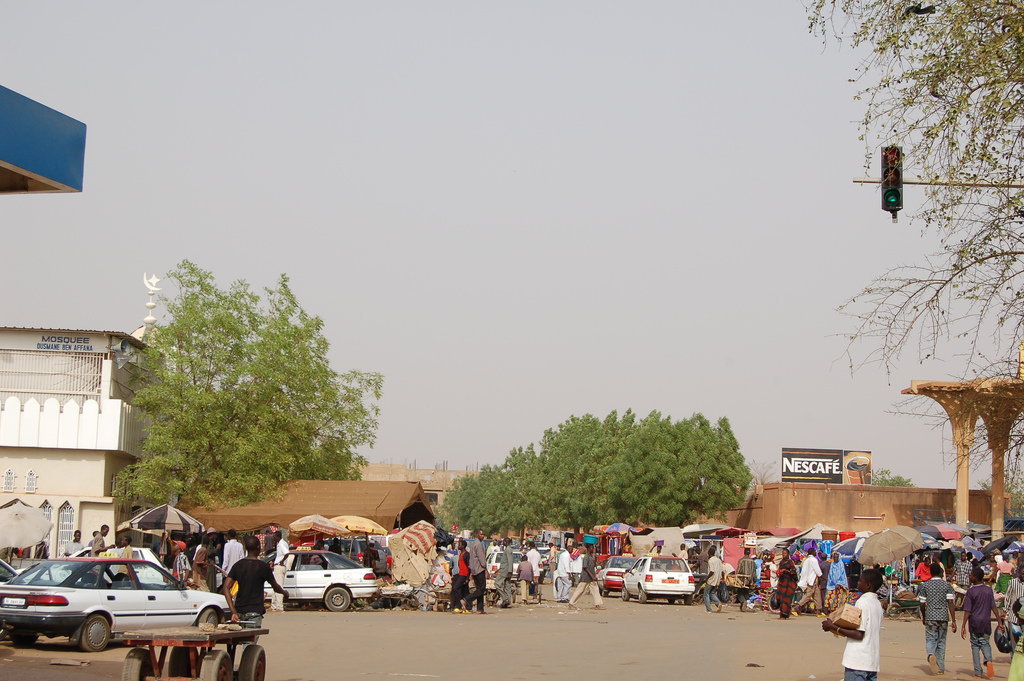
The edge of the Grand marché. The distinctive tree-like pillars which surround the central buildings can be seen on the extreme right of this picture.

The Niamey Grand Market (French: Grand marché de Niamey) is the largest market and shopping center in Niamey, the capital and largest city in the West African state of Niger.

== Location ==
The large market complex lies in the center of the city in a neighborhood named "Grand Marché" after it, east and south of the European style commercial and government center of the "Plateau" neighborhood. It was built within a colonial era park which divided the "European" and "African" sections of the city, south and west of the modern Stade Général Seyni Kountché and Niamey Grande Mosquée. The market is bordered on the west by the Boulevard de l'Independence, which is also the north-south route through the city of Route nationale 1.

== Infrastructure ==
A uniform structure for housing the market was first built in 1950, and is locally known as the Habou-Béné. A fire on 30 March 1982 destroyed the market, and it was reopened on 5 January 1987, after a rebuilding project which cost some 5 Billion CFA Francs. That incarnation housed 4000 shops, ranging from simple stalls and covered tables to the 1863 permanent structures which range from metal stalls to modern stores in two large buildings. In May 2009, another fire gutted portions of the market, destroying around 1500 stalls and stands, 128 of which were housed in metal stalls, and the rest in the open or in less permanent structures. The fire was believed to have begun in the area reserved for food stalls. Fire officials suspected an electrical cable short sparked the fire, which began at around 14:00 and was only controlled some four hours later.

The market complex is operated by a national government body, SOCOGEM ("Société de construction et de gestion des marchés", "Society for the Construction and Operation of Markets").

== Importance ==
The Niamey Grand Market has been called the commercial center of the entire county, as goods from across the nation and abroad pass through the center and are sold both wholesale and retail. The market, and especially its traditional craft center is an important tourist attraction, drawing an estimated 20,000 tourists a year. A large bus and taxi station lies just behind it.

== History ==
The market was built in as a uniform structure in 1950. A fire destroyed the market in 1982 and was rebuilt in 1987 with a cost of 5 billion francs. Today the Grand Market draws in an estimated 20,000 tourists per year.

== Sources ==
- Incendie, hier, au grand marché de Niamey: Véritable désastre économique. Assane Soumana & Seini Seydou Zakaria, Le Sahel (Niamey). 28 May 2009.
- Incendie au Grand marché de Niamey : mettre nos marchés à l'abri des flammes dévastatrices, il vaut mieux prévenir que guéri. Oumarou Moussa, le Sahel. 29 Mai 2009
- Incendie au Grand marché de Niamey : émotion et soupçon d'espoir chez les victimes. Zabeirou Moussa, le Sahel. 29 Mai 2009
