= 1952 Nigerien Territorial Assembly election =

- 30 March 1952
- All 50 seats in the Territorial Assembly; 26 seats needed for a majority
- Turnout: 48.16%
Party	Leader	Seats	+/–
UNIS	Georges Condat	34	New
RPF	Charles de Gaulle	14	New
Independents	–	2	−28
This lists parties that won seats. See the complete results below.

Territorial Assembly elections were held in Niger on 30 March 1952. The Union of Nigerien Independents and Sympathisers won 34 of the 35 seats in the Second College.

== Electoral system ==
The Territorial Assembly was elected using two colleges. The first college was restricted to French citizens and elected 15 members from three constituencies. The second college elected 35 members from seven constituencies, which were based on the seven regions.

== Results ==
Party	Votes	%	Seats
First College
Rally of the French People	558		14
Other parties			0
Independents	79		1
Total			15
Total votes	1,001	–	
Registered voters/turnout	1,577	63.47	
Second College
Union of Nigerien Independents and Sympathisers	41,051		34
Nigerien Progressive Party – African Democratic Rally	5,278		0
Other parties			0
Independents	3,700		1
Total			35
Total votes	51,094	–	
Registered voters/turnout	106,083	48.16	
Source: De Benoist
