= Soudouré =

Village in Niamey

Coordinates: 13°35′N 2°00′E

Soudouré is a village in western Niger. It is located along the Niger River northwest of the capital city, Niamey. It is located in the Niamey Capital District.

Soudouré is known as the birthplace of Hamani Diori, who served as the first president of an independent Niger from 1960 to 1974.
