= 1958 Nigerien constitutional referendum =

A referendum on the new constitution of France was held in Niger on 28 September 1958 as part of a wider referendum held across the French Union. The new constitution would see the country become part of the new French Community if accepted, or result in independence if rejected. It was approved by 78% of voters.

The vote was marred by widespread irregularities and manipulation by the colonial administration to counter Djibo Bakary's virulent criticism of the referendum. As Bakary denounced de Gaulle's "economic blackmail" towards the colonies and demanded immediate independence for Niger during the congress of the African Regroupment Party, he managed to rally a majority of the congress delegates behind his cause. This led French and pro-French figureheads including Jacques Foccart, Pierre Messmer and Félix Houphouët-Boigny to decide that Bakary should be brought down. The colonial administrator Louis Rollet (seen as too conciliatory) was replaced by Don Jean Colombani, who organized a massive campaign in favor of the "yes" vote. Moreover, Colombani worked with the far-right general Raoul Salan to bring death squads into villages seen as strongholds of Bakary's Sawaba and to terrorize the villagers into submission. This led to a victory for the "yes" camp in the referendum.

The French authorities would go on to push Bakary fully out of power, replace him with his cousin Hamani Diori and organize a new election for the Territorial Assembly of Niger - again marked by a campaign of repression against opponents - to consolidate the latter's power.

== Results ==
| Choice | Votes | % |
|---|---|---|
| For | 372,383 | 78.43 |
| Against | 102,395 | 21.57 |
| Total | 474,778 | 100.00 |
| Valid votes | 474,778 | 96.12 |
| Invalid/blank votes | 19,175 | 3.88 |
| Total votes | 493,953 | 100.00 |
| Registered voters/turnout | 1,320,174 | 37.42 |
Source: Direct Democracy
