= Nigerien Progressive Party – African Democratic Rally =

Political party in Niger

Nigerien Progressive Party-African Democratic Rally Parti progressiste nigérien-Rassemblement démocratique africain
- Abbreviation: PPN–RDA
- Leader: Abdoulaye Hamani Diori
- Founder: Hamani Diori
- Founded: 1946; 80 years ago (first) 1992; 34 years ago (second)
- Dissolved: 15 April 1974 (52 years, 220 days) (first) 27 July 2023 (3 years, 117 days) (suspensed) 26 March 2025 (1 year, 240 days) (second)
- Headquarters: Niamey
- Ideology: African nationalism Pan-Africanism; Conservatism; Nationalism; Traditionalism; Anti-economic liberalism Anti-collectivist economics
- Political position: Big tent
- International affiliation: African Democratic Rally

The Nigerien Progressive Party – African Democratic Rally (French: Parti progressiste nigérien-Rassemblement démocratique africain, PPN–RDA) was a political party in Niger. It was the nation's leading political party of the pre-independence era, becoming the sole legal party of the First Republic (1960–1974). It was led by Niger's first President, Hamani Diori. After the end of military rule, the party reappeared as a minor parliamentary party led by Diori's son, Abdoulaye Hamani Diori.

== History ==
=== Pre-independence ===
As the name indicates, the PPN confederated in 1946 with a grouping of regional pro-independence parties within French West Africa and French Equatorial Africa to form the Rassemblement Démocratique Africain (African Democratic Rally—RDA ). Under the leadership of Hamani Diori, the PPN paired appeals to traditional society within the Colony of Niger while its representatives worked with the French Communist Party in France, which was the only force supporting independence for France's colonial possessions.

In 1946 the single pro-Independence party in Niger was the Nigerien Progressive Party (PPN), of which Hamani Diori and Djibo Bakary were the most prominent members, and which numbered only 5000 members. Simultaneously, these colonial territories were allowed limited representation in the French National Assembly, with Niger allotted one seat in 1946 and a second in 1948. PPN Party leader Hamani Diori filled the first, and a French educated Niamey lawyer, Djibo Bakary, filled the second. Bakary, a leftist, helped push the party—already perceived as anti-French—in a populist direction. The PPN was allied to the pan-colony African Democratic Rally (RDA), which itself caucused with the French Communist Party in the National Assembly. Some elements, such as RDA leader Félix Houphouët-Boigny, were uncomfortable with this connection. Many in the PPN felt the same way, while many other, grouped around Bakary and the tiny Nigerien Trades Union movement, pulled to the left. Earlier splits of the PPN, of conservative Djerma traditional leaders and a small Franco-Nigerien contingent in 1946, were added to 1948 in reaction to Bakary and his circle and to the continued association with the RDA. Harou Kouka and Georges Condat split to form a group ("Parti Independent du Niger-Est PINE") that quickly joined with previous dissidents to create the Union of Nigerien Independents and Sympathisers (UNIS). This relatively conservative coalition benefited from French support, and gained control of the consultative institutions of the Niger colony from 1948-1952. Diori, much like RDA chair Félix Houphouët-Boigny, broke from the PCF in 1951 and by 1958 was close to the colonial authorities in Niamey. This faction retained both the PPN name and the connection with the RDA, while Djibo Bakary now broke from the RDA to retain ties with the French Communist Party. Bakary's new party, Sawaba, prospered in the 1957 Territorial Assembly elections to the detriment of the PPN. In the 1958 constitutional referendum and Assembly elections, the PPN supported continued association with France under the French Community, while its primary rival, called for immediate independence from France. The PPN swept the Assembly elections, with Diori becoming its chair (essentially, Prime Minister to the colonial governor's presidential role). Sawaba was suppressed and outlawed prior to independence in 1960 with the help of French officials.

=== Post-independence ===
==== Single party era ====
The PPN-RDA was the country's sole legal party from 1960 until 1974, when the regime of President Hamani Diori was overthrown in a military coup. As president of the PPN, Diori was the only candidate for president of the republic, and was re-elected unopposed for five-year terms in 1965 and 1970. In those same years, a single list of PPN-RDA candidates was returned to the National Assembly.

During this period public criticism of the leadership was forbidden, Assembly sessions were largely ceremonial, and practical governance was carried out by the Political Bureau of the PPN, headed by Diori, Boubou Hama, and a small cadre of supporters. another claim is that the government and the party leadership (Bureau politique national) were intertwined, A triumvirate consisting of Diori, Boubou Hama and Diamballa Maïga led both the party and the country. During his presidency, Diori relied heavily on the traditional tribal chiefs and the French military present.The PPN was reviled by many as tied to traditional elites (especially from the west of the country), too close a partner with French interests, and financially corrupt. The famine which struck the region following the 1969-73 drought, scandals surrounding lack of food aid, along with personal discontent amongst the military, led to the April 1974 coup which ended the PPN's role in Nigerien politics.

==== Democratic era ====
The PPN-RDA was resurrected in 1991, following the return to democracy, under the leadership of Diori's eldest son Abdoulaye Hamani Diori. It won two seats in the 1993 parliamentary elections, and nominated Oumarou Garba Issoufou for the subsequent presidential elections; he finished sixth out of eight candidates with 2% of the vote. The party was reduced to one seat in the 1995 parliamentary elections, and lost parliamentary representation after it boycotted the 1996 elections. When it ran in the 1999 elections it failed to win a seat.

It contested the 2004 general elections in an alliance with the Nigerien Party for Democracy and Socialism (PNDS) and Nigerien Self-Management Party (PNA). The joint list won four seats, and Abdoulaye Hamani Diori led its parliamentary delegation from 2004 until 2009.

The party opposed Mamadou Tandja's constitutional referendum of 2009 and was a member of the opposition FDD (Front for Defense of Democracy) and CFDR (Coordination of Forces for Democracy and the Republic) party coalitions during the 2009–10 Nigerien constitutional crisis. It endorsed Mahamadou Issoufou of the PNDS for the presidency in the 2011 general elections, but won no seats in the new National Assembly. It also failed to win a seat in the 2016 general elections.

== Composition of the Politburo 1956-1974 ==
- Chairman: Boubou Hama (Songhai)
- 1st Vice-President: Diamballa Maïga (Songhai)
- 2nd Vice-President: Touluou Malam (Zarma)
- Secretary General: Hamani Diori (Zarma)
- Deputy Secretary-General: Dandobi Mahamane (Maouri)
- Political Secretary: Courmo Barcourgne (removed in 1971) (Zarma)
- Economic Secretary: Noma Kaka (Maouri)
- Social secretary: Réné Delanne (removed in 1971) (métis)
- Financial Secretary: Barkiré Halidou (Zarma)
- Propaganda secretary: Alou Hamidou (Songhai)
- Propaganda Secretary: Issa Garba (Zarma)
- Secretary: Abdou Gao (Maouri)

== Electoral history ==
=== Presidential Elections ===
Election	Party candidate	Votes	%	Results
1965	Hamani Diori	1,678,912	100%	Elected ✓
1970	Hamani Diori	1,907,673	100%	Elected ✓

=== National Assembly elections ===
Election	Party leader	Votes	%	Seats	+/–	Position	Government
1952	Hamani Diori	5,278		0 / 35		▲2nd	Extra-parliamentary
1957	Hamani Diori	103,518	29.96%	19 / 50	▲19	2nd	Opposition
1958	Hamani Diori	(as part UCFA)		49 / 50	▲30	▲1st	Supermajority government
1965	Hamani Diori	1,677,763	100%	50 / 50	▲1	1st	Sole legal party
1970	Hamani Diori	1,850,968	100%	50 / 50	Steady	1st	Sole legal party
1989	Party closed following the 1974 coup						
1993	Abdoulaye Hamani Diori	32,615	2.60%	2 / 82	▲2	▲7th	Opposition
1995	Abdoulaye Hamani Diori	18,294	1.27%	1 / 83	▼1	▼8th	Opposition
1996	Abdoulaye Hamani Diori	Boycotted		0 / 83	▼1		Extra-parliamentary
1999	Abdoulaye Hamani Diori	10,912	0.62%	0 / 83	Steady		Extra-parliamentary
2004	Abdoulaye Hamani Diori	61,997	2.71% (joint list with PNDS–PNA)	4 / 113	▲4	▲8th	Opposition
2011	Abdoulaye Hamani Diori	12,549	0.39%	0 / 113	▼4		Extra-parliamentary
2016		22,956	0.48%	0 / 171	Steady		Extra-parliamentary
2020–21		9,053	0.19%	0 / 166	Steady		Extra-parliamentary

== See also ==
- Parmehutu
- Edouard Karemera
