= 1974 Nigerien coup d'état =

Military overthrow of Hamani Diori

Date	15 April 1974 (1. am until morning)
Location	Niger
Result	Government overthrown; Hamani Diori deposed; Establishment of the CMS; Seyni Kountché installed as head of state

Belligerents
Government of Niger	Niger Armed Forces

Commanders and leaders
(Niger) President Hamani Diori	(Niger) Seyni Kountché (Niger) Mamadou Tandja

Units involved
Republican Guard	

Strength
	Unknown

Casualties and losses
Several (including Aissa Diori)	

The 1974 Nigerien coup d'état was a largely bloodless military insurrection which overthrew the first postcolonial government of Niger. The government that followed, while plagued by coup attempts of its own, survived until 1991.

== Background ==
The Sahel drought of 1968–72 had aggravated existing tensions in the single party government of the ruling PPN. Widespread civil disorder followed allegations that some government ministers were misappropriating stocks of food aid and accused President Hamani Diori of consolidating power. Diori limited cabinet appointments to fellow Djerma, family members, and close friends. In addition, he acquired new powers by declaring himself the minister of foreign and defense affairs. Diori was the longest serving leader in the Organisation of African Unity, which he helped maintain, and he was well-known as the main international negotiator for francophone Africa.

Despite receiving warnings that Seyni Kountché was unreliable as early as 1973, Diori nonetheless promoted him to chief of staff, in the replacement of Balla-Arabé assigned to the Grand Chancellery. Besides the drought, the army resented being used for tax collection and other political activities. Shortly before the coup, the Nigerien government signed a mutual defense treaty with Libya which enraged army members. According to Kountché, over 3,000 tons of grain were held in a warehouse waiting for prices to rise, and when he brought the situation to Diori's attention, the president did nothing.

== Coup ==
On 15 April 1974, Lieutenant-Colonel Seyni Kountché led a military coup that ended the fourteen-year rule of Diori. The military coup began at 1 AM on the morning of 15 April, with all but a handful of units quickly declaring for the coup leaders. The personal guard of President Hamani Diori, the all-Tuareg Republican Guard was the only unit to resist, under the orders of Diori's wife Aissa Diori. She and a small number of Guardsmen were killed at the presidential palace after dawn on 15 April. Diori, President of the National Assembly, Boubou Hama and several other PPN politicians in Niamey were arrested in the operation. Diori's regime was the twenty-fifth in Africa to fall to a coup d'etat in eleven years.

The stated reasons for the coup was widespread corruption, the lack of democracy, and too much focus on foreign affairs and not enough on domestic issues. It was commonly believed that France was involved in some way in the coup due to their ties to the uranium industry in Niger, which they effectively monopolized. However, immediately after the coup, Kountché ordered the expulsion of the commander in chief of the French garrison in Niger, followed by the rest of the troops several weeks later. Kountché claimed the French were being divisive and patronising toward the Nigerien military.

== Aftermath ==
Diori was imprisoned until 1984 and remained under house arrest. Kountché's first official acts were to suspend the Constitution, dissolve the National Assembly, ban all political parties, and release political prisoners. A Supreme Military Council (CMS) was established on 17 April 1974 with Kountché as president. Its stated mandate was to distribute food aid fairly and to restore morality to public life. As a result, the army established four grain distribution centers in Zinder, Maradi, Birni-N'Konni and N'guigmi and moved important drought relief goods. Groundnuts were distributed to farmers for hunger relief rather than agriculture. The military council pledged to honor all international agreements, reducing the likely of a foreign overthrow of the coup.

A consultative National Council for Development (CND) replaced the National Assembly. Due to the food policies of the new administration, support for the coup was high among the people of Niger. Although political parties were outlawed, opposition activists who were exiled during Diori's regime were allowed to return to Niger provided they would avoid political activity. In August 1975, Major Sani Souna Sido allegedly attempted a coup against Kountche which was quickly suppressed, with Sido being executed. On 21 February 1976, the regime appointed a majority of civilians to the cabinet. Two more coups were attempted on 15 March 1976 and 5 October 1983, but both failed.

While a period of relative prosperity, the military government of the period allowed little free expression and engaged in arbitrary imprisonment and killing. The first presidential elections took place in 1993 (33 years after independence), and the first municipal elections only took place in 2007.
