= Djibo Bakary =

Nigerien politician (1922–1998)

- Bakary pictured in Les Raisons de Notre Lutte (1961), the Sawaba party manifesto

President of the Government Council of Niger
- In office 26 July 1958 – 10 October 1958
- Preceded by: Paul Camille Bordier
- Succeeded by: Hamani Diori

Vice President of the Government Council of Niger
- Preceded by: Post established

Mayor of Niamey
- In office 18 November 1956 – 28 September 1958
- Preceded by: Post established
- Succeeded by: Boubou Hama

Personal details
- Born: 1922 Soudouré, Niger, French West Africa
- Died: 16 April 1998 (aged 75–76) Niamey, Niger
- Party: PPN-RDA (until 1954); UDN (1954-1956); Sawaba (from 1956)
- Relations: Hamani Diori (cousin)

Djibo Bakary (1922 – 16 April 1998) was a socialist politician and an important figure in the independence movement of Niger. Bakary was the first Nigerien to hold local executive power since the beginning of French colonialism. He was replaced as leader by his cousin Hamani Diori prior to the country's independence.

== Life and career ==
Djibo Bakary came to prominence as the general secretary of the PPN - which had been founded as the Nigerien branch of the RDA - in the early 1950s. He conflicted with RDA leader Félix Houphouët-Boigny as the latter gradually imposed a pro-French line on the party and distanced himself from the French Communist Party. Bakary criticized this decision by saying that it should have been preceded by a democratic debate inside the party instead of being unilaterally declared. However, Houphouët sent a three-man mission (composed of Diori, Ouezzin Coulibaly and Mamadou Konaté) to communicate the new line to the various local sections; this mission fired Bakary as PPN general secretary. As Diori and Boubou Hama gained control over the PPN, Bakary proceeded to found a new party, Sawaba, the next year. He was then expelled from the PPN.

Bakary served as Mayor of Niamey from 1956 to 1958. From 20 May 1957 to 14 December 1958, he held the position of Vice President of the Council of Government. From 26 July 1958 to 10 October 1958, he was the President of the Government Council of Niger.

In July 1958, tensions between Bakary and his pro-French colleagues again mounted. Bakary virulently opposed Charles de Gaulle's constitutional referendum during the congress of the African Regroupment Party in Cotonou. As he denounced de Gaulle's "economic blackmail" towards the colonies and demanded immediate independence for Niger, he managed to rally a majority of the congress delegates behind his cause. This led figureheads including Jacques Foccart, Pierre Messmer and Houphouët-Boigny to decide that Bakary should be brought down. The colonial administrator Louis Rollet (seen as too conciliatory) was replaced by Don Jean Colombani, who organized a massive campaign in favor of the "yes" vote on the referendum. Moreover, Colombani worked with the far-right general Raoul Salan to bring death squads into villages seen as Sawaba strongholds and to terrorize the villagers into submission. This led to a victory for the "yes" camp in the Nigerien referendum. After this electoral victory, the French authorities pushed Bakary fully out of power, replaced him with Diori and organized a new election for the Territorial Assembly of Niger - again marked by a campaign of repression against opponents - to consolidate Diori's power.

== Legacy ==
After the 2023 Niger coup d'état, the Junta started to rename places with French names including "Avenue General Charles de Gaulle" which was renamed into "Avenue Djibo Bakary" in honor of Bakary.
