= Sawaba =

Political party in Niger

Union of Popular Forces for Democracy and Progress–Sawaba Union des forces populaires pour la démocratie et le progrès – Sawaba
- Leader: Djibo Bakary
- Founded: 1954
- Split from: PPN-RDA
- Newspaper: Azalaï
- Ideology: Socialism; Marxism (until 1991); Hausa interests Maoism (1960s-70s); Social democracy (from 1991)
- Political position: Left-wing (1954-1959); Far-left (1959-1991); Center-left (from 1991)
- International affiliation: African Socialist Movement (historical)

The Union of Popular Forces for Democracy and Progress–Sawaba (French: Union des forces populaires pour la démocratie et le progrès – Sawaba, UDFP–Sawaba) is a political party in Niger, founded as the Nigerien Democratic Union (Union démocratique nigérienne, UDN) in 1954. The original party, founded by Nigerien Progressive Party (PPN) co-leader Djibo Bakary when he was expelled from the PPN. In the mid-1950s it created a broad coalition led by urban leftists but forged of conservative rural notables, especially from Hausa areas, which dominated the nascent Nigerien independence movement. In this period it was renamed Mouvement socialiste africain–Sawaba, and then simply Sawaba. In pushing for complete independence from France in a 1958 referendum, the party fractured. At independence in 1960 it found itself in opposition and outlawed by Niger's first president, Hamani Diori. From exile, the party attempted an abortive guerrilla campaign in the mid-1960s, and then largely disappeared. Its leadership returned to Niger following the 1974 military coup, but soon found themselves arrested, in exile, or marginalised. Following the return of democracy in 1991, the now elderly Bakary re-founded the party as UDFP–Sawaba. In the 1993 elections it took only a small numbers of votes. Within the year, the party had split, with a new faction (UDFR–Sawaba) joining the government coalition. Despite Bakary's death in 1998 and their continued electoral underachievement, both parties holding the Sawaba name continue.

== History ==
=== Pre-independence ===
Sawaba was an outgrowth of several sources, and passed through several name changes prior to Niger's independence from France in 1960. Under first the French Union and then the French Community, the colonies of French West Africa began to develop semi-autonomous political institutions in the decade and a half of the French Fourth Republic. Territories, like Niger, were granted consultative posts, first to the colonial government of West Africa (in Dakar), and later in Territorial Assemblies. These bodies had very limited powers, limited seats for Africans, and those elected were chosen by a very restricted electorate.

In 1946 the single pro-independence party in Niger was the Nigerien Progressive Party (PPN), of which Djibo Bakary was a prominent member, and which numbered only 5,000 members. Simultaneously, these colonial territories were allowed limited representation in the French National Assembly, with Niger allotted one seat in 1946 and a second in 1948. PPN Party leader Hamani Diori filled the first, and a French educated Niamey lawyer, Djibo Bakary filled the second. Bakary, a leftist, helped push the party—already perceived as anti-French—in a populist direction. The PPN was allied to the pan-colony African Democratic Rally (RDA), which itself caucused with the French Communist Party in the National Assembly. Some elements, such as RDA leader Félix Houphouët-Boigny, were uncomfortable with this connection. Many in the PPN felt the same way, while many other, grouped around Bakary and the tiny Nigerien Trades Union movement, pulled to the left. Earlier splits of the PPN, of conservative Djerma traditional leaders and a small Franco-Nigerien contingent in 1946, were added to 1948 in reaction to Bakary and his circle and to the continued association with the RDA. Harou Kouka and Georges Condat split to form a group (Parti Independent du Niger-Est, PINE) that quickly joined with previous dissidents to create the Union of Nigerien Independents and Sympathisers (UNIS). This relatively conservative coalition benefited from French support, and gained control of the consultative institutions of the Niger colony from 1948-1952.

==== Formation of UDN ====
In the interim, the PPN split further. The RDA, never ideologically cohesive, finally split from the French Communist Party, in 1951, in part because of the ideological differences of most African independence leaders with Communism, but also under pressure of vehemently anti-communist Colonial administrators in French West Africa, and at the urging of moderates like the French Section of the Workers' International (SFIO) in the French Assembly. The PPN then split on the issue of connection to the Communists, a rupture that had been growing since its formation. Djibo Bakary was expelled from the RDA for his refusal to break from the PCF, and the left of the PPN formed the UDN (Nigerien Democratic Union) in 1954.

The UDN, although small in numbers and led by a leftist Djerma intellectual, had powerful support amongst elements of the Hausa east of Niger, who viewed the UNIS (one of whose leaders was the Djermakoy of Dosso) as unrepresentative of their interests. In 1954-56 the UNIS itself split over involvement in the African Convention coalition, fracturing into the Nigerien Democratic Forces (FDN) and the Nigerien Action Bloc (BNA). The PPN was the winner in this confusion, forming the largest alliance of traditional rulers while retaining its pro-independence stance. The UDN, on the other hand, became the primary opposition, with some PPN members claiming Bakary was being aided by the French, simply to damage the PPN.

==== Rule ====
In the 1955 Territorial elections, the BNA defeated the PPN, with the UDN making little ground. But politics in the Niger Territory of this period was a largely unideological game of traditional and urban elites. The 1955 elections saw less than 250,000 votes cast in a nation of almost 3 million, and these were mostly won in blocks directed by the elite of Djermakoys, Sultans, Mais, Sarkis, and chiefs. Between 1954 and 1956, Bakary and the UDN managed to cobble together a coalition of Zinder merchants, Maradi notables, the Djermakoy and his BNA party, and the tiny urban labour and leftist movements of Niamey. This last group led the UDN into an interterritorial faction called the African Socialist Movement (MSA). The UDN absorbed the BNA, and took the name "Sawaba": Hausa for "Freedom". In the run up to the 1956 Niger colony municipal elections, while negotiations were still ongoing to create the MSA bloc, the Nigerien party preemptively rechristened itself Mouvement Socialiste Africain–Sawaba.

This new bloc, aided by the distaste of the French authorities for the PPN, led Sawaba to victory in Niamey and Hausaland. In 1956 Bakary became the mayor of Niamey. In 1957 the party won the Territorial legislative elections, and Bakary, as party leader, became President of the Niger Territorial Assembly.

But Sawaba's left soon fell afoul of the Territories French administrator, Governor Colombani. With the Creation of the French Fifth Republic, all French colonial territories were to vote on a new mandate for the continuation of French control in a new, if largely unchanged, structure, the French Community. The 1956 reforms of the Loi Cadre and the French Union had not dampened resistance to French rule in east Asia, Madagascar and elsewhere. The 1958 constitution aimed to do just this. With the RDA leadership behind the new reform, the French seemed certain to maintain legal authority for their control of West Africa, until two African parties unexpectedly came out for a "No" vote: Sekou Toure's Guinean Democratic Party in Guinea and Djibo Bakary and Sawaba.

The French authorities in Guinea failed to, despite much effort, to encourage or coerce a "yes" vote, and it became the first of the French African colonies to declare independence in December 1958. Sawaba, on the other hand, was roundly defeated, garnering barely 20% of the vote. Its Hausa, Fulani and Djerma traditionalist leaders deserted the party and the French withdrew their support and began to aid the PPN, who had formed their own coalition to advocate for a "Yes" vote on the referendum. The vote was immediately followed by one for the new Nigerian Constituent Assembly which was to replace the Territorial Assembly under the French plan. The PPN not only won, but took 44 seats to Sawaba's 8.

With the ascension of Diori and the PPN, Sawaba was banned by the authorities in 1959, just prior to the first elections for the new National Assembly of Niger. Niger did not have multiparty legislative elections again until 1993.

=== Post-independence ===
==== Underground 1960-1974 ====
In June 1960, 18 Sawabists were arrested on conspiracy charges, including Abdoulaye Mamani, Amadou Sekou and Issaka Koke. The party was forced underground. Bakary went into exile, to Ghana, East Germany and Guinea until 1975.

Gradually Sawaba moved from a pro-Soviet to a pro-China position. On April 13, 1963, the party tried to kill president Hamani Diori with a grenade attack. Guerrilla forces were allegedly trained in Algeria, Ghana and China. In November 1964 the Sawaba guerrillas entered Niger attacking the small desert outpost of Tamanrasset, and after engaging in a high-profile skirmish, were arrested. Both the government and Sawaba publicised this for their own ends. With the overthrow of Malian leader Modibo Keita in 1968, and the eventual death of Chairman Mao Zedong in China, the party reoriented itself back to a pro-Soviet position.

==== 1974-91 ====
Following the 1974 coup which removed Diori, Bakary returned to Niger in an attempt to bring Sawaba above ground, but he, like his old rival, was confined to house arrest under the military regime in 1977, accused of breaking his pledge to stay out of politics.

==== Post-1991 ====
Following the move to democratization in 1991-1993, Sawaba re-emerged as a left-wing parliamentary party. Bakary led the party, now called the UDFP–Sawaba. In 1992, the tiny party split further, with the UDFR–Sawaba moving to a center-left position and from 1991 to 1996 becoming a minor member of the Alliance of the Forces of Change (AFC) coalition, ironically beside the reformation of its bitter enemy from the 1950s, the PPN. Djibo Bakary led the UDFP–Sawaba faction into coalition with the rival National Movement for the Development of Society coalition, until his death in 1998; the 1993 parliamentary elections saw the party win two seats in the National Assembly, and in the subsequent presidential elections, Bakary finished last in a field of eight candidates with 1.7% of the vote. Sawaba lost both seats in the early elections in 1995, and boycotted the 1996 parliamentary elections that followed a coup earlier in the year. The party returned to contest the 1999 general elections, but received only 0.6% of the vote and failed to win a seat. The 2004 elections saw its vote share fall to 0.5%, with the party remaining seatless. It did not contest the 2009 parliamentary elections or the 2011 or 2016 general elections.
