= Colony of Niger =

1900–1960 French possession in West Africa

Colony of Niger Colonie du Niger (French) Mulkin Mallakar Nijar (Hausa)
- 1922–1960
- Flag
- Anthem: La Marseillaise
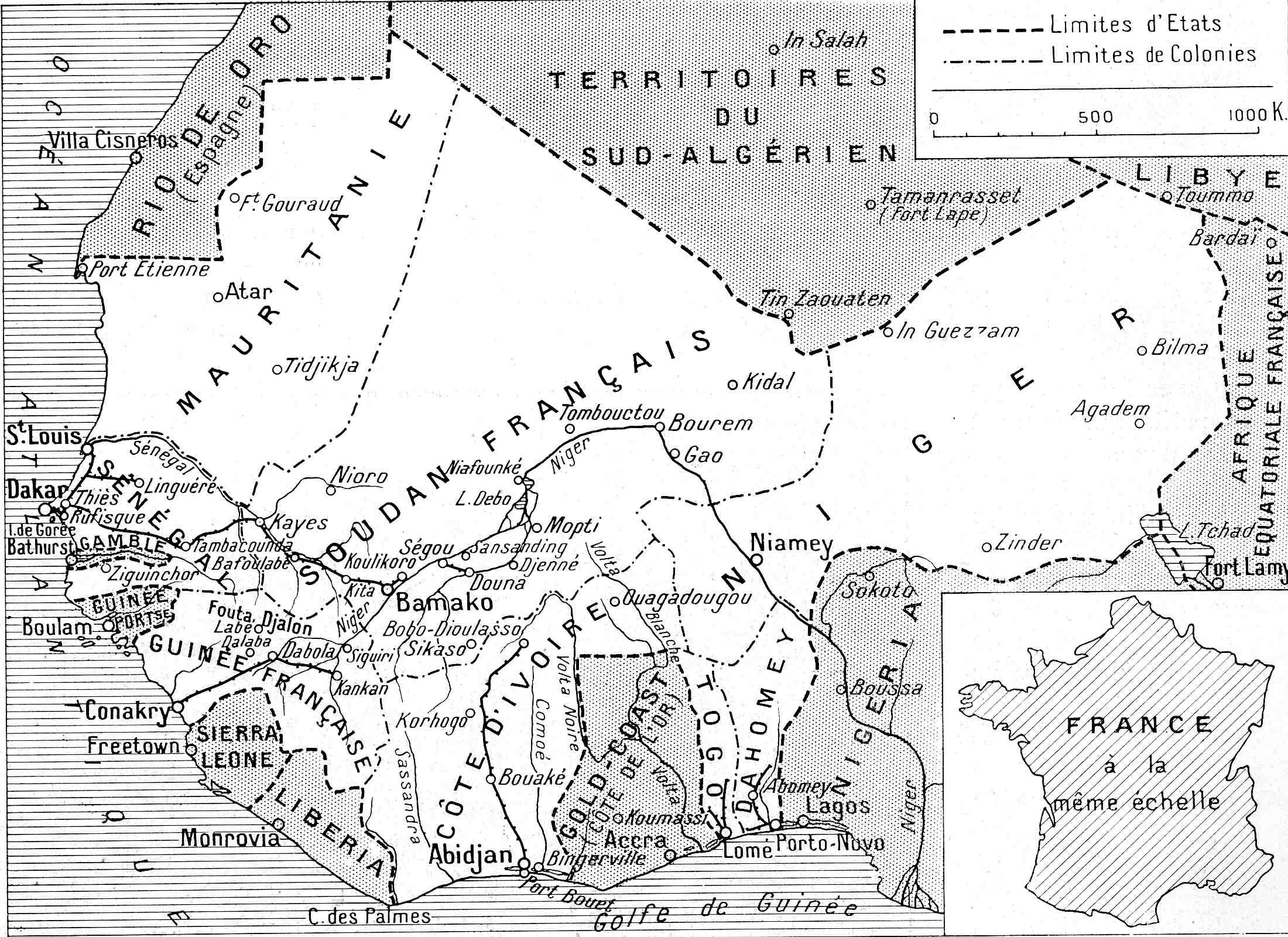
- French West Africa in 1936. Note the Colonie du Niger, lacking the earlier Tibesti area of Chad, includes the later eastern Upper Volta
- Status: Colony (1922–1946); Overseas territory (1946–1958); Autonomous republic (1958–1960)
- Capital: Zinder (1922–1926); Niamey (1926–1960)
- Common languages: French; Hausa
- Religion: Islam, Christianity
- Lieutenant Governor
  - 1922–1929: Jules Brévié
  - 1958–1959: Louis Félix Rollet
- High Commissioner
  - 1959–1960: Jean Colombani
- Prime Minister
  - 1957–1958: Djibo Bakary
  - 1958–1960: Hamani Diori
- History
  - Established: 13 October 1922
  - Status changed to overseas territory: 13 October 1946
  - Autonomy: 19 December 1958
  - Independence: 3 August 1960

Area
- 1940: 1,292,405 km^{2} (499,000 sq mi)
- 1948: 1,218,994 km^{2} (470,656 sq mi)

Population
  - 1936: 1,747,000
  - 1940: 1,809,576
  - 1948: 2,029,000
- Currency: French West African franc (1922–1945); CFA franc (1945–1960)
Preceded by	Succeeded by
Upper Senegal and Niger	Republic of the Niger
- Today part of: Niger

The Colony of Niger (French: Colonie du Niger; Hausa: Mulkin Mallakar Nijar) was a French colonial possession covering much of the territory of the modern West African state of Niger, as well as portions of Mali, Burkina Faso and Chad. It existed in various forms from 1900 to 1960 but was titled the Colonie du Niger only from 1922 to 1960.

== Military territory ==
While French took control of some of the areas of modern Niger began in the 1890s, a formal Zinder Military Territory was formed on 23 July 1900. This military territory only governed what is modern southern Niger, with only nominal rule east of Zinder or north of Tanout. Its Commandant was based at the village of Sorbo-Haoussa near Niamey, where the headquarters was moved in 1903. Administratively, it was part of the Senegambia and Niger Colony from 1902 to 1904 and Upper Senegal and Niger colony from 1904 to 1911. While commanded by officers of the French Troupes de marine, its budget and administration was dependent on the Lieutenant Governor at Kayes (latter Bamako), and military decision making—as well as contact with authorities in the Metropole or other colonies was through the Governor General in Dakar. The area also appears on French maps as the "Third Military Territory". On 22 June 1910 the territory was renamed Niger Military Territory, and included parts of modern northeast Mali (Gao Cercle) and Northern Chad (Tibesti Cercle). On 21 June 1911 the Cercle of Gao ceded to French Sudan, and throughout the late 1910s, efforts were made to establish permanent French posts in the north and east, in Bilma, N'guigmi and elsewhere. In 1911, the headquarters of the territory was moved to Zinder, reflecting both the relative peacefulness of the west of the territory, and the fear of incursion from the British to the South and the Italians from Libya. Despite this, French control of the northern and eastern areas remained minimal. Along with Mauritania, Niger remained the only part of French West Africa to remain under military rule.

== Civilian colonial rule ==
On 13 October 1922 the civilian Colony of Niger took control of most of southern and western areas, with a lieutenant governor reporting to the Governor General of French West Africa. The 1919 creation of French Upper Volta as a civil colony removed the areas of modern Niger west of the Niger River. In 1926, the capital was moved again to Niamey from Zinder. In 1931, Tibesti Cercle ceded to Chad Colony in French Equatorial Africa, and in 1932, the colony of French Upper Volta was divided amongst its neighbors, with the Cercles of Dori and Fada N'gourma ceded to Niger Colony.

== World War II ==
Niger Colony officials, unlike neighboring Chad, remained loyal to the French Vichy government after 1940, and thus closed its southern border (to Nigeria) and eastern border until 1944.

== Decolonization ==
On 31 December 1946 the Military Territories of N'Guigmi and Agadez were ceded to Niger Colony, leaving only Bilma Cercle as the last military-run section of modern Niger. This area in the far north east only came under French civilian administration in 1956.

In 1947, French Upper Volta was reconstituted, and the Cercles of Dori and Fada N'Gourma ceded to Upper Volta Colony. While there were minor border changes after 1947, the modern borders of Niger were roughly established with this change.

Following the 1956 Loi Cadre, rudiments of internal rule were created with the Territorial Assembly of Niger elected by popular vote, but holding only advisory and administrative powers. In 1958 the French Community succeed the French Union. On 25 August 1958 the Lieutenant Governor became High Commissioner of Niger, but remained Head of State of a quasi-independent state which controlled some purely internal administration.

The Constitution of 25 February 1959 was ratified by the Constituent Assembly of Niger, a body created for this purpose from the Territorial Assembly of Niger elected in December 1958. On 12 March 1959 the Constituent Assembly became the Legislative Assembly of Niger, with the head of government, Hamani Diori, retaining the title of President of the Council. Nominal executive powers were vested in the Assembly, with the constitution establishing elements, such as the flag of Niger, the national anthem of Niger and the coat of arms of Niger, along with language on naming of political bodies, rights and powers which have been retained in subsequent texts.

Following the Algerian War and the collapse of the French Fourth Republic, the colonies of the French Union became fully independent in 1960. Niger ratified its first fully independent constitution on 8 November 1960, and Jean Colombani stepped down as high commissioner on 10 November 1960.

== See also ==
- Niger
- History of Niger
- List of colonial governors of Niger
