= Hamani Diori =

President of Niger from 1960 to 1974

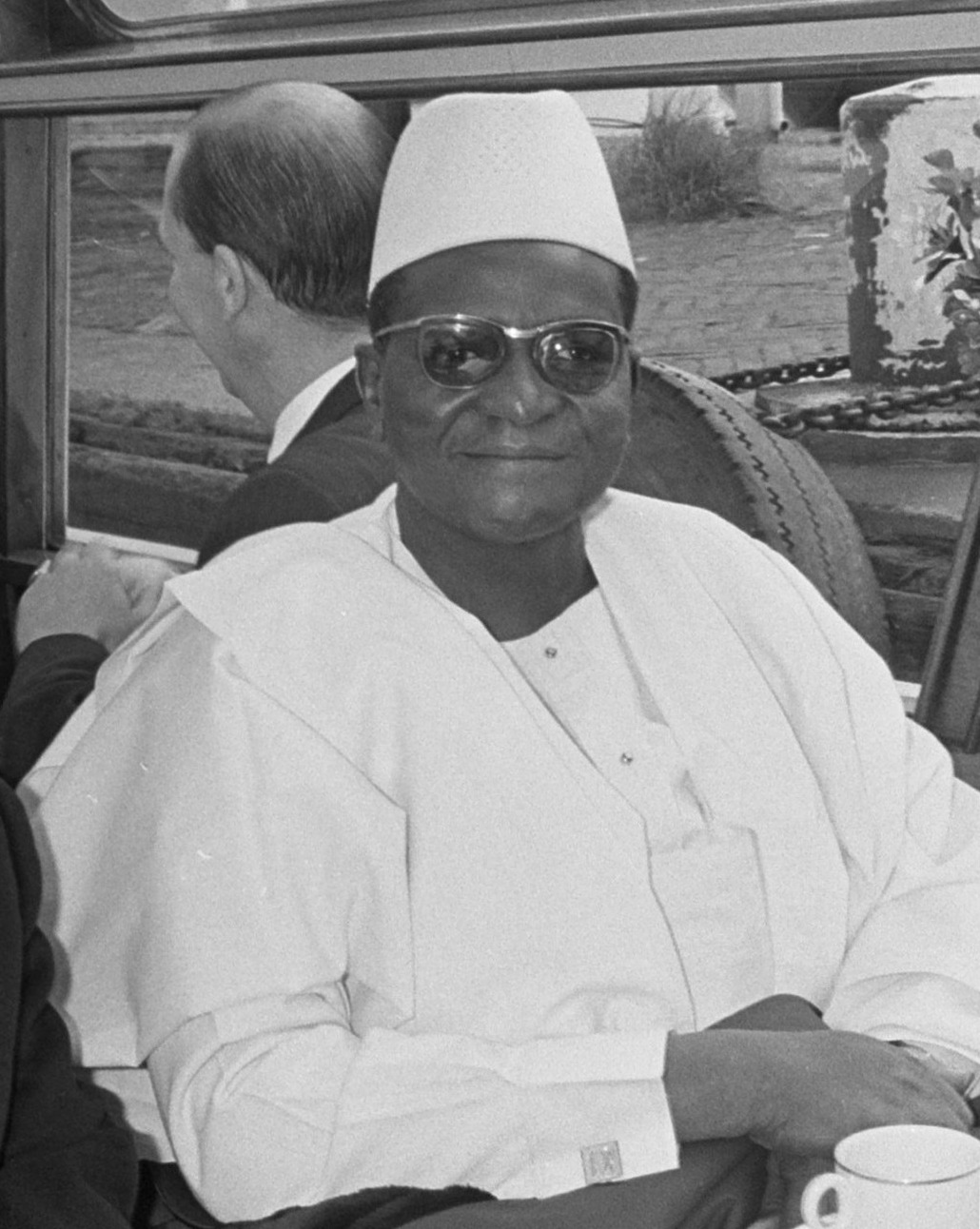
- Diori in 1968

1st President of Niger
- In office 3 August 1960 – 15 April 1974
- Preceded by: Himself as Prime Minister of Niger, French Community
- Succeeded by: Seyni Kountché

1st Prime Minister of Niger
- In office 10 October 1958 – 15 April 1974
- Preceded by: Djibo Bakary
- Succeeded by: Seyni Kountché

Personal details
- Born: 6 June 1916 Soudouré, Niger, French West Africa
- Died: 23 April 1989 (aged 72) Rabat, Morocco
- Party: PPN-RDA
- Spouse: Aissa Diori
- Relations: Djibo Bakary (cousin)
- Children: Abdoulaye Hamani Diori

Hamani Diori (6 June 1916 – 23 April 1989) was the first President of the Republic of Niger. He was appointed to that office in 1960, when Niger gained independence from France. Although corruption was a common feature of his administration, he gained international respect for his role as a spokesman for African affairs and as a popular arbitrator in conflicts. His rule ended with a military coup in 1974.

== Early life ==
Born in Soudouré, near the capital, Niamey, Diori was the son of a public health officer in the French colonial administration. He attended William Ponty Teachers' Training College in Dakar, Senegal, and worked as a teacher in Niger from 1936 to 1938, then became a Hausa and Djerma foreign language instructor at the Institute of Study Abroad, in Paris.

== Independence activism ==
In 1946, while working as the headmaster of a school in Niger’s capital city of Niamey, he became one of the founders of the Nigerien Progressive Party (PPN), a regional branch of the African Democratic Rally (RDA). Later that year, he was elected to the French National Assembly. In the 1951 election, Diori was defeated by his cousin and political rival Djibo Bakary. He was again elected to the assembly in 1956, and was chosen deputy-speaker.

In 1958, after a referendum that granted Niger self-government, Diori became president of the provisional government. He then became Prime Minister of the republic in 1959.

== Presidency ==
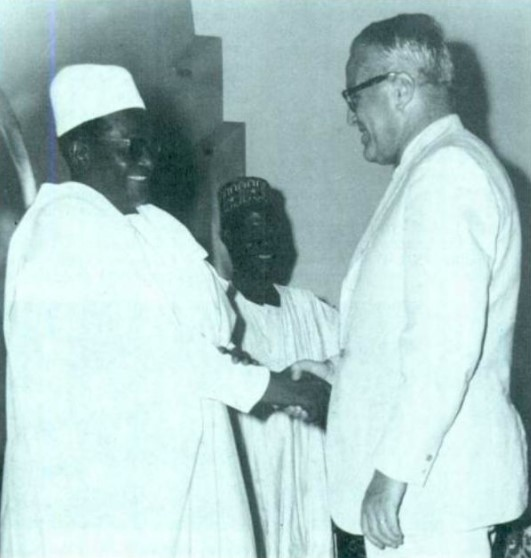
Diori (left) greeting United States Assistant Secretary of State for African Affairs Joseph Palmer II in 1968

Niger gained independence from France on 3 August 1960 and Diori was elected president by the country's national assembly in November 1960. Organizing a powerful coalition of Hausa, Fula, and (most prominently) Djerma leaders, including chiefs and traditionalists, in support of Niger’s independence referendum, Diori gained French favor.

Soon after independence, Diori made the PPN to be the only legally permitted party. His government favored the maintenance of traditional social structures and the retention of close economic ties with France. From the early 1960s, he ruled through a small number of pre-independence figures who sat on the PPN Politburo and largely bypassed even the cabinet. In addition to being both president of the republic and president of the PPN, Diori directly led a number of Ministries. From 1960 to 1963 he served as his own defence minister and foreign minister, and again took over the Foreign Ministry from 1965 to 1967. Most prominent, and perhaps most powerful, among Diori's advisers was writer and President of the National Assembly of Niger, Boubou Hama, who one writer has called the "eminence grise" behind Diori's rule. The National Assembly of Niger met in largely ceremonial yearly sittings to ratify government positions. Traditional notables, elected as parliamentary representatives, often unanimously endorsed government proposals. As president of the PPN, Diori was the only candidate for president of the republic, and as such was re-elected unopposed in 1965 and 1970.

He gained worldwide respect for his role as a spokesman for African affairs and as a popular arbitrator in conflicts involving other African nations. Domestically, however, his administration was rife with corruption, and the government was unable to implement much-needed reforms or to alleviate the widespread famine brought on by the Sahelian drought of the early 1970s. Increasingly criticized at home for his negligence in domestic matters, Diori put down a coup in December 1963, which occurred concurrently with a border dispute with the Republic of Dahomey. He also narrowly escaped assassination in 1965. Faced with an attempted military coup and attacks by members of Sawaba, he used French advisers and troops to strengthen his rule. Close links with France lead to student and union protests against what they described as "French neocolonialism". However, his relationship with France suffered when his government voiced dissatisfaction with the level of investment in uranium production when Georges Pompidou visited Niger in 1972.

== Unrest and fall ==
Widespread civil disorder followed allegations that some government ministers were misappropriating stocks of food aid and accused Diori of consolidating power. Diori limited cabinet appointments to fellow Djerma, family members, and close friends. In addition, he acquired new powers by declaring himself the minister of foreign and defense affairs. On 15 April 1974, Lieutenant colonel Seyni Kountché led a military coup that ended Diori's rule. He was imprisoned for six years. After his release in 1980, he remained under house arrest until 1987.

After being released from house arrest, he moved to Morocco, where he died on 23 April 1989 at the age of 72.

Preceded by Post created	Prime Minister of Niger; 1958–1960	Succeeded by Himself as President
Preceded by Himself as Prime Minister	President of Niger; 1960–1974	Succeeded by Seyni Kountché
Preceded by Adamou Mayaki	Foreign Minister of Niger; 1965–14 April 1967	Succeeded by Abdou Sidikou
Preceded by (–)	Foreign Minister of Niger; 1960–1963	Succeeded by Adamou Mayaki
