= Miss South Africa 2019 =

Beauty pageant edition

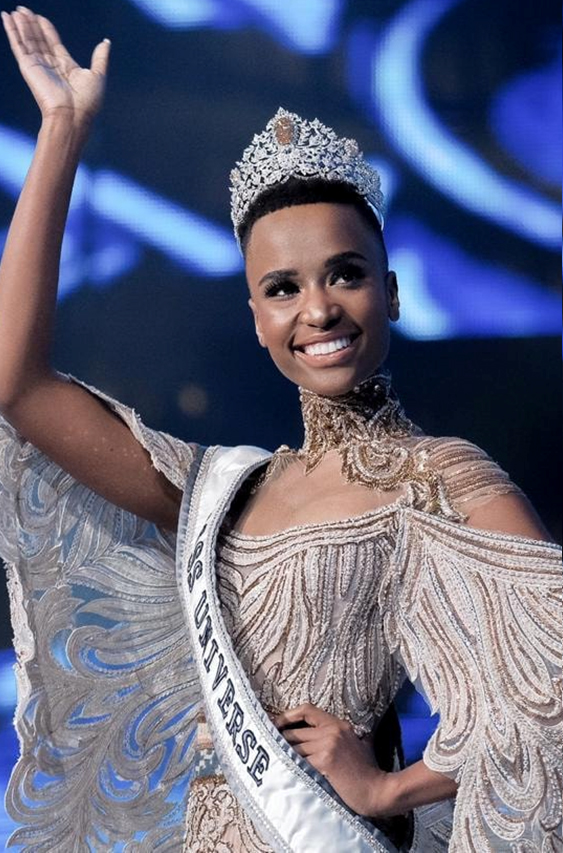
- Zozibini Tunzi, Miss South Africa 2019
- Date: 9 August 2019
- Presenters: Bonang Matheba; Liesl Laurie; Zavion Kotze
- Entertainment: Sho Madjozi; Amanda Black; Nasty C; Jesse Clegg
- Venue: Sun Arena at Time Square, Pretoria, South Africa
- Broadcaster: M-Net; DStv; Mzansi Magic; YouTube
- Entrants: 16
- Placements: 10
- Winner: Zozibini Tunzi; Eastern Cape

Miss South Africa 2019 was the 61st edition of the Miss South Africa pageant. It was held on 9 August 2019 at Sun Arena at Time Square in Pretoria, Gauteng. Tamaryn Green of Western Cape crowned her successor Zozibini Tunzi of Eastern Cape at the end of the event. Tunzi represented South Africa in Miss Universe 2019 and was crowned Miss Universe while 1st Runner-Up Sasha-Lee Olivier represented the country in Miss World 2019. Olivier assumed the title of Miss South Africa 2019 due to Tunzi winning the Miss Universe title.

== Results ==
Color keys

- The contestant Won in an International pageant.
- The contestant was a Runner-up in an International pageant.
- The contestant was a Semi-Finalist in an International pageant.
- Unplaced

| Placement | Contestant | International placement |
|---|---|---|
| Miss South Africa 2019 | Eastern Cape – Zozibini Tunzi ∞ | Miss Universe 2019 |
| Miss Universe South Africa 2019 | Eastern Cape – Zozibini Tunzi ∞ | Miss Universe 2019 |
| Runner Up | Gauteng – Sasha-Lee Olivier ∞ | Top 40 |
| Miss World South Africa 2019 | Gauteng – Sasha-Lee Olivier ∞ | Top 40 |
| Top 5 | Gauteng – Kgothatso Dithebe; Gauteng – Nompumelelo Maduna; Western Cape – Eloïse van der Westhuizen | |
| Top 10 | Eastern Cape – Sibabalwe Gcilitshana; Gauteng – Errin Brits; Gauteng – Loren Leigh Jenneker; Kwazulu-Natal – Danielle Wallace; Western Cape – Chuma Matsaluka § | |

§ Voted into Top 10 via Internet
∞ After Tunzi was crowned Miss Universe 2019, she resigned her title as Miss South Africa 2019 and Olivier replaced her as the new titleholder.

== Contestants ==
The sixteen finalists were revealed on 11 July.

| Name | Age | Province | Hometown |
|---|---|---|---|
| Beulah Baduza | 23 | Gauteng | Hatfield |
| Chuma Matsaluka | 21 | Western Cape | Nyanga |
| Danielle Wallace | 26 | KwaZulu-Natal | Umhlanga |
| Eloïse van der Westhuizen | 24 | Western Cape | Panorama |
| Errin Brits | 22 | Gauteng | Randpark Ridge |
| Keabetswe Kanyane | 25 | Gauteng | Montana Park |
| Kgothatso Dithebe | 24 | Gauteng | Centurion |
| Lisa Stoffela | 26 | KwaZulu-Natal | Margate |
| Loren Leigh Jenneker | 24 | Gauteng | Centurion |
| Noluthando Bennett | 24 | Gauteng | Kagiso |
| Nompumelelo Maduna | 24 | Gauteng | Rockville |
| Sasha-Lee Olivier | 26 | Gauteng | Alberton |
| Sibabalwe Gcilitshana | 24 | Eastern Cape | Nqamakwe |
| Xia Narain | 23 | KwaZulu-Natal | Chatsworth |
| Zanele Phakathi | 20 | Gauteng | Soweto |
| Zozibini Tunzi | 25 | Eastern Cape | Tsolo |

=== Non-finalists ===
The 35 semifinalists were selected from a record 1,886 applicants. Applications were done online, and semifinalists were selected via their social media accounts, as well as online application questions. The semifinalists were later reduced to sixteen finalists following an in-person audition in July 2019.

| Name | Age | Province | Hometown |
|---|---|---|---|
| Anarzade Omar | 20 | Gauteng | Crown Gardens |
| Anita Jansen | 22 | Gauteng | Midrand |
| Anzelle von Staden | 26 | Gauteng | Centurion |
| Catherine Groenewald | 21 | Western Cape | Constantia |
| Celest Steyn | 24 | Gauteng | Mooikloof |
| Fanelesibonge Mbuyazi | 22 | KwaZulu-Natal | KwaMsane |
| Gabrielle Lochoff | 21 | Gauteng | Mooikloof |
| Hesrie van Heerden | 23 | Western Cape | Bellville |
| Kay Leigh Sussman | 22 | Gauteng | Johannesburg |
| Kim Snyman | 26 | Gauteng | Sandton |
| Leanne Louw | 25 | Gauteng | Heidelberg |
| Lara Steenkamp | 20 | Northern Cape | Louisvale |
| Martinique Ferreira | 23 | Free State | Bloemfontein |
| Mbali Dlamini | 22 | KwaZulu-Natal | Newcastle |
| Nkosazana Sibobosi | 23 | Western Cape | Khayelitsha |
| Roelien Claasen | 23 | Gauteng | Florauna |
| Shaskia John | 21 | Gauteng | Laudium |
| Sisa Mdoda | 25 | Free State | Sasolburg |
| Tené Minderon | 21 | Gauteng | Brakpan |
| Tumelo Ntsewa | 22 | Limpopo | Polokwane |

== Judges ==
=== Semifinals ===
- Leandie du Randt – actress and motivational speaker
- Liesl Laurie – broadcaster and Miss South Africa 2015
- Andiswa Manxiwa – former runway model and casting director
- Bokang Montjane-Tshabalala – Miss South Africa 2010
- Danielle Weakley – Women's Health editor

=== Finals ===
- Connie Ferguson – Actress and businesswoman
- Catriona Gray – Miss Universe 2018 from Philippines
- Thando Hopa – Model, activist and lawyer
- Anele Mdoda – Radio jockey
- Demi-Leigh Nel-Peters – Miss Universe 2017 from South Africa
