= Thando Hopa =

South African model, activist, and lawyer

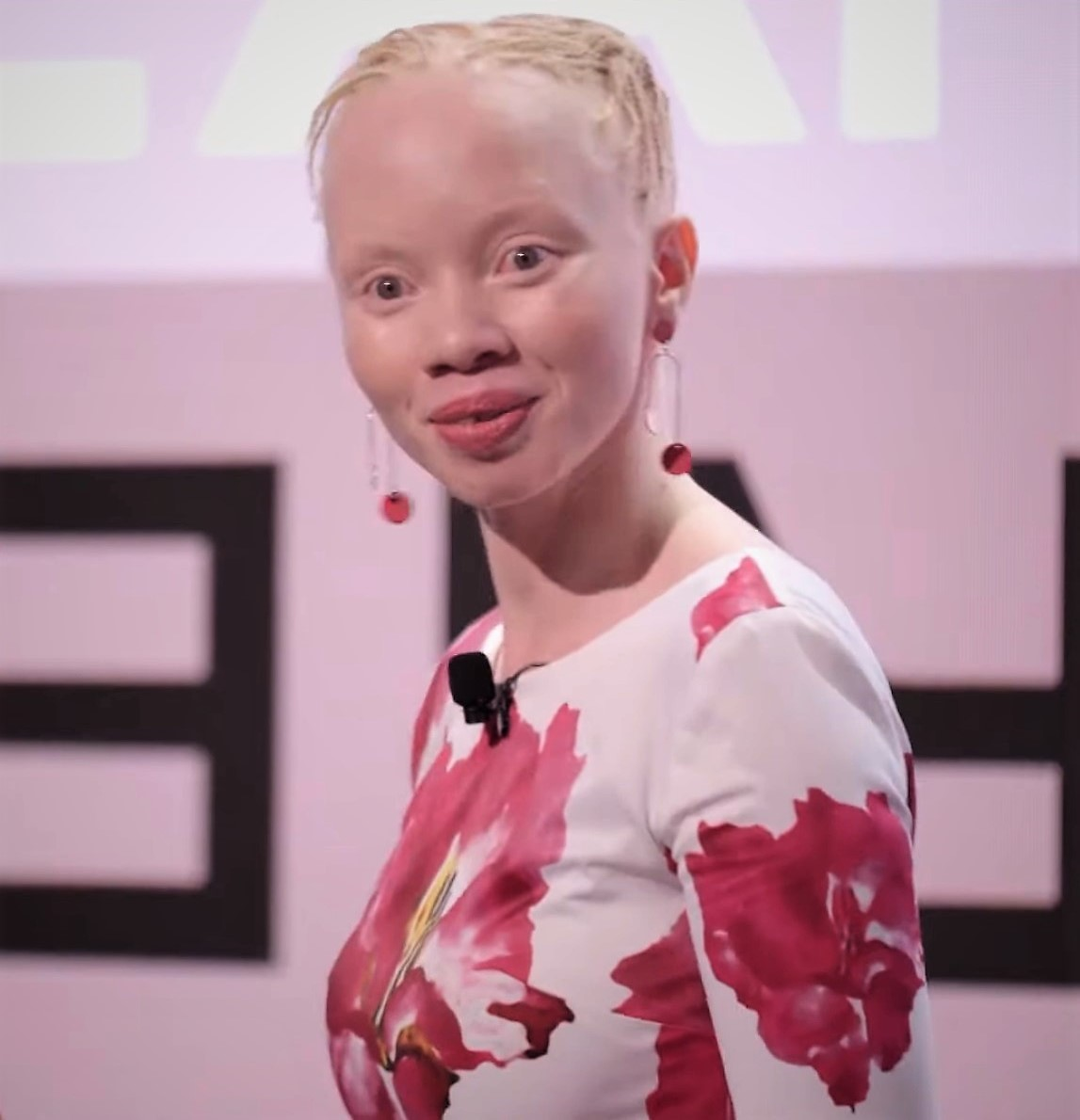
- Hopa speaks at the World Economic Forum in 2020
- Born: 1989
- Occupations: Model, activist
- Awards: 100 Women (2018)

Thando Hopa (born 1989 in Sebokeng) is a South African model, activist, entrepreneur, and lawyer. She is the first person with albinism to be featured on the cover of Vogue. In addition to modeling, Hopa has formed her own initiatives such as the African Fashion Legacy Project which highlights the history of African fashion, textiles, and weaving practices. Hopa created her own media company, Thando Hopa Media, which works to provide diverse representation across media platforms. She is an active advocate for those with albinism as a founding delegate of the Global Albinism Alliance and Vice Chairperson for the African Albinism Network. Hopa is also a public speaker who has presented at conferences around the world about the importance of inclusion and equity.

== Early years ==
Thando Hopa was born in Sebokeng, a small town in South Africa, and raised in Lenasia, a suburb in South Africa. Her father was an engineer and her mother worked as a filmmaker. She noted her childhood with her family — her parents, three siblings (one of which also has albinism), and her grandmother — as a loving and vibrant experience, however, Hopa has also expressed the struggles that she faced in childhood when it came to learning to live with albinism. During her time in public school, students bullied her about her condition, were afraid to touch her, and teased her frequently. Although teachers encouraged her parents to pull her out of mainstream schooling due to the bullying, Hopa's parents encouraged her to stay in school, which she did. Hopa shared in interviews that these incidents with students began affecting her view of herself, but her parents helped to combat the negative feelings she absorbed from her classmates by affirming her beauty, working to instill confidence in her, and ensuring that she had a safe environment at home.

Growing up, Thando Hopa expressed interest in wanting to be an actress, but her father wanted her to be an accountant instead. Hopa claimed that they compromised and decided that she would pursue law.

== Education ==
Thando Hopa's early experiences with law came in a practice called 'street law' which is when students and professionals go to smaller communities to teach them about law practices. According to Hopa, this is where her passion for community engagement and activism began to grow. Hopa received her law degree in 2011 from the University of the Witwatersrand, a public university located in Johannesburg, South Africa. At only 23 years old, Hopa was the youngest prosecutor during her intake at the National Prosecuting Authority in Johannesburg. She works as a sex offense prosecutor. In June 2024, she began the Executive MBA Candidate program at Henley Business School.

== Modeling and other public appearances ==
Hopa was scouted by popular South African fashion designer Gert-Johan Coetzee to work as a model in 2012. She expressed hesitance as she was already established as a lawyer, but she noted that her sister encouraged her to follow through on the opportunity in order to provide positive, mainstream representation of albinism for the next generation. Most notably, she was the first person with albinism to grace the cover of Vogue magazine. The Vogue Portugal cover was released in April 2019. Her other modeling campaigns include work for Audi, Marie Claire, and The Foschini Group. She was cast as the Princess of Hearts in the 2018 Pirelli Calendar, becoming the first South African person of color to appear in it. The Pirelli Calendar shoot featured an all-black cast and included stars like Lupita Nyong' and Whoopi Goldberg. Hopa stated that she aims to continue to use her modeling career to portray albinism in a positive way and act as a role model for those who look like her.

In 2018, Hopa was recognized with the 100 Women award from BBC for her diversity and inclusion advocacy. She was the only woman from South Africa to be featured on the list that year as well as the only person with albinism.

Hopa was cast as Artemis in the British-American mini-series, Troy: Fall of a City, in 2018. As a child, she was a cast member in the early seasons of Takalani Sesame (the South African co-production of Sesame Street). Her mother, Seipati Bulane-Hopa, was the executive producer of the show. Hopa was also featured in Convict Conman which was a Showmax original docu-series released in 2023 that covered the exploitation of teenage girls in the modeling industry. In 2024, Hopa made a guest appearance on season 2, episode 2 of Netflix's African drama series Savage Beauty .

Hopa formed part of the panel of judges for Miss South Africa in 2019 which culminated in the win of Zozibini Tunzi who went on to become Miss Universe later that same year.

In 2020, she became a Fellow and Cultural Leader at the World Economic Forum Narratives Lab and she was mentored by singer-songwriter, actress and activist Angélique Kidjo.

Hopa is a frequent public speaker and has made several noticeable appearances at conferences worldwide including Betazone Davos at a World Economic Forum meeting, the MAKERS Conference, SISTA Summit, the H&M Foundation, and Bloomberg LP.

== Entrepreneurship, initiatives and advocacy ==
In 2022, Hopa collaborated with mentor Angélique Kidjo, Glamour South Africa, and the World Economic Forum to launch the African Fashion Legacy Project. She explained that the idea began as a conversation she had with her mother about how rural African communities has significant impacts on fashion and culture outside of Africa. The initiative is dedicated to exploring the rich history of transcontinental African fabrics and fashion in order to promote cultural awareness about the significance of clothing in African culture and how pieces shape the story of African people. The initiative explores how African weaving practices, dyes, and fabrics reached various nations like Germany, India, and the Netherlands, as well as how African culture is still showing up in these nations and others in the present day. Hopa expressed that she also aims to use the project as a way to create a platform for marginalized groups like disabled individuals and the LGBTQIA+ community. She enlisted the help of Lebohang Monyatsi to be an advocate for the project. Monyatsi is a Miss Wheelchair World First Runner-Up and a model who was diagnosed with polio at a young age. Hopa main goal is to use the research and curated clothing designs to create unity, emphasize the diversity within African culture, and show the impact that African fashion has had worldwide.

Hopa actively participates in political and social discussions and organizations revolving around the improvement of life for those with albinism. Hopa is a delegate of the Global Albinism Alliance, an advocate for the Standing Voice Organization, and serves as the Vice Chairperson for the African Albinism Network. The Global Albinism alliance advocates for the protection and rights of those who have albinism by working to combat discrimination and societal challenges. The Alliance works to support its community through human rights advocacy, funding for skin cancer research, and promoting equal access to sunscreen. The Standing Voice Organization, a charity organization that has bases in the United Kingdom, Tanzania, and Malawi, is also dedicated to activism and fighting for the equal rights of those with albinism. Standing Voice helps to provide research funding for health effects that come with albinism like low-eyesight and help children with albinism find inclusive schools. The African Albinism Network focuses on fighting violence and healthcare discrimination that people of albinism face and has a specific thematic area focused on advocating for women with albinism.

== See also ==
- Albinism in popular culture
