= Jihane Almira Chedid =

Indonesian People's Consultative Assembly Ambassador, actress, model

- ꦗꦶꦲꦤ꧀ꦄꦭ꧀ꦩꦶꦫꦖꦼꦢꦶꦢ꧀
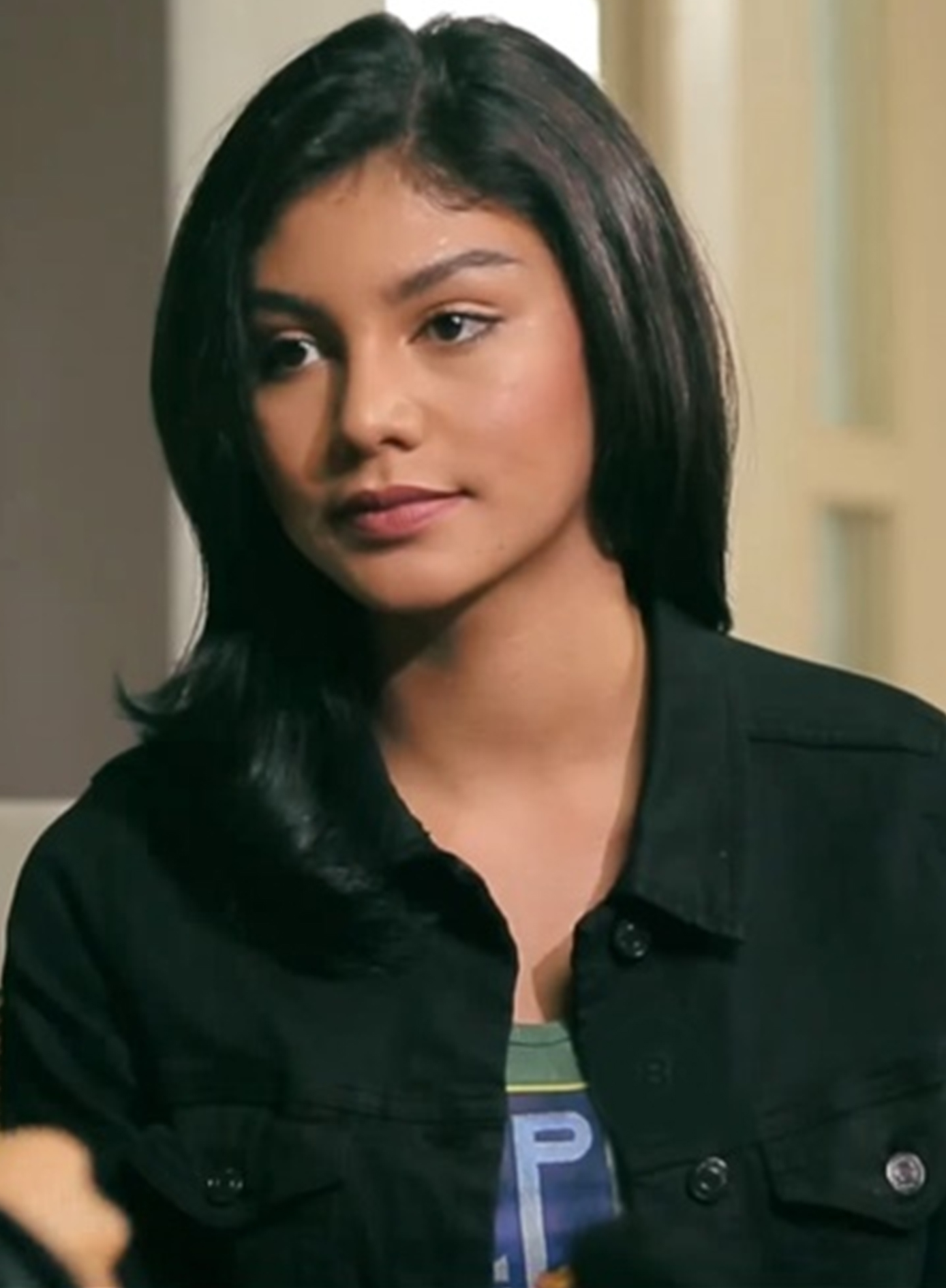
- Chedid in 2016
- Born: Jihane Almira Chedid; February 4, 2000 (age 26); Semarang, Central Java, Indonesia
- Education: Singapore Intercultural School Bona Vista; Universitas PGRI Semarang; Bina Nusantara University
- Occupations: Actress; model
- Height: 175 cm (5 ft 9 in)
- Beauty pageant titleholder
- Title: Puteri Indonesia Jawa Tengah 2020; Puteri Indonesia Pariwisata 2020; Miss Supranational Indonesia 2021; Miss Supranational Asia 2021
- Major competitions: Puteri Indonesia Jawa Tengah 2020; (Winner); Puteri Indonesia 2020; (2nd Runner-up – Puteri Indonesia Pariwisata 2020); Miss Supranational 2021; (Top 12)

Signature
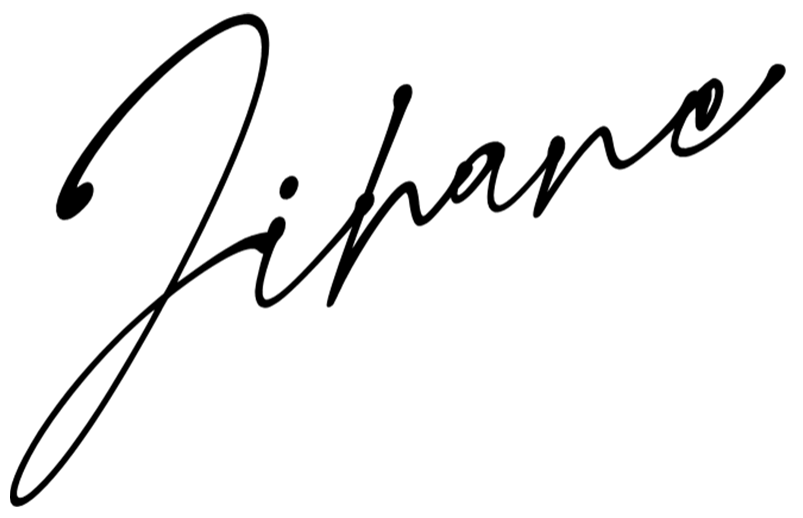

Jihane Almira Chedid (Hanacaraka: ꦗꦶꦲꦤ꧀ꦄꦭ꧀ꦩꦶꦫꦖꦼꦢꦶꦢ꧀, Arabic: جيهان الميرا شديد; Arabic pronunciation: [ʒiˈhaːn al.miˈraː ʃaˈdiːd]; born February 4, 2000) is an Indonesian People's Consultative Assembly Ambassador, actress, fashion model and beauty pageant titleholder who won the title of Puteri Indonesia Pariwisata 2020. She is known for her work in advocating for #ActYourThoughts orphanage programs. Chedid is the first contestant from Central Java to be crowned Puteri Indonesia Pariwisata. She represented Indonesia at Miss Supranational 2021 held in Poland, and was crowned Miss Supranational Asia 2021, also winning the Best National Costume and Miss Supra Fan-Vote awards.

== Early life and education ==
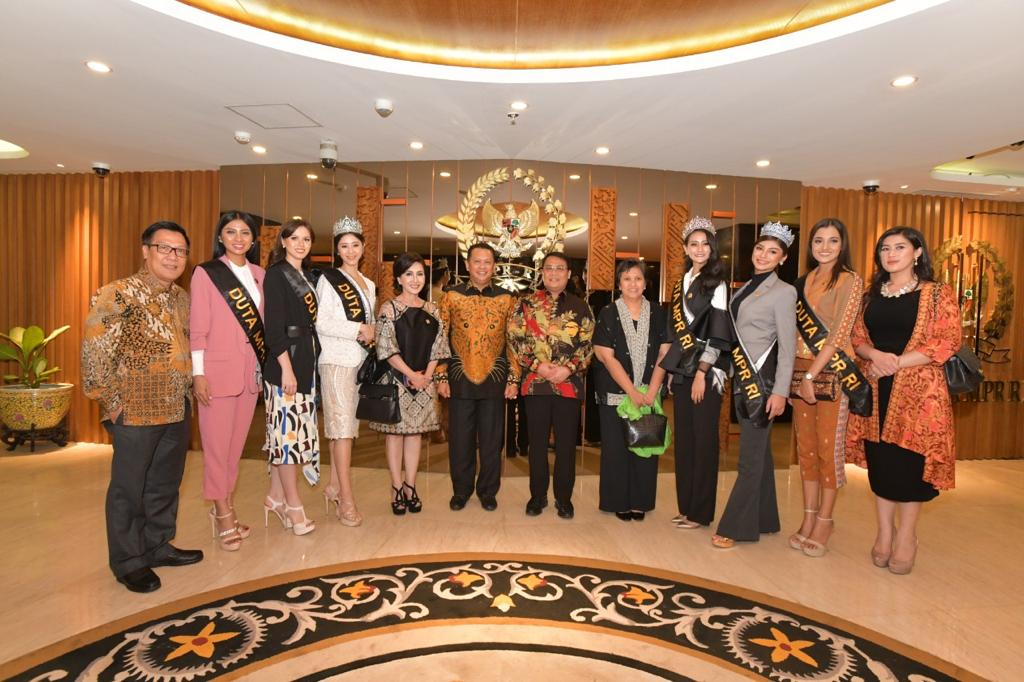
Chedid with the other People's Consultative Assembly Ambassadors

Chedid was born in Semarang, Central Java, Indonesia to a Lebanese father, Jihad Chedid, and Javanese mother, Neneng (Nancy) Wulandari Chedid. When she was 12 years old, she worked as an actress and fashion model in Jakarta. She attended high school at Singapore Intercultural School, Bona Vista. She holds a Bachelor of Science in Information Technology from PGRI Semarang University and continued her study of graphic design at the Bina Nusantara University – Jakarta. On 12 March 2020, together with Puteri Indonesia 2020-Ayu Maulida Putri and Puteri Indonesia Lingkungan 2020-Putu Ayu Saraswati, the Puteri Indonesia 2020 winners including Chedid were named People's Consultative Assembly Ambassadors by the Speaker, Bambang Soesatyo. She represented Indonesia in several international competitions, including Guess Girl Search South East Asia 2015 together with Puteri Indonesia 2017 - Bunga Jelitha Ibrani, and Nylon magazine face off 2016.

== Pageantry ==
=== Puteri Central Java 2020 ===
Chedid joined the contest at the provincial level of the Puteri Central Java 2020, and was chosen as the winner of Puteri Central Java 2020, where she also won "Miss Congeniality" special award.

=== Puteri Indonesia 2020 ===
After qualifying the provincial title of Puteri Indonesia Central Java 2020, Chedid represented the province of Central Java in the national beauty contest, Puteri Indonesia 2020, which was held on March 6, 2020.

She was crowned as the winner of Puteri Indonesia Pariwisata 2020 (Miss Supranational Indonesia 2020) by the predecessor of Puteri Indonesia Pariwisata 2019 and Miss Supranational 2019 second runner-up Jesica Fitriana Martasari of West Java. and won "Best Evening Gown" and "1st Runner-up Miss Talent" special awards. The final coronation night was graced by the reigning Miss Supranational 2019, Anntonia Porsild and Miss Supranational 2017, Jenny Kim as the guest star.

During final statement-speech session, Chedid successfully raised her charity foundation called #ActYourThoughts movement, which a Women's empowerment platform across the islands of Indonesia that provide orphanage-elderly care and free healthcare programs. Chedid said:

"Every human being has an in-depth value and it is not revoke despair or become a mere of satisfaction, success may come by luck but it is not something to rely on, because whenever success and luck is defeated by underestimation and determination, it won't mean a thing. So set your goals, find your trigger, #ActYourThoughts and score it. Thank You..."

— "Puteri Indonesia 2020, Top 11 Speech Competition (HD) from 4:30-5:00", YouTube

=== Miss Supranational 2021 ===
As the winner of Puteri Indonesia Pariwisata 2020, Chedid will represent Indonesia at the 12th edition of Miss Supranational 2021 pageant, held on 21 August 2021 at Strzelecki Park Amphitheater, Nowy Sącz, Małopolska, Poland. Chedid competed with the other 57 countries, by the end of the event, Jihane ended up as one of the Top 12 finalists (ranked sixth) and automatically crowned as Miss Supranational Asia 2021. Jihane successfully continuing the streak of Indonesia's semi-finalists placement in Miss Supranational for the five consecutive years since 2015. The pageant was aired on Metro TV Indonesia Network. At the finale coronation night, Jihane also won several awards, She is winning "Supra Fan-Vote" award, by that Jihane automatically advanced to the Top 12 semifinalists, and she also won "Miss Congeniality" special award.

During the pre-pageant challenge events Chedid won several awards, advanced to the semifinals of "Supra Chat with Anntonia Porsild" by winning group 4 deep interview. and she is also nominated as one of the Top 11 of "Miss Elegance". Chedid won the "Best National Costume" competition held on 19 August 2021 with her Sumba Equus caballus-inspired ensemble national costume, becoming the fourth Indonesian to win the award, after Lily Estelita Liana in 2014, Gresya Amanda Maaliwuga in 2015 and Wilda Octaviana Situngkir in 2018.

Chedid brought a national costume weighed 21 kg (46 lb) with Sumba Island Equus caballus-inspired ensemble, Equus caballus is a Savannah horses that is endemic to the Indonesian islands of Sumba - Lesser Sunda Islands, that has lived since a million years ago, the costume named "The Dashing Of Equus caballus" was designed by Jember Fashion Carnival. The costume also features Mamuli and Marangga, precious gold ornaments with 10.000 rhinestones beading that wore by the Anakalang Queens of Sumba.

During the preliminary competition, Chedid appeared in a US$45.000 gold dress designed by Hollywood fashion designer Monica Ivena, at the evening gown competition. The gown, named "Golden Resilience" was decorated with thousands of Swarovski crystals inspired by Jihane's bright and confident personality.

== Filmography ==
Chedid has appeared in several television and cinema films, since her debut as an actress in 2012.

=== Cinema films ===
Year	Title	Role	Genre	Production	Ref.
2017	My Generation	as Rossy	teen drama	IFI Sinema	
2017	Ayat-Ayat Cinta 2	as Clara	religious-melodrama	MD Entertainment; MD Pictures	
2018	Ananta	as Tiara	novel based-drama	MD Entertainment; MD Pictures	
2018	DOA: Cari Jodoh	as Yuli	comedy-romance	MD Entertainment; MD Pictures	
2019	Mendadak Kaya	as Yuli	comedy-drama	MD Entertainment; MD Pictures	
2022	How Are You, Really?	as Mirah	Romance-drama	KlikFilm Productions, Falcon Pictures	
2024	The Architecture of Love	Erin			
2025	The Most Beautiful Girl in the World				

=== Television ===
Year	Title	Role	Genre	Film Production	Network	Ref.
2013-2016	Lintas Imaji	as Jihane	fantasy-mystery show	Netmediatama	NET.TV	
2017	Boy	as Dara	musical-comedy drama (soap opera)	SinemArt	SCTV	
2018-2019	Cinta Misteri	as Fallen	soap opera-romance drama	SinemArt	SCTV	
2019	Cinta Buta	as Melly Aryani	soap opera-romance drama	SinemArt	SCTV	
2020	Gossip Girl Indonesia Season-1	as Blair Hadiningrat	teen drama	GoPlay Original; Kalyana Shira Films	GoPlay	
2021	Sianida	as Amelia	reality crime-thriller (based on the murder of Wayan Mirna Salihin)	Multivision Plus	We TV, Iflix, Netflix	
2022	My New Rules of Journey	as Jihane	reality	Rapi Films	Vidio, Iflix, Netflix	
2022	Daniel & Nicolette	as Miranda	romance-drama	Screenplay Films, Wattpad	Vidio, Iflix, Netflix	
2022	Suka Duka Berduka	as Naumi	comedy-drama	Kalyana Shira Films, Rapi Films	Vidio, Iflix, Netflix	
TBA	Gossip Girl Indonesia Season-2	as Blair Hadiningrat	teen drama	GoPlay Original; Kalyana Shira Films	GoPlay	

Awards and achievements
Preceded by Pratiwi Hidayasari	Puteri Central Java; 2020	Succeeded by Catherine Widya Putri Stumer
Preceded by Jesica Fitriana (West Java)	Puteri Indonesia Pariwisata; 2020	Succeeded by Adinda Cresheilla (East Java)
Preceded by Nguyễn Thị Ngọc Châu	Miss Supranational Asia; 2021	Succeeded by Ritika Khatnani
