= Ayu Saraswati =

Indonesian People's Consultative Assembly, Medical Practitioner

- ᬧᬸᬢᬸᬅᬬᬸᬲᬭᬲ᭄ᬯᬢᬶ
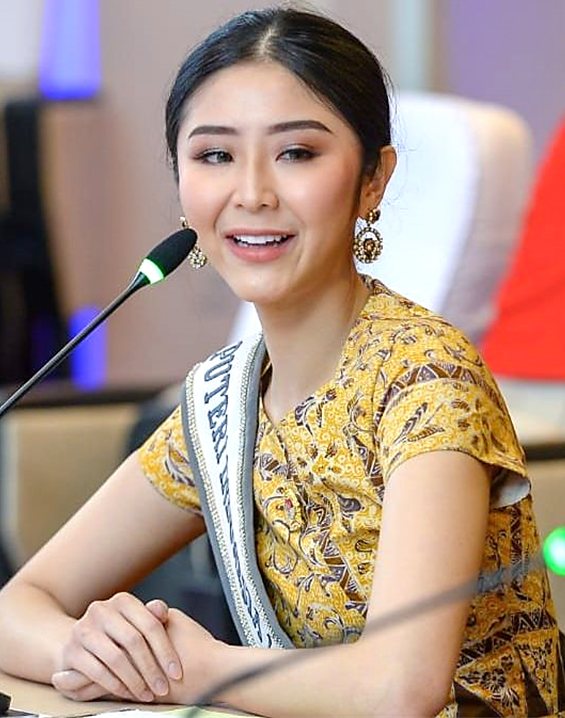
- Ayu Saraswati speaking in support as the Indonesian People's Consultative Assembly Ambassador
- Born: Putu Ayu Saraswati; July 6, 1997 (age 29); Denpasar, Bali, Indonesia
- Other names: Ayu Saraswati; Ayusa
- Education: Udayana University, Denpasar (MMSc in Biomedical sciences) Bali International Green School (primary-secondary)
- Occupations: Indonesian People's Consultative Assembly Ambassador; medical practitioner; model; beauty pageant titleholder
- Height: 173 cm (5 ft 8 in)
- Beauty pageant titleholder
- Title: Puteri Indonesia Bali 2020; Puteri Indonesia Lingkungan 2020; Miss Indonesia 2022
- Hair color: Black
- Eye color: Dark brown
- Major competitions: Puteri Indonesia Bali 2020; (Winner); Puteri Indonesia 2020; (1st Runner-up – Puteri Indonesia Lingkungan 2020); Miss International 2022; (Withdrew)

Signature
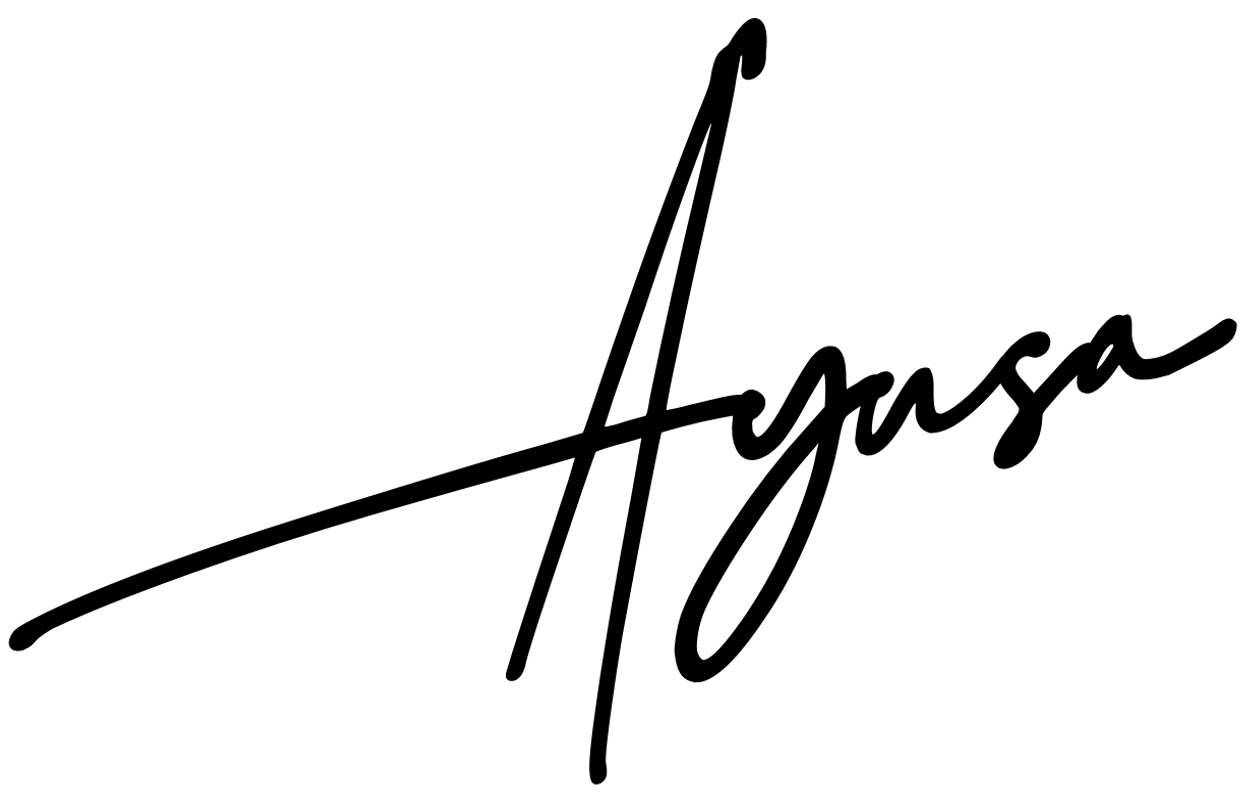

Putu Ayu Saraswati (Note: Indonesian pronunciation: [ˌpu.t̪u ˌa.ju ˌsa.raˈswa.t̪i]) (Balinese: ᬧᬸᬢᬸᬅᬬᬸᬲᬭᬲ᭄ᬯᬢᬶ. Born July 6, 1997) popularly known as Ayu Saraswati is an Indonesian People's Consultative Assembly Ambassador, medical practitioner, fashion model and beauty pageant titleholder who won the title of Puteri Indonesia Lingkungan 2020. Since 2020, she serves as the Ambassador and Advisory Council of Ministry of Women Empowerment and Child Protection of The Republic of Indonesia and Ministry of Environment and Forestry of the Republic of Indonesia, that works for #SangGuruKehidupan in advocating for women's empowerment, child protection, elderly care, natural disaster and free healthcare programs. Ayu Saraswati is the second delegate from Bali to ever be crowned Puteri Indonesia Lingkungan after Ayu Diandra Sari Tjakra in 2009. She was expected to represent Indonesia at Miss International 2022, but she withdrew from the competition.

== Early life and education ==
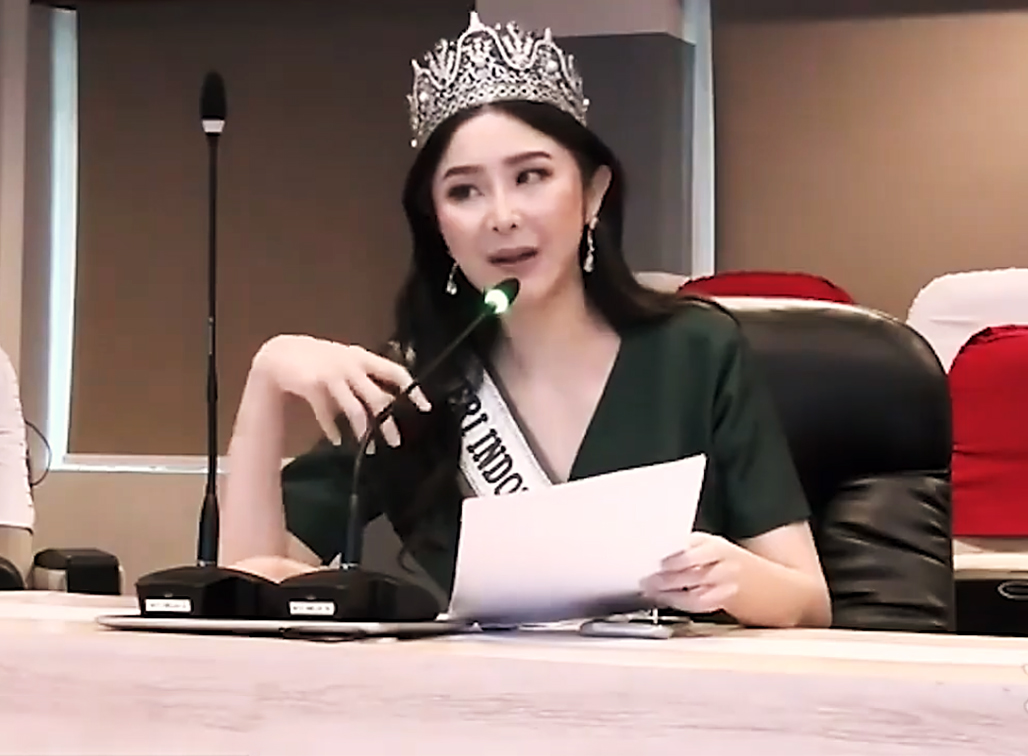
Ayu Saraswati, as the Indonesian People's Consultative Assembly Ambassador, speaks at a news conference of Ministry of Environment and Forestry of the Republic of Indonesia on 20 May 2021.

Ayu Saraswati was born in Denpasar, Bali, Indonesia to a Balinese father and Taiwanese mother. Since she was 14 years old, Ayu Saraswati is working as a fashion model and pilates instructor. She holds a Master of Medical Science (MMSc) in Biomedical sciences from the Faculty of Medicine of Udayana University, Denpasar – Bali, and currently works as a Medical Practitioner in Sanglah Hospital, where both of her parents work as a Medical Doctor.

Beside being chosen as Indonesian People's Consultative Assembly Ambassador, Ministry of Women Empowerment and Child Protection of The Republic of Indonesia Ambassador, and Ministry of Environment and Forestry of the Republic of Indonesia Ambassador. Ayu Saraswati has often represented Indonesia at international forums such as Youth Gathering Sunburst Youth Camp 2014 in Singapore and the 2013 International Community Development and Global Creative Leadership Summit in New Delhi, India.

== Pageantry ==
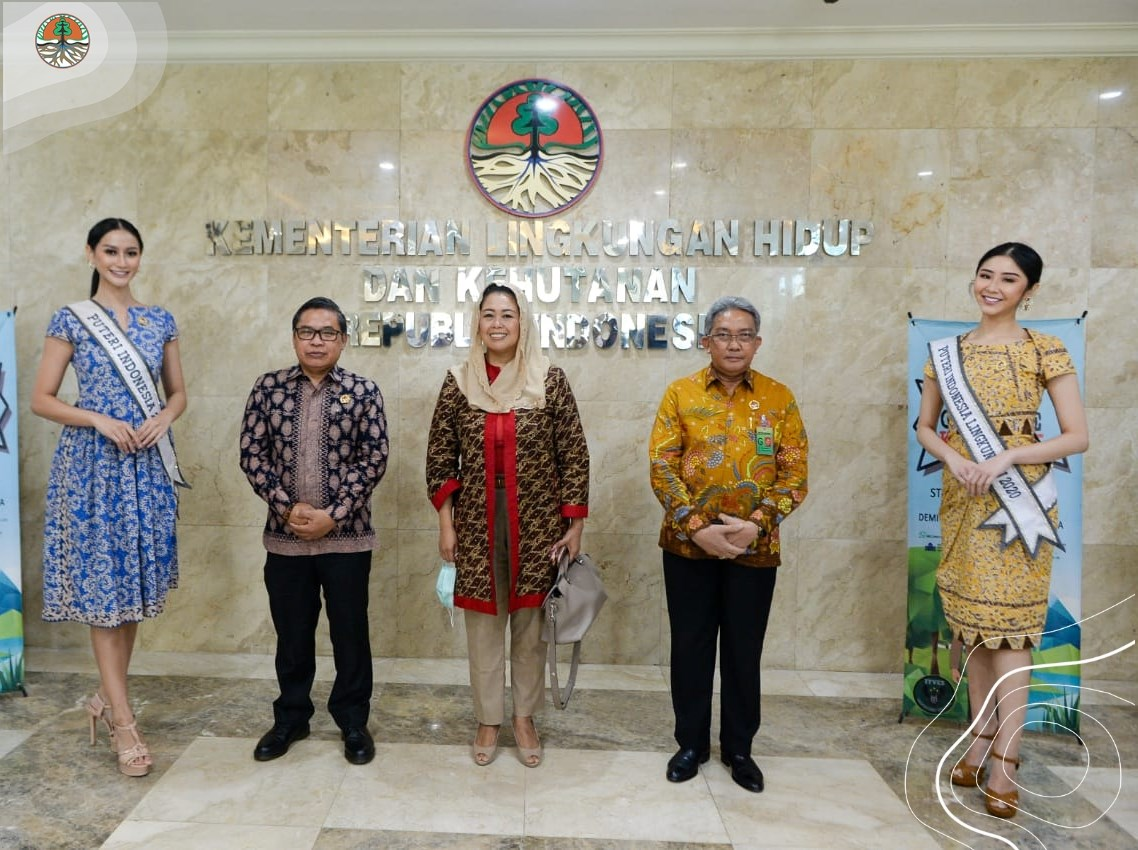
Ayu Saraswati (right) as a speaker of The Ministry of Environment and Forestry of the Republic of Indonesia press conference on 19 August 2020.

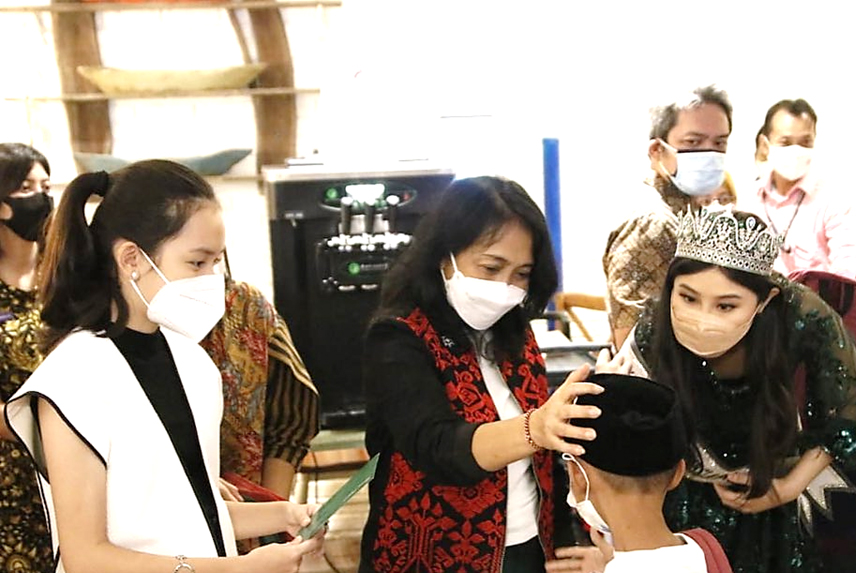
Ayu Saraswati (right) as the Ministry of Women Empowerment and Child Protection of The Republic of Indonesia Ambassador during The Youth Seminar and Press Conference at Jakarta Aquarium and Safari on 2 May 2021.

=== Jegeg Bali 2015 ===
Her foray into the world of pageantry began in 2015 when she won Jegeg Bali (Miss Tourism in Bali), where held in Denpasar at the age of eighteen, This also began her charitable activities which she continues to perform to this day.

As Jegeg Bali 2015 she became a charity ambassador for a local non-profit organization (NPO) Smile Foundation of Bali for the past 6 years, Ayu Saraswati donating funds and goods annually, helping to cleft lip and cleft palate patients and witnessed first-hand a Palatoplasty cleft surgery.

=== Puteri Bali 2020 ===
Ayu Saraswati joined the contest at the provincial level of the Puteri Indonesia Bali 2020, and ended up was chosen as the winner of Puteri Indonesia Bali 2020, where she also won "Miss Intelligence" special award.

=== Puteri Indonesia 2020 ===
After qualifying the provincial title of Puteri Indonesia Bali 2020, Ayu Saraswati represented the province of Bali in the national beauty contest, Puteri Indonesia 2020, which was held on March 6, 2020.

She was successfully crowned as the winner of Puteri Indonesia Lingkungan 2020 (Miss International Indonesia 2020). by the predecessor of Puteri Indonesia Lingkungan 2019 and Miss International 2019 Top 8 Finalist Jolene Marie Cholock-Rotinsulu of North Sulawesi. and won "Puteri Indonesia Nusa-Bali Islands 2020" special awards. The final coronation night was graced by the reigning Miss International 2019, Sireethorn Leearamwat and Miss International 2017, Kevin Lilliana Junaedy as the guest star.

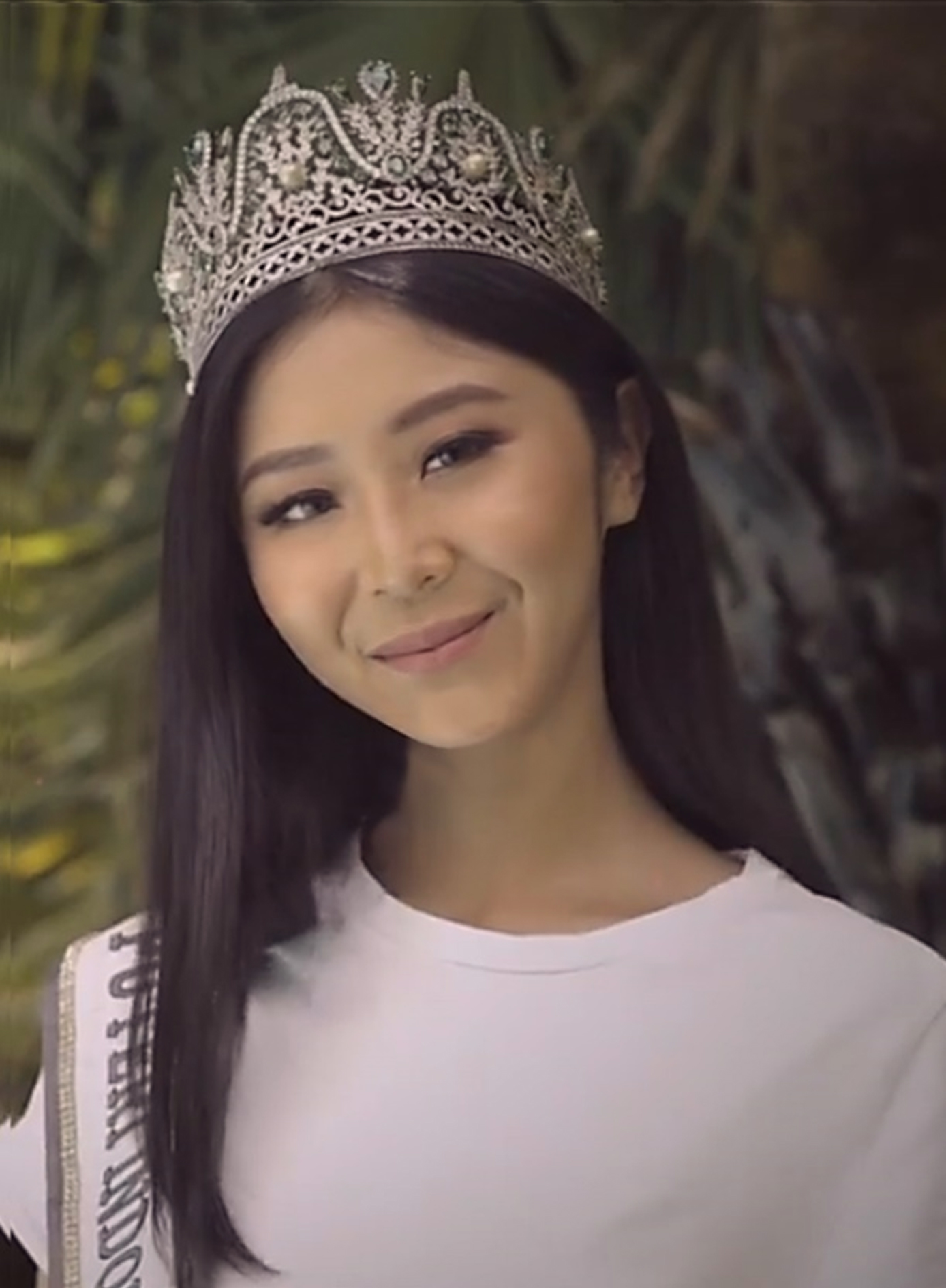
Ayu Saraswati on a 2020 Ministry of Women Empowerment and Child Protection TV-commercial - "Inspirational Women" on 24 December 2020

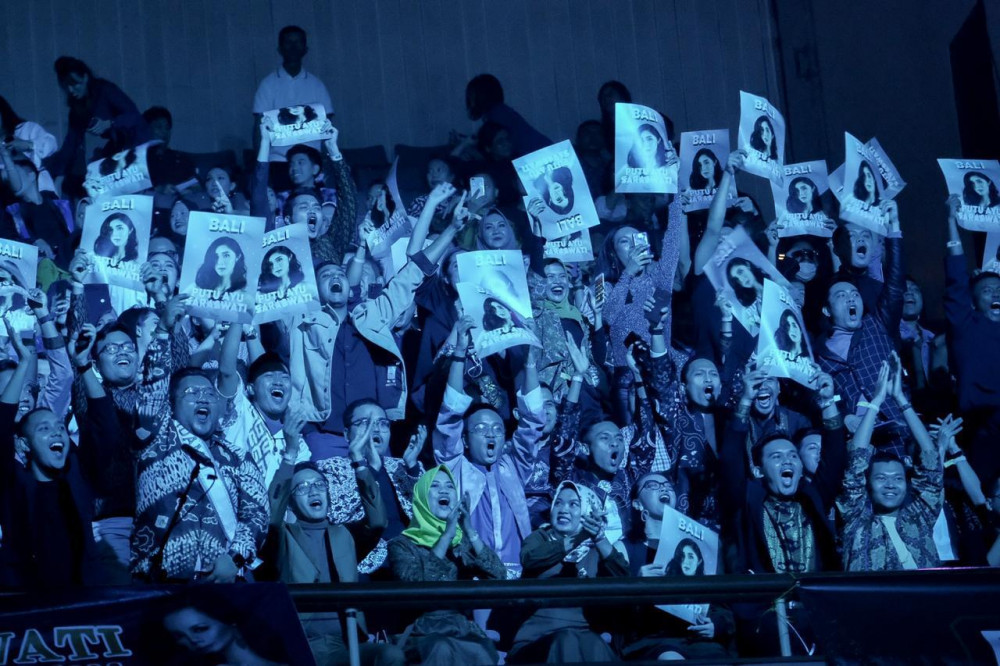
Indonesian pageant-lover supporting and holding Ayu Saraswati picture, as she competed in Puteri Indonesia 2020.

Ayu Saraswati successfully raised her charity foundation called #SangGuruKehidupan, which a Women's empowerment platform across the islands of Indonesia that provide child protection, elderly care and free healthcare programs. Saraswati said:

"Bali and my 38 other confidently beautiful woman can stand on this stage tonight, because some women fought for our rights to pursue our education and our future. Sadly not all are as lucky, to my sisters out there who are still denied of their rights, silenced and abused. Please speak up, because we hear you and we are here for you and it is our turn to fight for you..."

— Top 11 Speech Competition

=== Miss International 2022 ===
As the winner of Puteri Indonesia Lingkungan 2020, Saraswati was expected to represent Indonesia at the 60th edition of the Miss International pageant, scheduled to be held in December 2022 at Pacifico Yokohama in Yokohama, Kanagawa Prefecture, Japan. At the end of the event, Miss International 2019, Sireethorn Leearamwat of Thailand, was to crown her successor. However, during the Puteri Indonesia 2022 competition, Saraswati announced her withdrawal from Miss International 2022 and was replaced by Cindy May McGuire as Indonesia's representative.

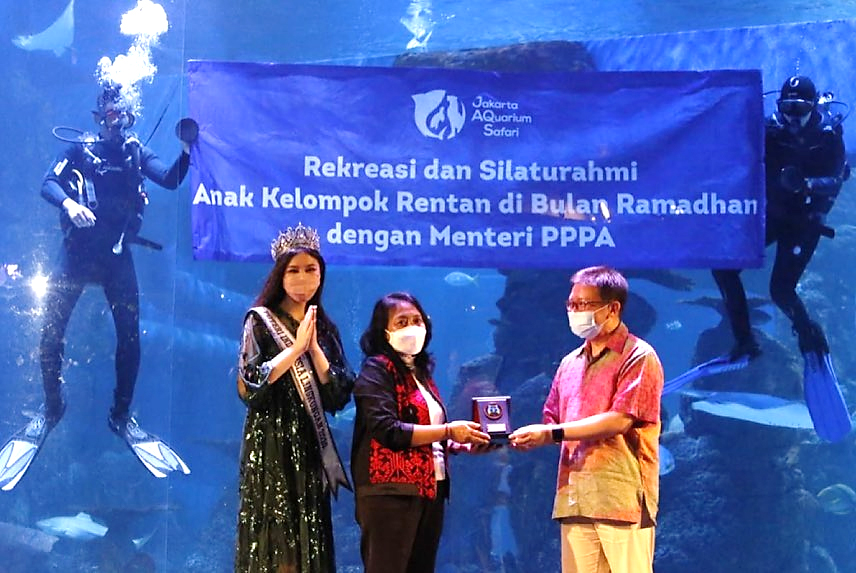
Ayu Saraswati (left) as the Ministry of Women Empowerment and Child Protection of The Republic of Indonesia Ambassador together with Minister Of Women I Gusti Ayu Bintang Darmawati (center), during The Youth Seminar and Press Conference at Jakarta Aquarium and Safari on 2 May 2021.

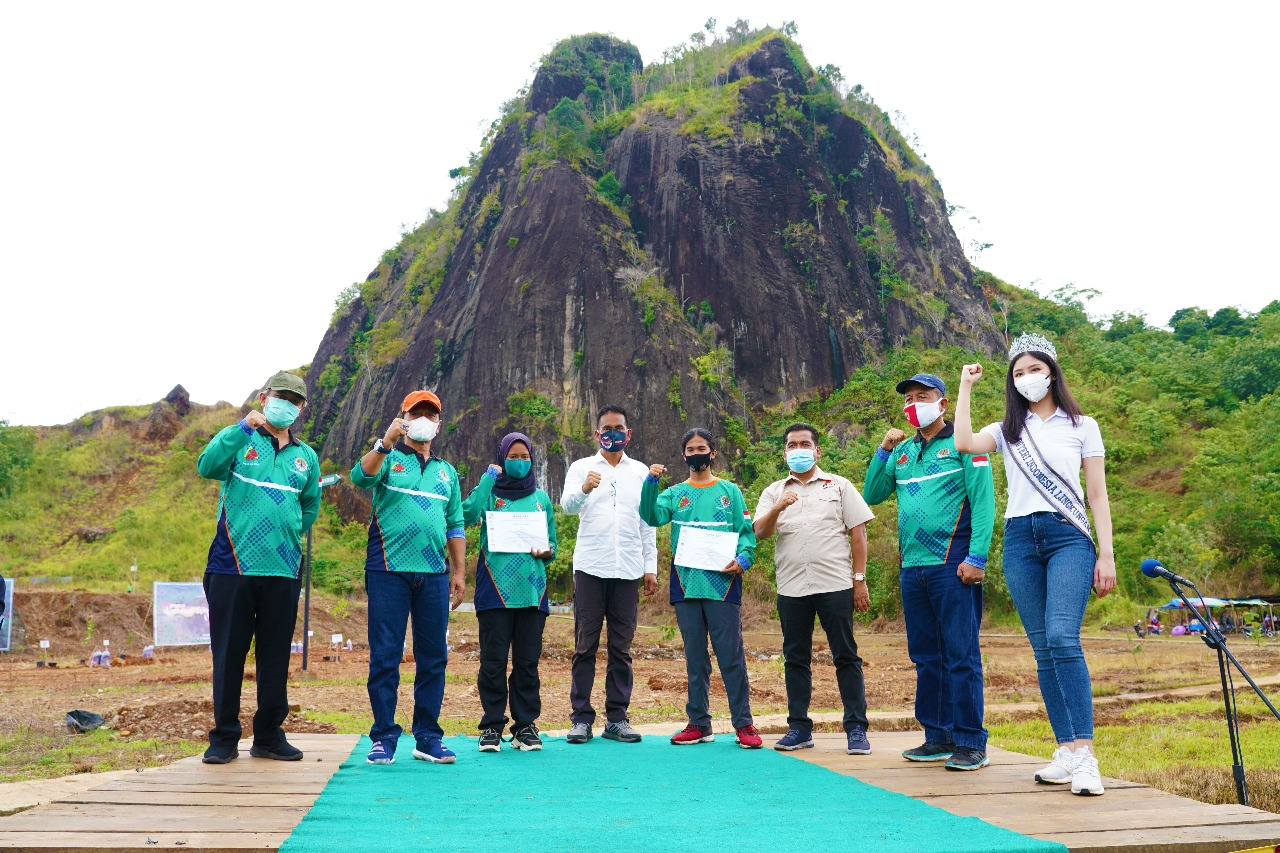
Ayu Saraswati (right) speak in support for the campaign of The Ministry of Environment and Forestry of the Republic of Indonesia press conference on 5 September 2020.

== See also ==
- Puteri Indonesia 2020
- Miss International 2022
- Raden Roro Ayu Maulida Putri
- Jihane Almira Chedid

== Notes ==
Awards and achievements
Preceded by Nadia Karina Wijaya	Puteri Bali; 2020	Succeeded by Laksmi Shari De-Neefe Suardana
Preceded by Jolene Marie Rotinsulu (North Sulawesi)	Puteri Indonesia Lingkungan; 2020	Succeeded by Cindy May McGuire (Jakarta SCR 5)
