= Miss South Africa 2017 =

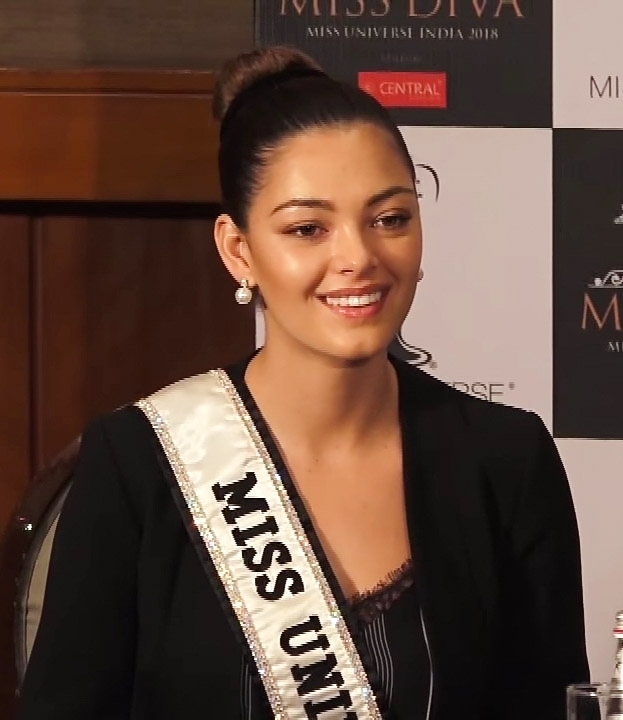
- Demi-Leigh Nel-Peters, Miss South Africa 2017
- Date: March 26, 2017
- Presenters: ProVerb; Co Host: Lalla Hirayama
- Entertainment: Da L.E.S feat. Gemini Major; ChianoSky; DJ Kent; Nandi; Ziyun; Dominic; Thami; Lira
- Venue: Sun City Superbowl, Rustenburg, South Africa
- Broadcaster: M-Net; DStv; Mzansi Magic
- Entrants: 26
- Placements: 12
- Winner: Demi-Leigh Nel-Peters Western Cape

Miss South Africa 2017 was the 59th edition of the Miss South Africa pageant, held at the Sun City Superbowl in Rustenburg, on March 26, 2017.

It was simulcast as a live broadcast on M-Net and Mzansi Magic. Twenty six semi-finalists from different provinces were selected from over nine hundred women who entered, but only 12 finalists competed for the crown. Demi Leigh Nel-Peters emerged victorious and was named as Miss SA 2017 at the conclusion of the 2 hour event. Demi-Leigh represented South Africa at Miss Universe 2017 and was crowned as the new Miss Universe. Her 1st princess Adè van Heerden competed at Miss World 2017, finishing in Top 10.

== Judges ==
Six celebrity judges, from the industries of fashion, sport, pageantry and entertainment, together with a public vote, decided the winner of Miss South Africa 2017.

1. Bridget Masinga

2. Cameron van den Berg

3. Miss SA 2004, Claudia Henkel

4. Unathi Msangena

5. Maps Maponyane

6. Gisele Aymes

7. South African Public Voting

== Public Voting ==
The South African public was invited to be the 7th judge, their vote counting for 25% of the overall score.

South Africans voted via text with the assistance of pageant sponsor Cell C.

During the Live telecast, the top six were announced in random order. The recipients were:

1. Odirile (Top 8)

2. Nicole (Top 8)

3. Shelbe (did not advance)

4. Adé (1st runner up)

5. Sháne Naidoo (Top 5)

6. Demi-Leigh (Winner)

Boipelo managed to secure 2nd-runner up, and Priyeshka made the Top 5 despite being snubbed by the South African public vote. Hot press favourite, Shelbe failed to make the first live cut.

== Results ==
=== Placements ===
- The contestant Won in an International pageant.
- The contestant was a Runner-up in an International pageant.
- The contestant was a Semi-Finalist in an International pageant.
- Unplaced

Placement	Candidate	International Placement
Miss South Africa 2017	Western Cape − Demi-Leigh Nel-Peters ∞	Miss Universe 2017
Miss Universe South Africa 2017	Western Cape − Demi-Leigh Nel-Peters ∞	Miss Universe 2017
1st Princess	Western Cape − Adè van Heerden ∞	Top 10
Miss World South Africa 2017	Western Cape − Adè van Heerden ∞	Top 10
2nd Princess	Gauteng − Boipelo Mabe	
Top 5	Gauteng − Priyeshka Lutchman; Gauteng − Shané Naidoo	
Top 8	Gauteng − Iman Mkwanazi; Gauteng − Nicole van Niekerk; Gauteng − Odirile Sepeng	
Top 12	Gauteng − Nompumelelo Mampholo; KwaZulu-Natal − Kayla Malherbe; Gauteng − Shelbe Pretorius; Gauteng − Yuta Raubenheimer	

∞ Nel-Peters won Miss Universe 2017. Due to protocol, Nel-Peters resigned her title as Miss South Africa 2017, and the 1st Princess, Adè van Heerden, replaced her as Miss South Africa.

== Contestants ==
Contestant	Age	Province	Hometown
Adè van Heerden	25	Western Cape	Herolds Bay
Boipelo Mabe	23	Gauteng	Alexandra
Callie-Jo Bouman	22	Western Cape	Bellville
Chante Clair Holloway	22	Western Cape	Atlantis
Demi-Leigh Nel-Peters	21	Western Cape	Sedgefield
Devoney Crossman	24	Gauteng	Greenstone Hill
Iman Mkwanazi	26	Gauteng	Lenasia
Jessica Tovey	23	Gauteng	Randpark Ridge
Kayla Malherbe	21	KwaZulu-Natal	Mtunzini
Keipeile Raisibe Dintoe	25	Gauteng	Pretoria
Lou-Marie Taljaard	23	Western Cape	Bellville
Michelle Kruger	21	Gauteng	Pretoria
Milanie Cilliers	22	Polokwane	Limpopo
Nicole van Niekerk	26	Gauteng	Moregloed
Nompumelelo Mampholo	20	Gauteng	Johannesburg
Ntombikayise Msimango	21	Gauteng	Johannesburg
Odirile Sepeng	23	Gauteng	Pretoria
Olin-Shae de la Cruz	22	Gauteng	Johannesburg
Priyeshka Lutchman	24	Gauteng	Rosebank
Saskia Wagner	18	Gauteng	Johannesburg
Shané Naidoo	24	Gauteng	Benoni
Shelbe Pretorius	23	Gauteng	Krugersdorp
Shenai Bridglall	22	KwaZulu-Natal	Port Shepstone
Tshegofatso Monggae	23	Gauteng	Dobsonville
Yuta Raubenheimer	25	Gauteng	Pretoria
Zozibini Tunzi	23	Eastern Cape	Tsolo
