= Ayu Maulida =

Indonesian model and ambassador (born 1997)

Raden Roro Ayu Maulida Putri
- ꦄꦪꦸꦩꦻꦴꦭꦶꦢꦥꦸꦠꦿꦶ
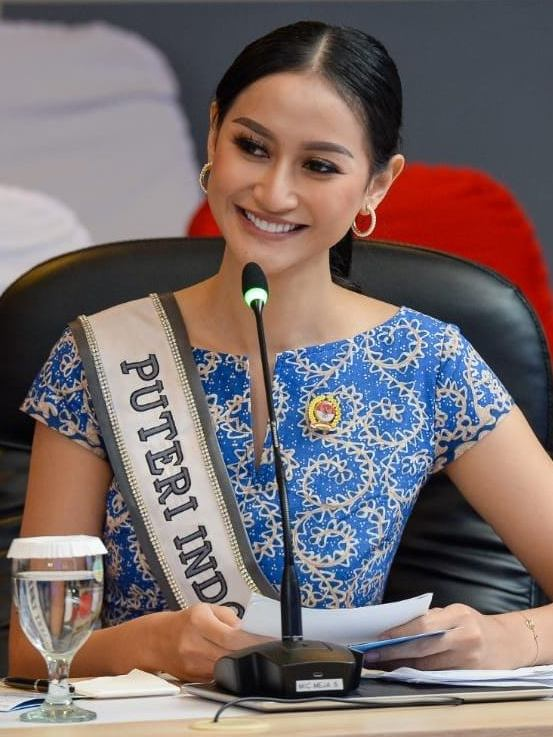
- Maulida speaking as the Indonesian People's Consultative Assembly Ambassador
- Born: Raden Roro Ayu Maulida Putri; July 11, 1997 (age 29); Surabaya, East Java, Indonesia
- Other names: Ayu Maulida; Ayuma
- Education: Airlangga University
- Occupations: Indonesian People's Consultative Assembly Ambassador; National Head of Communication of the Indonesian COVID-19 Response Acceleration Task Force, model; beauty pageant titleholder
- Height: 1.79 m (5 ft 10 1/2 in)
- Beauty pageant titleholder
- Title: Face of Asia 2019; Puteri Indonesia Jawa Timur 2020; Puteri Indonesia 2020; Miss Universe Indonesia 2020
- Hair color: Dark brown
- Eye color: Dark brown
- Major competitions: Puteri Indonesia Jawa Timur 2017; (1st Runner-up); Face of Asia 2019; (Winner); Puteri Indonesia Jawa Timur 2020; (Winner); Puteri Indonesia 2020; (Winner); Miss Universe 2020; (Top 21)

Signature
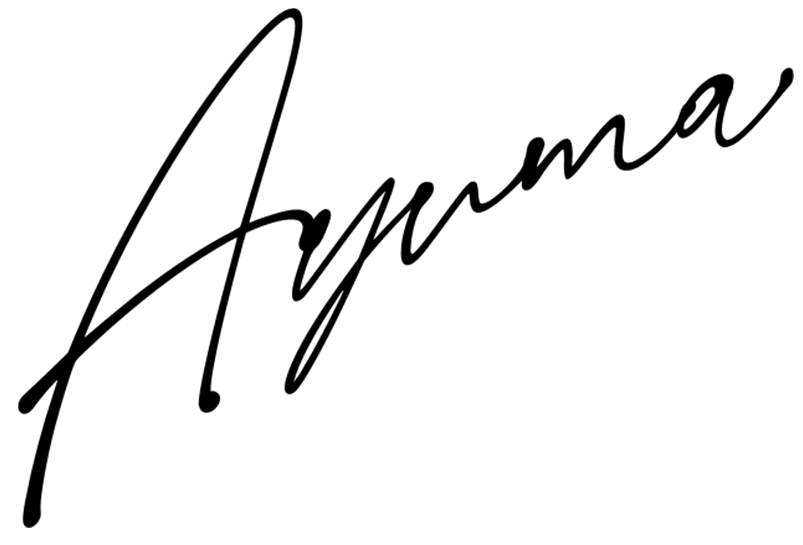

Raden Roro Ayu Maulida Putri (Javanese: ꦫꦢꦺꦤ꧀ꦫꦺꦴꦫꦺꦴꦄꦪꦸꦩꦻꦴꦭꦶꦢꦥꦸꦠꦿꦶ; born July 11, 1997) is an Indonesian fashion model and beauty pageant titleholder who won the title of Puteri Indonesia 2020. She is the third delegate from East Java to win the title. During her reign, she also served as an Indonesian People's Consultative Assembly Ambassador as well as the National Head of Communication of the Indonesian COVID-19 Response Acceleration Task Force.

She represented Indonesia at the Miss Universe 2020 pageant where she placed in the top 21, becoming the eighth and third consecutive Indonesian woman to place at the pageant.

== Early life and background ==
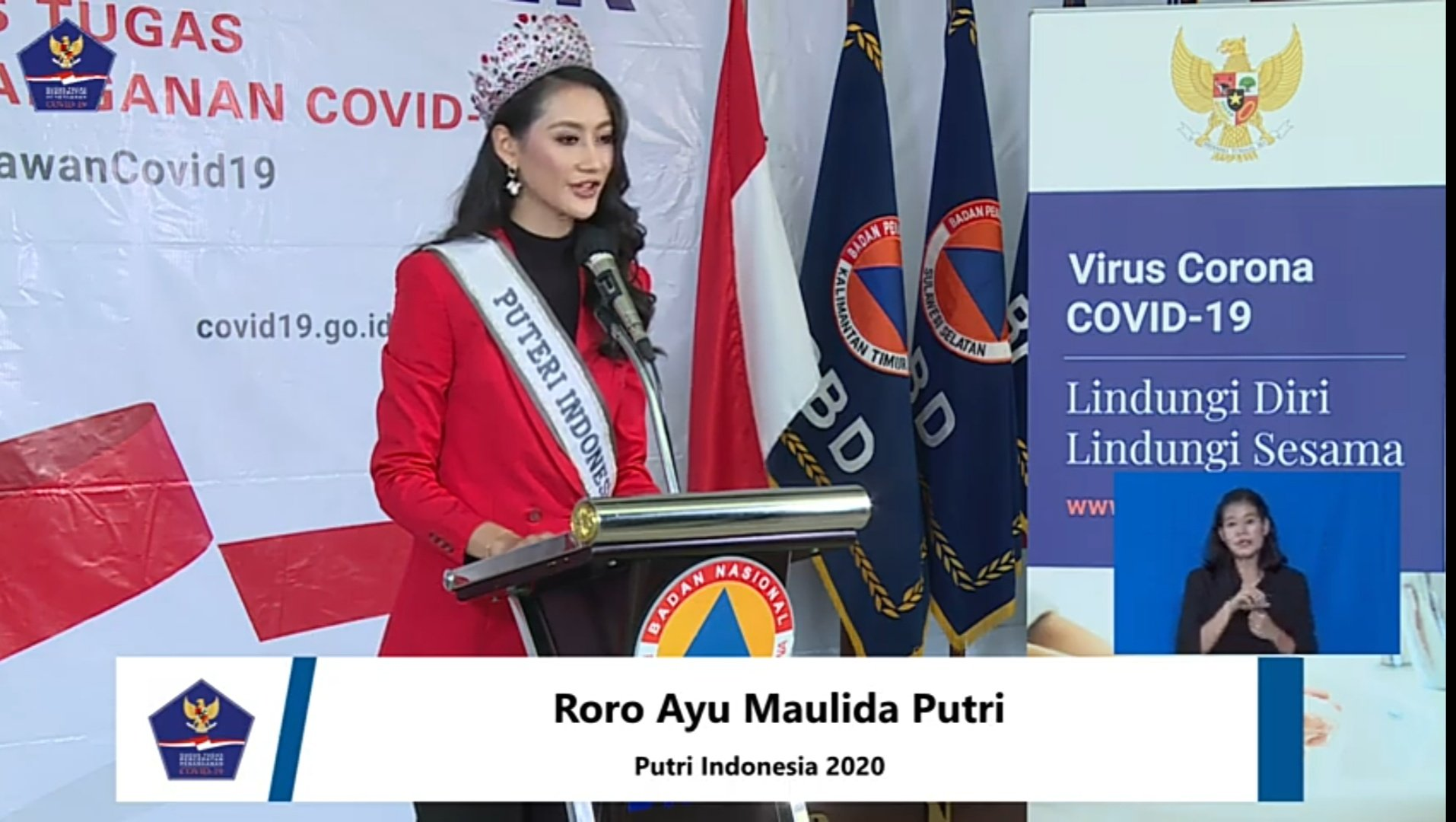
Maulida selected as the National Head of Communication of the Indonesian COVID-19 Response Acceleration Task Force in State Palace on April 3, 2020.

Born with the Javanese Royal Noble (Raden Roro ꦫꦢꦺꦤ꧀ꦫꦺꦴꦫꦺꦴ), Maulida was raised in Surabaya with a Royal family tradition, she is the second child of three siblings. She works as a model since she was 14, she graduated three and a half years with a law degree from Airlangga University, Surabaya – East Java. In 2015, Maulida chosen as one of the Indonesian delegation on an exchange Model United Nations-trip program to Seoul, South Korea, 24th Harvard Model United Nations Conference.

On March 12, 2020, together with Puteri Indonesia 2020 titleholders Putu Ayu Saraswati and Jihane Almira Chedid, Maulida elected as Indonesian People's Consultative Assembly Ambassador by the Speaker of the People's Consultative Assembly, Bambang Soesatyo. On April 3, 2020, together with Puteri Indonesia Lingkungan 2011 - Reisa Kartikasari, Maulida was selected as the National Head of Communication for the Indonesian COVID-19 Response Acceleration Task Force by the President of Indonesia - Joko Widodo in State Palace, coordinated by Indonesian National Board for Disaster Management, involves Ministry of Health, Indonesian National Police, and Indonesian Armed Forces.

Additionally, she has organized charity works in the remote villages (desa) in the entire islands of Indonesia, with her own Non-governmental organization called #SenyumDesa (Smiling Village), with Airlangga University alumni as the volunteers. Helping the society with a vision to bring the smile from one remote village to another remote village through Gotong royong spirits, by bringing the advanced infrastructure development for education, healthcare, electricity access, and internet access.

== Pageantry ==
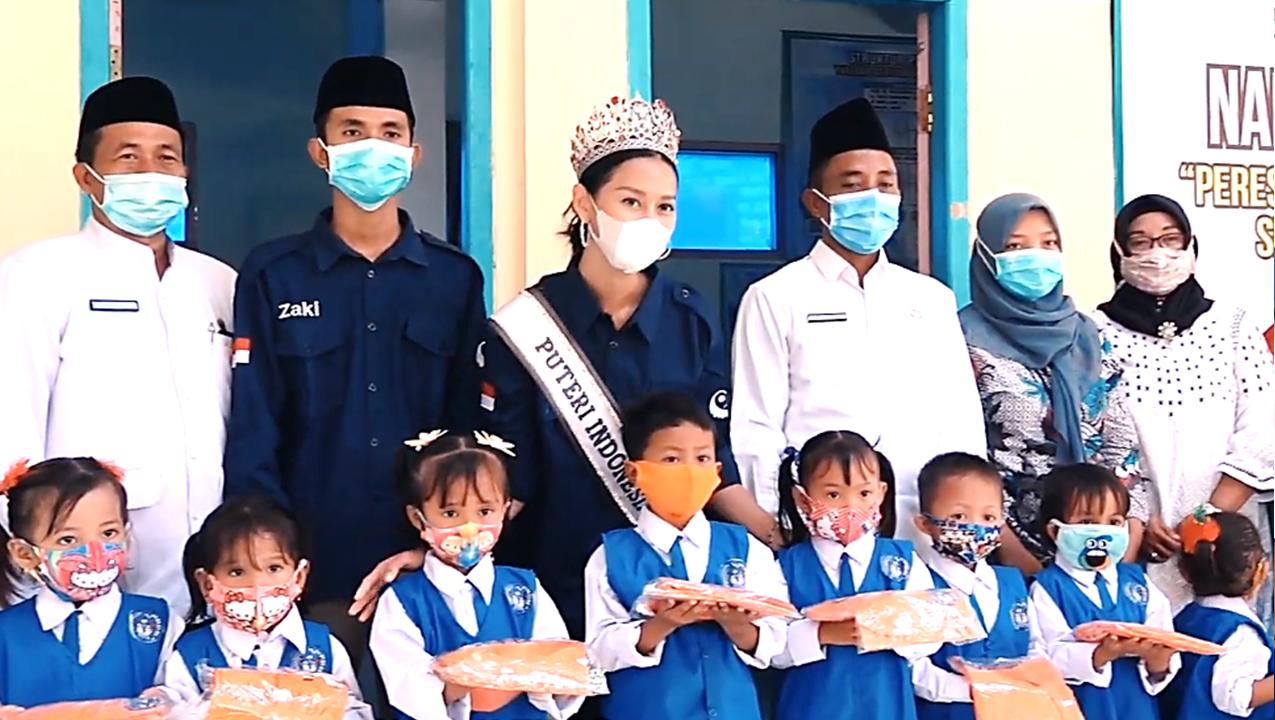
Maulida NGO, "#SenyumDesa" during Face of Asia 2019 video campaign.

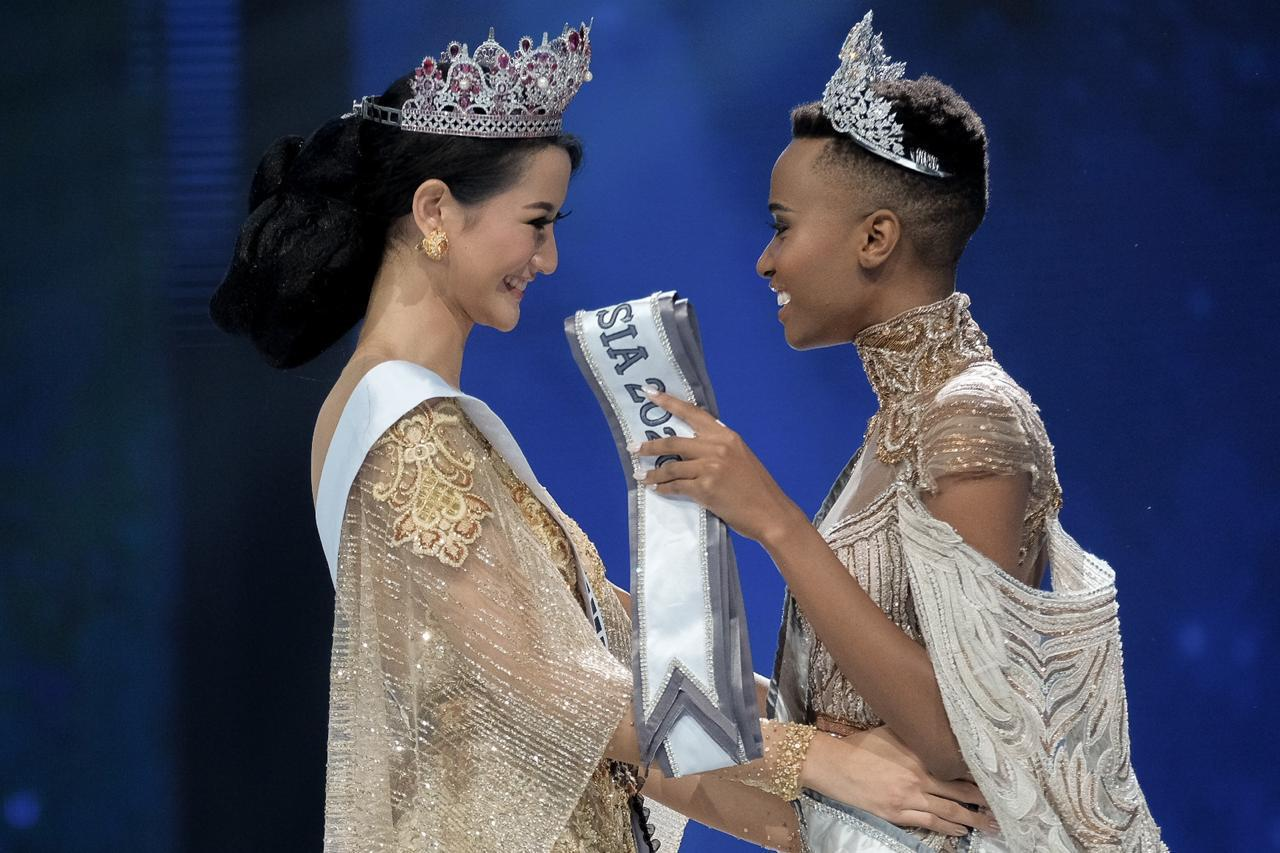
Maulida wearing Kebaya together with Miss Universe 2019, Zozibini Tunzi of South Africa at the Puteri Indonesia 2020.

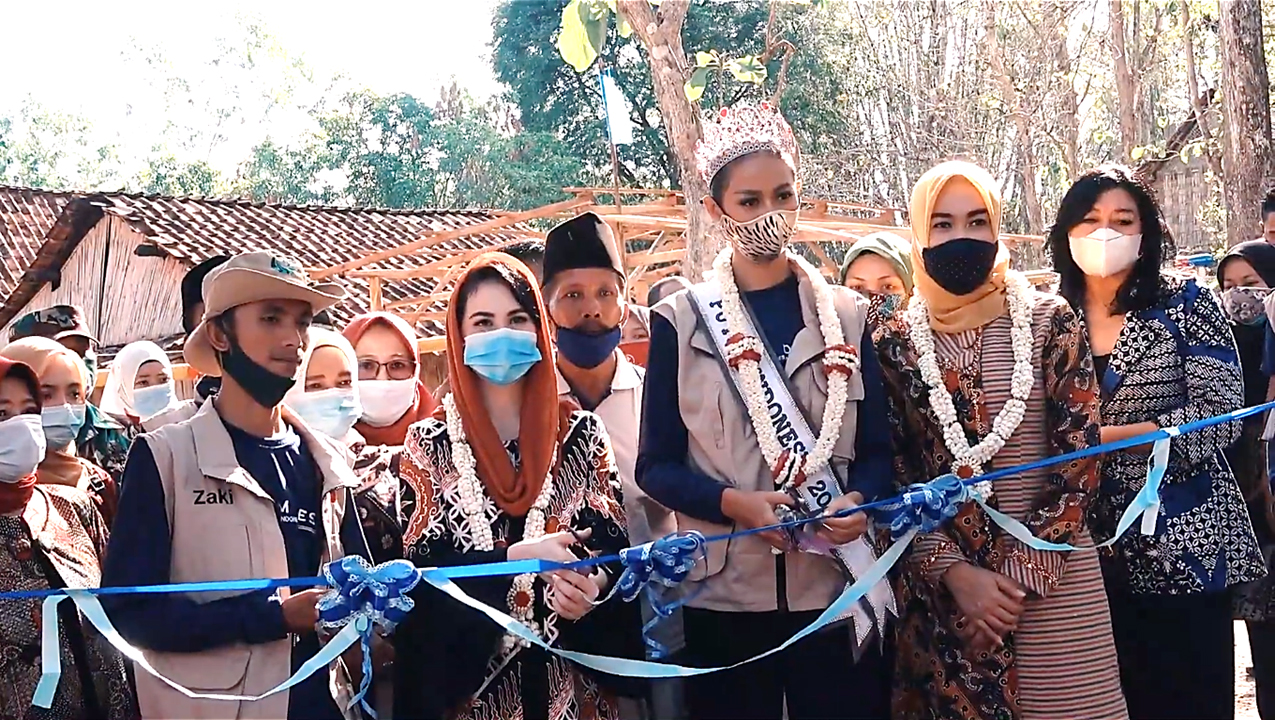
Maulida NGO, "#SenyumDesa" in Sampang Regency, Madura Island.

=== Face of Indonesia 2019 ===
Before stepping into the field of pageantry, Maulida took part in "Face of Indonesia 2019" held by Indonesia Fashion Week 2019, the largest modeling event in Indonesia, the competition held on March 31, 2019, at Jakarta Convention Center, where she won the "Best Catwalk Female Model" award, an award given for the first time since its initial implementation in 6 years. By winning the title of "Face of Indonesia 2019", she gained the right to represent Indonesia to compete in the international competition, "Face of Asia 2019". She demonstrated clothing from designers such as Poppy Dharsono, Agnes Budisurya, Danjyo Hiyoji, Barli Asmara, Misan, Tethuna, and Lia Afif. Later in 2021, Maulida received the privileges to walk as a main guest star in Jakarta Fashion Week 2021, together with the reigning Puteri Indonesia 2020 Queens Putu Ayu Saraswati and Jihane Almira Chedid.

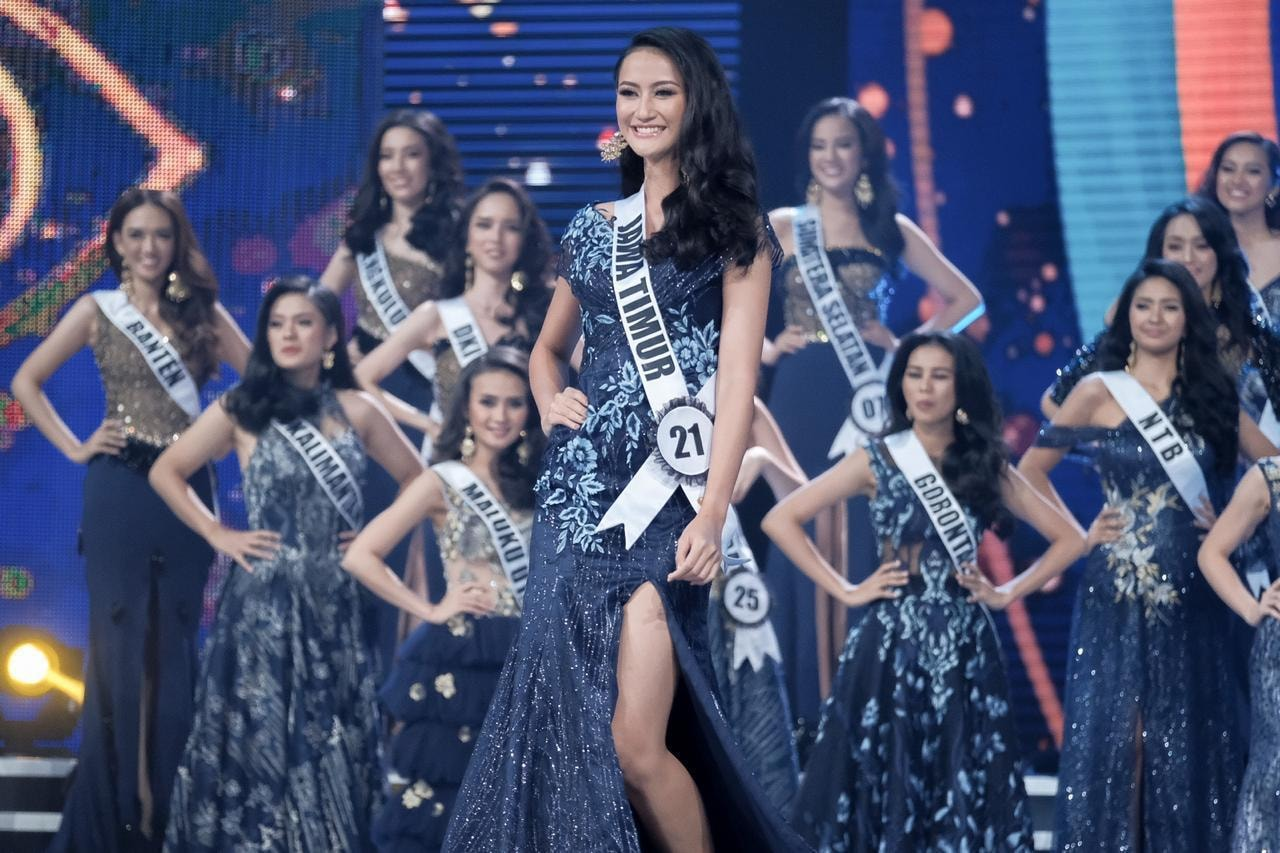
Maulida representing Jawa Timur, competed in Puteri Indonesia 2020.

=== Face of Asia 2019 ===
On June 7, 2019, Maulida along with 4 other Indonesian representatives (Zian Alfin, Chealsea McKenzie, Joel Leo Pollock, and Alfrida Alifia) took part in the Face of Asia 2019 modeling contest held in Seoul, South Korea. She won the Face of Asia, titled "Grand Prize Winner" the highest title in the contest. She managed to surpass 74 other participants from 27 countries.

=== Puteri Indonesia East Java 2017 and 2020 ===
Maulida joined the contest at the provincial level of the Puteri Indonesia East Java 2017, but she failed to win the title, and ended as first runner-up after the contest was won by Fatma Ayu Husnasari from Blitar. In 2020, she returned to the contest, and was chosen as the winner of Puteri Indonesia East Java 2020.

=== Puteri Indonesia 2020 ===
After qualifying the provincial title of Puteri Indonesia East Java 2020, Maulida represented the province of East Java in the national beauty contest, Puteri Indonesia 2020, which was held on March 6, 2020. She was selected as the winner of Miss Universe Indonesia, and also won the special award for "Best in Traditional Costume" and "2nd Runner-up in Best in Evening Gown". The final coronation night was graced by the reigning Miss Universe 2019, Zozibini Tunzi and Miss Universe 2015, Pia Wurtzbach as the selection committee. During her finale night speech, Maulida raised her charity foundation called #SenyumDesa, which helps rural villagers across the islands of Indonesia. Maulida said:

"We as a Woman have the capacity to impact the community wherever we are, My platform "Senyum Desa" founded in 2017, makes me believe that this is our duty to give awareness and spread positivity. I truly believe a strong Woman stands up for herself, But a stronger Woman empowers others, so let's make the universe smile together...
I am Ayu Maulida, from Jawa Timur..."

— "Puteri Indonesia 2020, Top 11 Speech Competition (HD) from 0:32-1:02", YouTube

=== Miss Universe 2020 ===
As the winner of Puteri Indonesia 2020, Maulida represented Indonesia at the Miss Universe 2020 pageant which was held on May 16, 2021, at Seminole Hard Rock Hotel & Casino in Hollywood, Florida, United States. At the finale, Maulida finished as one of the Top 21 semifinalists.

Maulida brought a national costume with the Komodo dragon-inspired ensemble, the last link to Prehistoric-Dinosaurs that is endemic to the Indonesian islands of Komodo, Rinca, Flores, and Gili Motang. Weighing 136 kg (300 lb), the costume also features the beading metal plates resembling scales were intricately hand-stitched, 3D chest piece and dramatic tail were created using leather laser cutting, mechatronics of the Komodo dragon headdress, a light up choker and gloves created with a lighting control system.

== See also ==
- Puteri Indonesia 2020
- Miss Universe 2020
- Putu Ayu Saraswati
- Jihane Almira Chedid

Awards and achievements
Preceded by Bella Putri Ekasandra	Puteri East Java; 2020	Succeeded by Adinda Cresheilla
Preceded by Jakarta SCR 1 – Frederika Alexis Cull	Puteri Indonesia; 2020	Succeeded by Bali; Laksmi Shari De-Neefe Suardana
