= Gossip Girl Indonesia =

- Promotional release poster
- Genre: Teen drama
- Created by: Josh Schwartz; Stephanie Savage
- Based on: Cecily von Ziegesar (books) and; Josh Schwartz Stephanie Savage (original TV series)
- Screenplay by: Lucky Kuswandi; Nia Dinata
- Directed by: Nia Dinata
- Creative director: Ade Gimbal
- Starring: Amanda Rawles; Jihane Almira Chedid; Rayssa Dynta; Jordy Rizkyanda; Baskara Mahendra; Jerome Kurnia; Arya Vasco; Tatyana Akman
- Narrated by: Ayushita Nugraha (as Gossip Girl)
- Composers: Rayssa Dynta; Aghi Narottama
- Country of origin: Indonesia
- Original language: Indonesian
- No. of seasons: 1
- No. of episodes: 9

Production
- Executive producer: Nia Dinata
- Producer: Nina Desilina
- Production locations: Jakarta, Indonesia
- Cinematography: Edi Santoso
- Editors: Ahsan Andrian; Bernades Salvano
- Production companies: GoPlay Original; Kalyana Shira Films

Original release
- Network: Gojek
- Release: February 14 – May 2, 2020

Related
- Gossip Girl (2007–2012)

Gossip Girl Indonesia is an Indonesian teen drama streaming television series developed by Nia Dinata for GoPlay. It is adapted from the American television series Gossip Girl (2007–2012), which is based on a series of books of the same name by Cecily von Ziegesar. The series stars Amanda Rawles as Serena Darsono, Jihane Almira as Blair Hadiningrat, Rayssa Dynta as Jenny Hakim, Bagus Jordy Rizkyanda as Erik Darsono, Baskara Mahendra as Danny Hakim, Jerome Kurnia as Chicco Salim, and Arya Vasco as Nathan Siregar. The story revolves around a group of privileged Jakarta teens and notorious Instagram account @GossipGirl.Indo who watches their every move and becomes the source of all the important news about these raging hormone teens’ scandal.

The series premiered on February 14, 2020.

== Cast and characters ==
=== Main ===
- Amanda Rawles as Serena Darsono, a charming it girl and fashion influencer who had just returned from a mysterious absence
- Jihane Almira Chedid as Blair Hadiningrat, the scheming queen bee who is always jealous of her best friend
- Rayssa Dynta as Jenny Hakim, a junior who is desperate to join Blair's clique
- Bagus Jordy Rizkyanda as Erik Darsono, younger brother of Serena who's secretly staying in a rehabilitation center after his suicide attempt
- Baskara Mahendra as Danny Hakim, an academically-bright student from Bintaro who hates Serena's glamorous and privileged world
- Jerome Kurnia as Chicco Salim
- Arya Vasco as Nathaniel "Nathan/Nate" Siregar, childhood boyfriend of Blair who's in love with Serena

=== Recurring ===
- Aida Nurmala as Ella Hadiningrat, a depressed designer who is extremely critical of her daughter, Blair
- Izabel Jahja as Lily Darsono, mother of Serena and Erik who shares a past with Diki
- Ariyo Wahab as Dicky Hakim, a former poet who owns a gallery. He's a father to Danny and Jenny who recently has been reunited with his love from the past, Lily
- Ralph Tampubolon as Alex Siregar, Nate's father who is committing fraud
- Shelo Mitadiah as Dewi Siregar, Nate's mother and a socialite
- Marcelino Lefrandt as Alwi Salim, Chicco's father who is having an affair with Lily
- Chanceline Ebel and Yovie Carissa as Jenna and Jedar, the comedical minions of Blair
- Elmo Hill as Armin Rajasa, father of Blair who ran away to Thailand with his lover
- Jajang C. Noer as Bi Inah, The Hadiningrat family's maid
- Tatyana Akman as Vanessa, an old friend of Danny who just returned from Australia

=== Special guest ===
- Atiqah Hasiholan as Lisa Hakim, Dicky's wife who is an artist and currently lives in Yogyakarta

== Production ==
=== Development ===
The series was announced after GoPlay's launch on September 27, 2019. It is developed by Nia Dinata, who also serves as the showrunner, director, and writer. Realizing that the issues contained in the original series are still relevant in the present day, especially amongst Gen-Z, director Nia Dinata and her team is interested to adapt the series. With the series being localized, some adjustments had been made to relate with recent situations, including the characters' last names and social issues happening to or around them. The series was filmed for a month in December 2019, before releasing the episodes weekly on February 14, 2020.

The second season of Gossip Girl Indonesia was announced on May 8, 2020. Filming officially began in September 2020. However, due to Jakarta's PSBB, the production was stopped and never resumed.

=== Casting ===
On December 19, 2019, it was announced Amanda Rawles, Jihane Almira, Rayssa Dynta, Baskara Mahendra, Jerome Kurnia, Arya Vasco, and Tatyana Akman had joined the series in leading roles as Serena Darsono, Blair Hadiningrat, Jenny Hakim, Danny Hakim, Chicco salim, Nathaniel Siregar, and Vanessa. On January 27, 2020, it was revealed Chanceline Ebel and Yovie Carissa were cast in undisclosed roles as Blair's minions, which later proved to be Jenna and Jeddar, the Indonesian iteration of Isabel Coates and Kati Farkas. Ariyo Wahab, Aida Nurmala, Marcelino Lefrandt, along with Indonesian top-tier actress Jajang C. Noer, and newcomer Izabel Jahja also joined the series in recurring roles, while Bagus Jordy Rizkyanda joined as Erik Darsono. During the 8th and 9th episode, Atiqah Hasiholan made a special appearance as Lisa Hakim, Diki's wife and mother to Danny and Jenny who is currently living in Yogyakarta.

Tissa Biani joined the series' second season as Gina.
