= Puteri Indonesia 2020 =

Beauty pageant competition

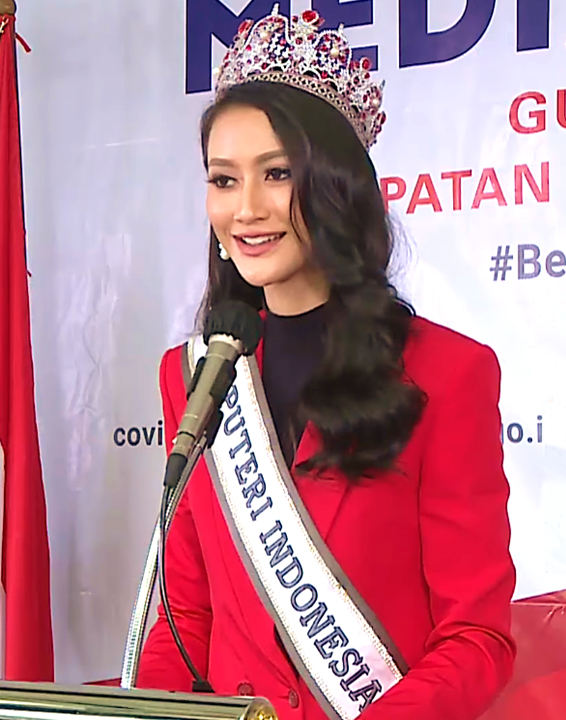
- Ayu Maulida Putri
- Date: 6 March 2020
- Presenters: Choky Sitohang; Patricia Gouw; Karina Nadila; Wilda Octaviana
- Entertainment: Bunga Citra Lestari; Isyana Sarasvati; Afgansyah Reza
- Theme: The Jewel of Indonesia – Colorful East Nusa Tenggara
- Venue: Jakarta Convention Center, Jakarta, Indonesia
- Broadcaster: SCTV
- Entrants: 39
- Placements: 11
- Winner: Raden Roro Ayu Maulida Putri; East Java

Puteri Indonesia 2020, the 24th Puteri Indonesia pageant, was held on 6 March 2020 at Jakarta Convention Center in Jakarta, Indonesia. Frederika Alexis Cull, Puteri Indonesia 2019, crowned her successor, Raden Roro Ayu Maulida Putri of East Java at the end of the event. She represented Indonesia at Miss Universe 2020, where she placed among the Top 20 finalists.

Jolene Marie Rotinsulu of North Sulawesi, Puteri Indonesia Lingkungan 2019, and Jesica Fitriana of West Java, Puteri Indonesia Pariwisata 2019, crowned their successors, Putu Ayu Saraswati of Bali and Jihane Almira Chedid of Central Java, respectively. Saraswati decided to not compete at Miss International 2022, while Chedid placed in the Top 12 Miss Supranational 2021.

The pageant featured the Jewel of Indonesia theme, as well as a series of Puteri Indonesia quarantine events held on the islands of Labuan Bajo and Komodo Island, both located in East Nusa Tenggara. Contestants from 39 provinces and territories participated.

The finale was attended by Miss Universe 2019, Zozibini Tunzi of South Africa; Miss International 2019, Sireethorn Leearamwat of Thailand; and Miss Supranational 2019, Anntonia Porsild of Thailand.

== Results ==
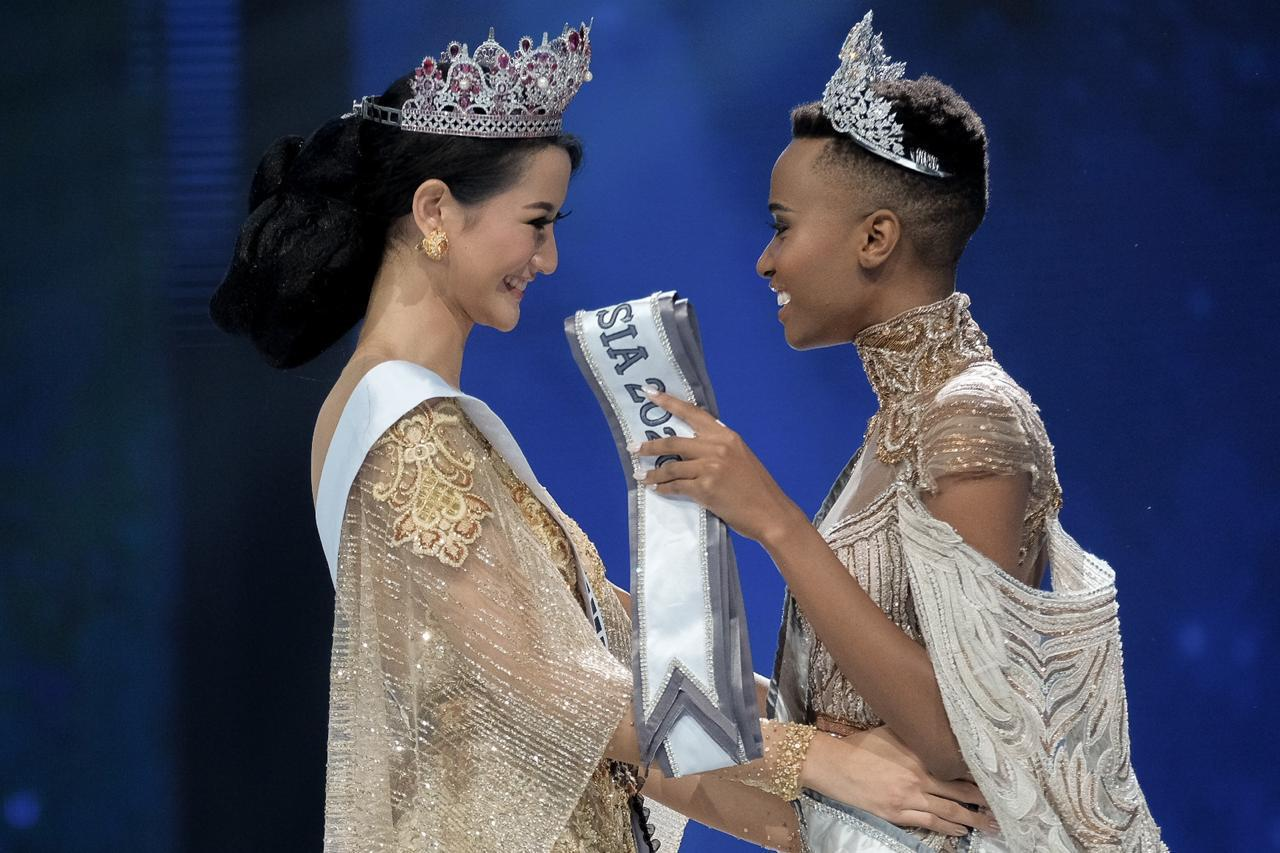
Puteri Indonesia 2020 (Miss Universe Indonesia 2020), Raden Roro Ayu Maulida Putri together with Miss Universe 2019, Zozibini Tunzi of South Africa.

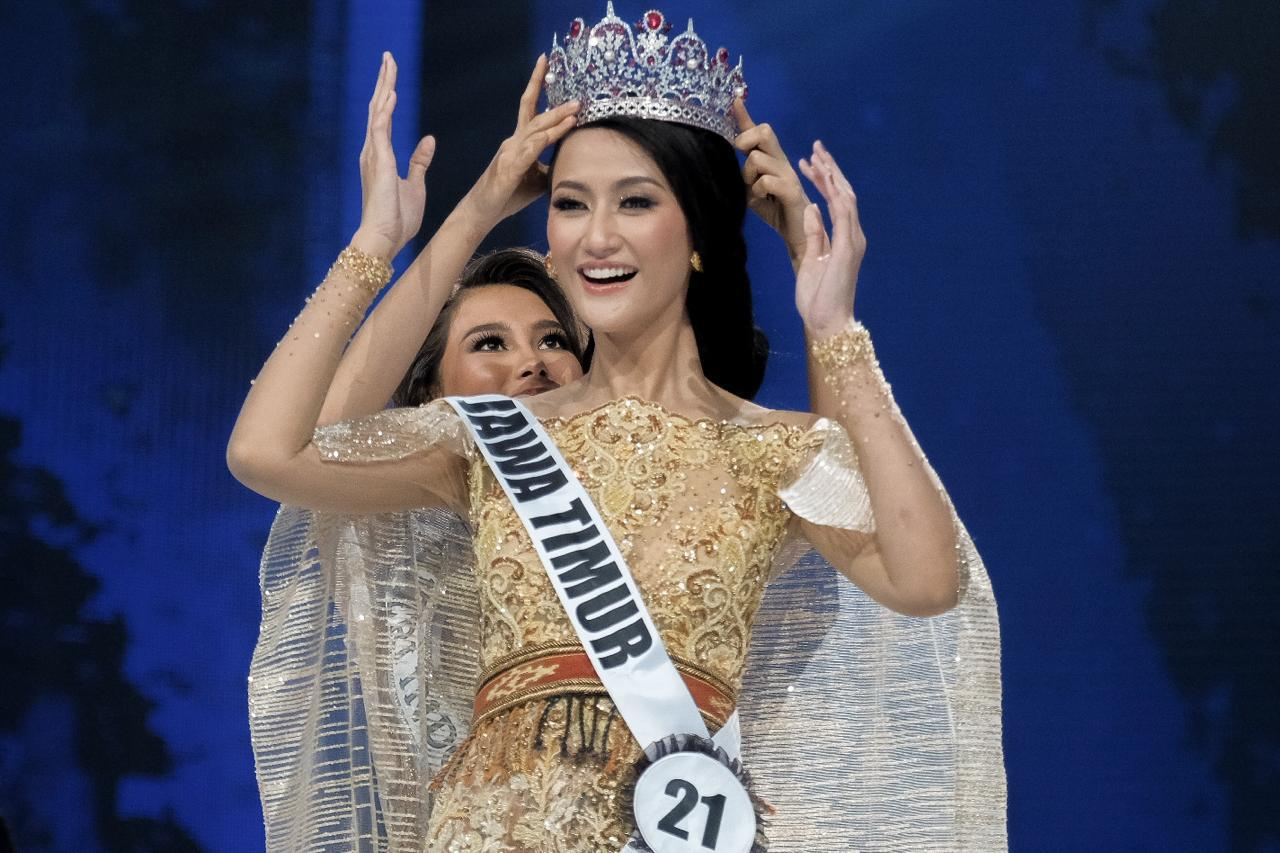
Maulida crowned Puteri Indonesia 2020 (Miss Universe Indonesia 2020) by her predecessor Frederika Alexis Cull at the Puteri Indonesia 2020 coronation night.

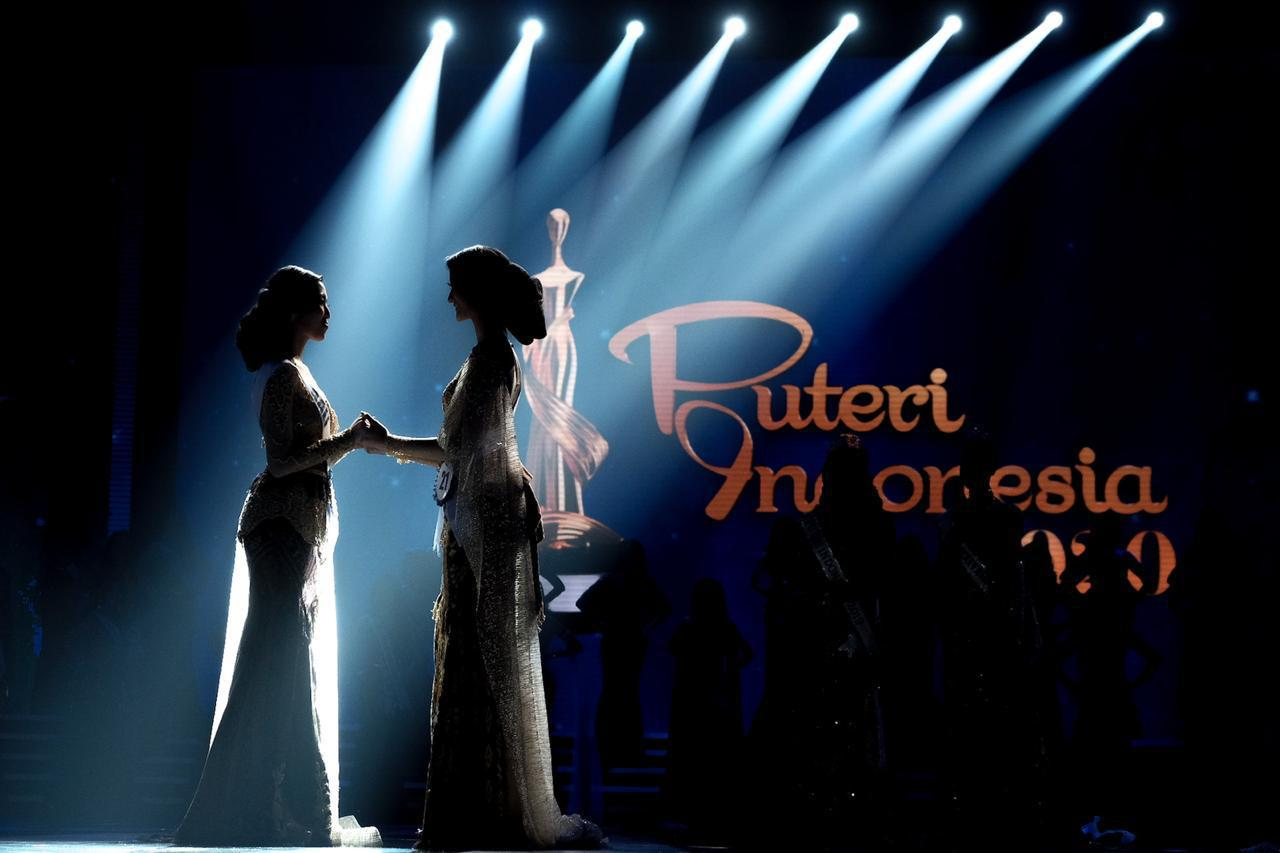
Puteri Indonesia 2020 Crowning Moment, Raden Roro Ayu Maulida Putri crowned Puteri Indonesia 2020 (Miss Universe Indonesia 2020) and Putu Ayu Saraswati crowned Puteri Indonesia Lingkungan 2020 (Miss International Indonesia 2021).

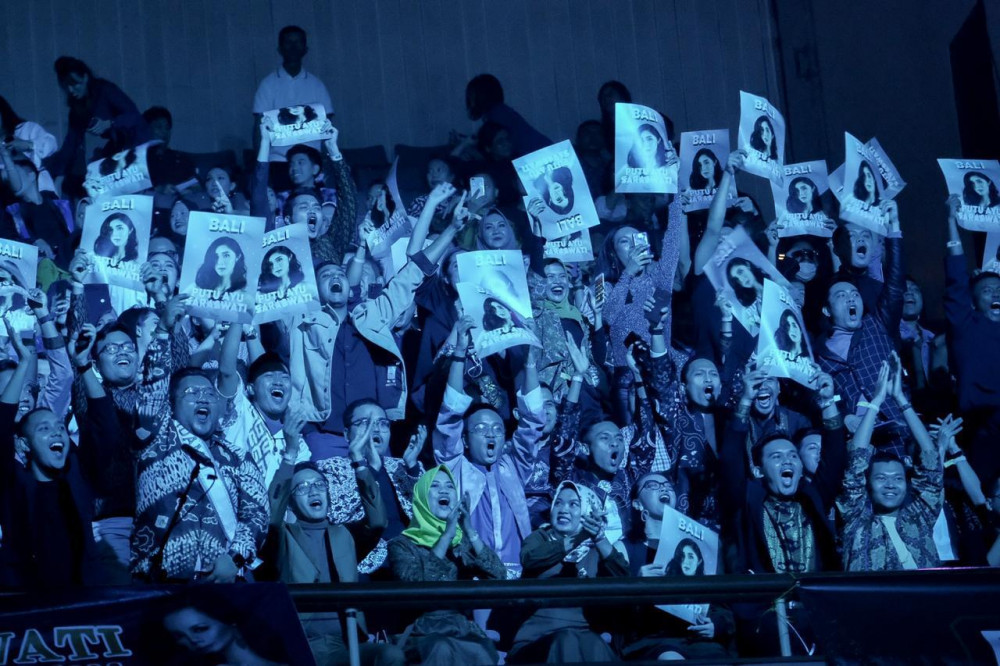
Indonesian Pageant-lover supporting the Puteri Indonesia 2020 candidates.

=== Main ===
==== The Puteri Indonesia 2020 Titleholders ====
Puteri Indonesia 2020 (Miss Universe Indonesia 2020)
Puteri Indonesia Lingkungan 2020
Puteri Indonesia Pariwisata 2020 (Miss Supranational Indonesia 2021)

Placement	Contestant	International placement
Puteri Indonesia 2020	East Java – Raden Roro Ayu Maulida Putri	Top 21 – Miss Universe 2020
Puteri Indonesia Lingkungan 2020	Bali – Putu Ayu Saraswati	Withdrew
Puteri Indonesia Pariwisata 2020	Central Java – Jihane Almira Chedid	Top 12 – Miss Supranational 2021
Top 6	3rd Runner-up West Sumatra – Louise Kalista Wilson-Iskandar; 4th Runner-up East Nusa Tenggara – Angel Virginia Boelan; 5th Runner-up Maluku – Yoan Clara Teken	
Top 11	East Kalimantan – Dianissa Scheherazade Rahman §; North Sumatra – Meghna Sharma; South Sulawesi – Karina Pricilla Widjaja; West Kalimantan – Olivia Putri Leanartha Lim; West Papua – Hivanly Salawane Leha	

§ Voted into the Top 11 by social media and fan-voting

=== Special Award ===
Title	Contestant
Puteri Indonesia Persahabatan (Miss Congeniality)	North Kalimantan — Rachel Eleeza Coloay
Puteri Indonesia Intelegensia (Miss Intelligence)	(gold) North Sulawesi — Desiree Magdalena Roring; (silver) West Java — Jeanatasia Kurnia Sari Soebagio; (bronze) Central Sulawesi — Fernanda Ciandra
Puteri Indonesia Berbakat (Miss Talent)	(gold) West Java — Jeanatasia Kurnia Sari Soebagio; (silver) Central Java — Jihane Almira Chedid; (bronze) Bengkulu — Belinda Pritasari Basaruddin Jacobsen
Best National Costume	(gold) East Java — Raden Roro Ayu Maulida Putri; (silver) East Nusa Tenggara — Angel Virginia Boelan; (bronze) Jambi — Veronika Tri Mardani
Best Evening Gown	(gold) Central Java — Jihane Almira Chedid; (silver) West Sumatra — Louise Kalista Wilson-Iskandar; (bronze) East Java — Raden Roro Ayu Maulida Putri

=== Puteri Indonesia Kepulauan ===
Puteri Indonesia Kepulauan is a title for the most favorite contestant chosen through votes from each island group:

Title	Contestant
Puteri Indonesia Sumatra (Princess of Sumatra)	Riau Islands — Adesti Apriani
Puteri Indonesia Jawa (Princess of Java)	Jakarta SCR 5 — Hillary Masrin
Puteri Indonesia Nusa-Bali (Princess of Lesser Sunda Islands)	Bali — Putu Ayu Saraswati
Puteri Indonesia Kalimantan (Princess of Kalimantan)	Central Kalimantan — Amelia Nurmawati Edmil
Puteri Indonesia Sulawesi (Princess of Sulawesi)	North Sulawesi — Desiree Magdalena Roring
Puteri Indonesia Timur (Princess of Eastern Indonesia)	North Maluku — Kathy Monica Kabe

== Selection Committee ==
There were ten selection committee members:

- Kusuma Dewi Sutanto – Jury President, Puteri Indonesia Foundation Head of Education
- Mega Angkasa – Jury Secretary, Mustika Ratu Head of Communication and Public Relation of Puteri Indonesia
- Kusuma Ida Anjani – Puteri Indonesia Head of Organizing Committee
- Sonia Fergina Citra – Puteri Indonesia 2018 and Miss Universe 2018 Top 20 from Bangka Belitung
- Pia Wurtzbach – Miss Universe 2015 from Philippines
- Wishnutama – Minister of Tourism and Creative Economy of the Republic of Indonesia
- Erick Thohir – Minister of State Owned Enterprises of the Republic of Indonesia
- Bambang Soesatyo – Chairperson of the People's Representative Council of the Republic of Indonesia
- I Gusti Ayu Bintang Darmawati – Minister of Women Empowerment and Child Protection of the Republic of Indonesia
- Triawan Munaf – chairman of the board of Commissioner in Garuda Indonesia

== Contestants ==
39 delegates participated in the competition.

Province	Contestants	Age	Height	Hometown	Notes
Sumatra
Aceh	Afra Widi Wardani	22	1.73 m (5 ft 8 in)	Lhokseumawe	(Note: Afra Widi Wardani was Putri Pariwisata Nusantara Aceh 2019 (Winner).)
North Sumatra	Meghna Sharma	24	1.75 m (5 ft 9 in)	Medan	
West Sumatra	Louise Kalista Wilson-Iskandar	21	1.78 m (5 ft 10 in)	Bukittinggi	(Note: Louise Kalista Wilson-Iskandar was Putri Batik Nusantara 2019 (Top 5 & Miss Congeniality).)
Riau	Devi Maharani Kosa	23	1.72 m (5 ft 8 in)	Siak	
Riau Islands	Adesti Apriani	18	1.71 m (5 ft 7 in)	Batam	
Jambi	Veronika Tri Mardani	19	1.70 m (5 ft 7 in)	Bungo	
South Sumatra	Widya Ayu Pratami	23	1.75 m (5 ft 9 in)	Palembang	(Note: Widya Ayu Pratami was Miss Tourism South Sumatra Indonesia 2015 (Winner).)
Bangka Belitung	Monica Sarah Wongkar	24	1.75 m (5 ft 9 in)	Pangkal Pinang	
Bengkulu	Belinda Pritasari Basaruddin Jacobsen	25	1.75 m (5 ft 9 in)	Bengkulu	(Note: Belinda Pritasari Jacobsen was Miss Earth Indonesia 2015 (Winner).)
Lampung	Irene Theodora	19	1.70 m (5 ft 7 in)	Pesawaran	(Note: Irene Theodora was Muli Lampung 2019 (Winner).)
Jakarta SCR
Jakarta SCR 1	Stephanie Cecillia Munthe	25	1.70 m (5 ft 7 in)	Jakarta	(Note: Stephanie Cecillia Munthe was Miss Grand Indonesia 2018 (2nd Runner-up).)
Jakarta SCR 2	Ayu Afni Dwisamudra	24	1.70 m (5 ft 7 in)	Jakarta	
Jakarta SCR 3	Dinda Amalianingsih	24	1.70 m (5 ft 7 in)	Jakarta	
Jakarta SCR 4	Ermaly Arminah Erwinputri	23	1.72 m (5 ft 8 in)	Jakarta	
Jakarta SCR 5	Hillary Masrin	23	1.72 m (5 ft 8 in)	Jakarta	
Jakarta SCR 6	Gabriella Devita Febiola	22	1.72 m (5 ft 8 in)	Jakarta	
Java
Banten	Ratu Lucky Nitibaskara	25	1.72 m (5 ft 8 in)	Tangerang	
West Java	Jeanatasia Kurnia Sari Soebagio	25	1.75 m (5 ft 9 in)	Bandung	
Central Java	Jihane Almira Chedid	20	1.75 m (5 ft 9 in)	Semarang	
Special Region of Yogyakarta	Ervina Nathasia	24	1.76 m (5 ft 9 in)	Sleman	
East Java	Raden Roro Ayu Maulida Putri	22	1.79 m (5 ft 10 1/2 in)	Surabaya	(Note: Raden Roro Ayu Maulida Putri was Face of Asia 2019 (Winner).)
Lesser Sunda Islands
Bali	Putu Ayu Saraswati	22	1.75 m (5 ft 9 in)	Denpasar	
West Nusa Tenggara	Shalsabila Lestari Putri Suteja	18	1.76 m (5 ft 9 in)	Selong	
East Nusa Tenggara	Angel Virginia Boelan	20	1.75 m (5 ft 9 in)	Kupang	(Note: Angel Virginia Boelan was Face of Jakarta Fashion Week 2016 (Top 20).)
Kalimantan
West Kalimantan	Catherine Laboure Olivia Putri Leanartha Lim	22	1.73 m (5 ft 8 in)	Ketapang	(Note: Olivia Putri Leanartha was Miss Indonesia 2016 (Top 15).)
Central Kalimantan	Amelia Nurmawati Edmil	22	1.70 m (5 ft 7 in)	Palangka Raya	
South Kalimantan	Ayu Putri Saraswati	23	1.72 m (5 ft 8 in)	Banjarbaru	
East Kalimantan	Dianissa Scheherazade Rachman	21	1.70 m (5 ft 7 in)	Balikpapan	
North Kalimantan	Rachel Eleeza Coloay	21	1.78 m (5 ft 10 in)	Malinau	
Sulawesi
South Sulawesi	Karina Pricilla Widjaja	25	1.76 m (5 ft 9 in)	Makassar	
West Sulawesi	Euodia Oktavia	21	1.75 m (5 ft 9 in)	Majene	
Southeast Sulawesi	Rieski Dwi Oktaviana	25	1.74 m (5 ft 9 in)	Kendari	
Central Sulawesi	Fernanda Ciandra Mabora	23	1.72 m (5 ft 8 in)	Luwuk	
North Sulawesi	Desiree Magdalena Roring	22	1.72 m (5 ft 8 in)	Manado	
Gorontalo	Rofiah Noor Amalia Katili	20	1.70 m (5 ft 7 in)	Gorontalo	
Eastern Indonesia
Maluku	Yoan Clara Teken	25	1.76 m (5 ft 9 in)	Banda Neira	
North Maluku	Kathy Monica Kabe	25	1.70 m (5 ft 7 in)	Ternate	(Note: Kathy Monica Kabe was Miss Indonesia 2018 (Unplaced).)
West Papua	Hivanly Salawane Leha	22	1.71 m (5 ft 7 in)	Sorong	
Papua	Hermin Rachel Makanuay	25	1.70 m (5 ft 7 in)	Jayapura	(Note: Hermin Rachel Makanuay was Miss Grand Indonesia 2018 (Unplaced).)

== Crossovers Notes ==
Contestants who previously competed in other local and/or international beauty pageants and reality modeling competitions:
