= Demi-Leigh Tebow =

South African model and beauty queen

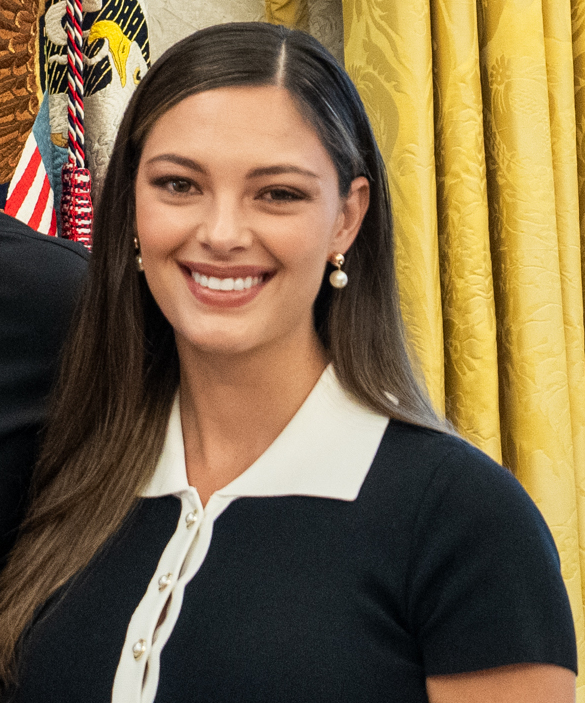
- Tebow in 2025
- Born: Demi-Leigh Nel-Peters; 28 June 1995 (age 31); Sedgefield, South Africa
- Education: North-West University
- Occupations: Model; beauty pageant titleholder
- Height: 1.71 m (5 ft 7 in)
- Spouse: Tim Tebow (m. 2020)
- Children: 1
- Beauty pageant titleholder
- Title: Miss South Africa 2017; Miss Universe 2017
- Hair colour: Brown
- Eye colour: Brown
- Major competitions: Miss South Africa 2017 (Winner); Miss Universe 2017 (Winner)
- Website: demileigh.com

Demi-Leigh Tebow (/ˈdɛmɪ liː ˈtiːboʊ/ DE-mee-LEE TEE-boh; née Nel-Peters; born 28 June 1995) is a South African model, author, anti-trafficking advocate, and beauty pageant titleholder best known for winning the title of Miss Universe 2017. She was crowned Miss South Africa 2017, and the second of the three Miss Universe winners from South Africa, following Margaret Gardiner, who won and was crowned Miss Universe 1978 and before Zozibini Tunzi won in 2019.

== Early life and education ==
Demi-Leigh Nel-Peters was born on 28 June 1995 in Sedgefield, Western Cape, to Bennie Peters and Anne-Marie Steenkamp. She identified her half-sister, Franje, who was born with cerebellar agenesis, as the most significant motivator in her life. Franje died on 4 May 2019, aged 13.

Nel-Peters graduated from North-West University in March 2017, a few days before winning the Miss South Africa 2017 competition. She is fluent in both English and Afrikaans.

Nel-Peters also won Miss Varsity Cup 2015 and was a Top 5 finalist in Miss Teen SA in 2010.

== Pageantry ==
=== Miss South Africa 2017 ===
Nel-Peters represented Western Cape in the Miss South Africa 2017 competition on 26 March 2017, which she won. As Miss South Africa, she had the right to represent South Africa in both Miss World 2017 and Miss Universe 2017, but since the dates of the two pageants coincided, she was sent only to Miss Universe, held in Las Vegas, Nevada.

=== Miss Universe 2017 ===
In the final round Steve Harvey asked Nel-Peters, "What quality in yourself are you most proud of and how will you apply that quality to your time as Miss Universe?" She said:

As a Miss Universe, you have to be confident in who you are as an individual. And Miss Universe is a woman that has overcome many fears, and by that she is able to help other women to overcome their fears. She is a woman that nothing is ever too much to ask for and I think that is exactly who I am.

When asked about what she thought was the most important issue regarding women in the workplace, she said:

In some places, women get paid 75% of what men earn for doing the same job, working the same hours — and I do not believe that this is right. I think we should have equal work for equal pay for women all over the world.

She went on to win the competition and was crowned Miss Universe 2017 by outgoing titleholder Iris Mittenaere. Nel-Peters is the second titleholder from South Africa; Margaret Gardiner won Miss Universe 1978.

Nel-Peters said during a segment at Miss Universe that she wants to use her self-defence workshops to help as many women as she can. This stems from an incident a month after she was crowned Miss South Africa, when she was carjacked at Hyde Park. She handed over her car keys but was forced into her car by the carjackers. She punched one of them in the throat and managed to run away and get help.

In her capacity as Miss Universe, Nel-Peters visited the Philippines (twice), Indonesia (twice), Thailand (twice), France, Mexico (twice), Ecuador, India, Lebanon, Egypt, Malaysia, various cities in the United States, and her home country, South Africa.

Nel-Peters ended her reign on 17 December 2018 in Bangkok, Thailand, the host nation of the 67th Miss Universe pageant. She eventually crowned Catriona Gray of the Philippines as her successor.

== Personal life ==
Nel-Peters is a Christian. During her reign as Miss Universe 2017, Nel-Peters began dating Tim Tebow, a former professional American football quarterback and former professional baseball outfielder for the New York Mets minor league affiliates. Nel-Peters and Tebow became engaged on 9 January 2019 at Tebow's family farm in Jacksonville, Florida. They married on 20 January 2020 in Franschhoek, Western Cape, about an hour outside of Cape Town.

== Bibliography ==
- Tebow, Demi-Leigh (13 August 2024). A Crown that Lasts: You Are Not Your Label. Nashville, Tennessee: Thomas Nelson. ISBN 978-1400343584.
- Tebow, Demi-Leigh (1 April 2025). Princess Paris Finds Her Purpose. Nashville, Tennessee: Thomas Nelson. ISBN 978-1400249503.
- Tebow, Demi-Leigh (16 September 2025). Knowing Who You Are Because of Who God Is: 100 Days to Unbreakable Faith. Nashville, Tennessee: Thomas Nelson. ISBN 978-1400250745.

== Film appearance ==
She appeared as a model in the item number "Calendar Song" in the 2024 film Indian 2.

Awards and achievements
Preceded by (France) Iris Mittenaere	Miss Universe; 2017	Succeeded by (Philippines) Catriona Gray
Preceded by (Philippines) Catriona Gray	Timeless Beauty by Missosology; 2017	Succeeded by (Vietnam) H'Hen Niê
Preceded by (Mpumalanga) Ntandoyenkosi Kunene	Miss South Africa; 2017	Succeeded by (Western Cape) Adè van Heerden
Preceded by (Western Cape) Ntandoyenkosi Kunene	Miss Universe; South Africa; 2017	Succeeded by (Mpumalanga) Tamaryn Green
