= Zozibini Tunzi =

South African beauty queen, Miss Universe 2019 winner

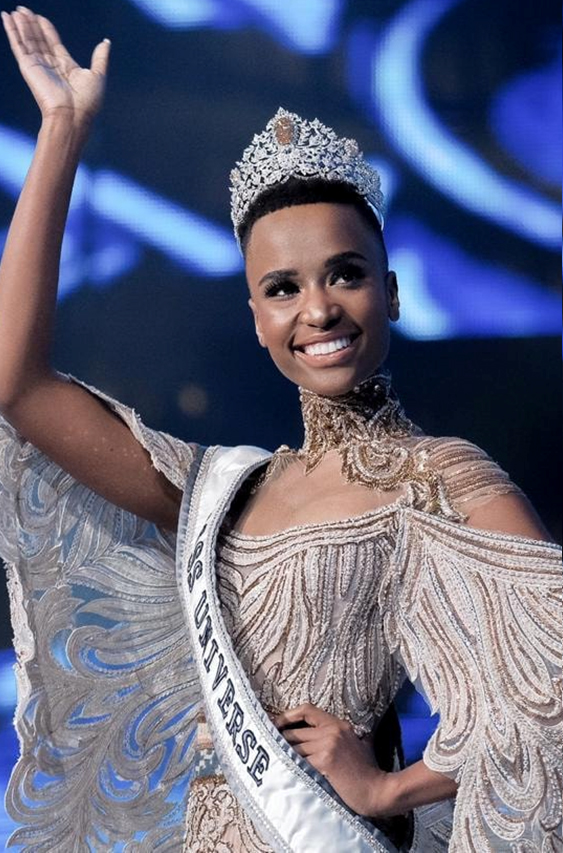
- Tunzi in 2020
- Born: 18 September 1993 (age 33); Tsolo, Eastern Cape, South Africa
- Education: Cape Peninsula University of Technology
- Spouse: Luthando Bolowana (m. 2025)
- Beauty pageant titleholder
- Title: Miss South Africa 2019; Miss Universe 2019
- Hair color: Black
- Eye color: Brown
- Major competitions: Miss South Africa 2017 (top 26); Miss South Africa 2019 (winner); Miss Universe 2019 (winner)

Zozibini "Zozi" Bolowana (née Tunzi; born 18 September 1993) is a South African model, actress, and beauty pageant titleholder who was crowned Miss Universe 2019. Tunzi had previously been crowned Miss South Africa 2019. She is the third woman from South Africa and the first black South African woman to win the title.

== Early life ==
Tunzi was born in Tsolo, Eastern Cape to parents Philiswa Nodapu and Lungisa Tunzi, and raised in the nearby village of Sidwadweni. Her mother is a school principal and her father worked for the department of higher education. Tunzi is one of four sisters. Her sisters are named Yanga, Sibabalwe, and Ayakha. Her name Zozibini means received with both hands and is of Xhosa origin.

She later moved to Cape Town, settling in the Gardens suburb, in order to attend Cape Peninsula University of Technology. She graduated with a National Diploma in public relations management in 2018. In 2017, Tunzi worked as a model and lived in East London, Eastern Cape.

Prior to winning Miss South Africa, Tunzi was completing a Bachelor of Technology graduate degree in public relations management at Cape Peninsula University of Technology, and worked as a graduate intern in the public relations department of Ogilvy Cape Town.

== Career ==
Tunzi made her acting debut in the film The Woman King, directed by Gina Prince-Bythewood, and released on 16 September 2022. In 2024, she partnered with South African retailor Foschini for their SS24 Spring/Summer collection. Her collection titled ‘A Season of Living’ showcased fashion items such as dresses, sunglasses and all things summer.

== Pageantry ==
=== Miss South Africa 2019 ===
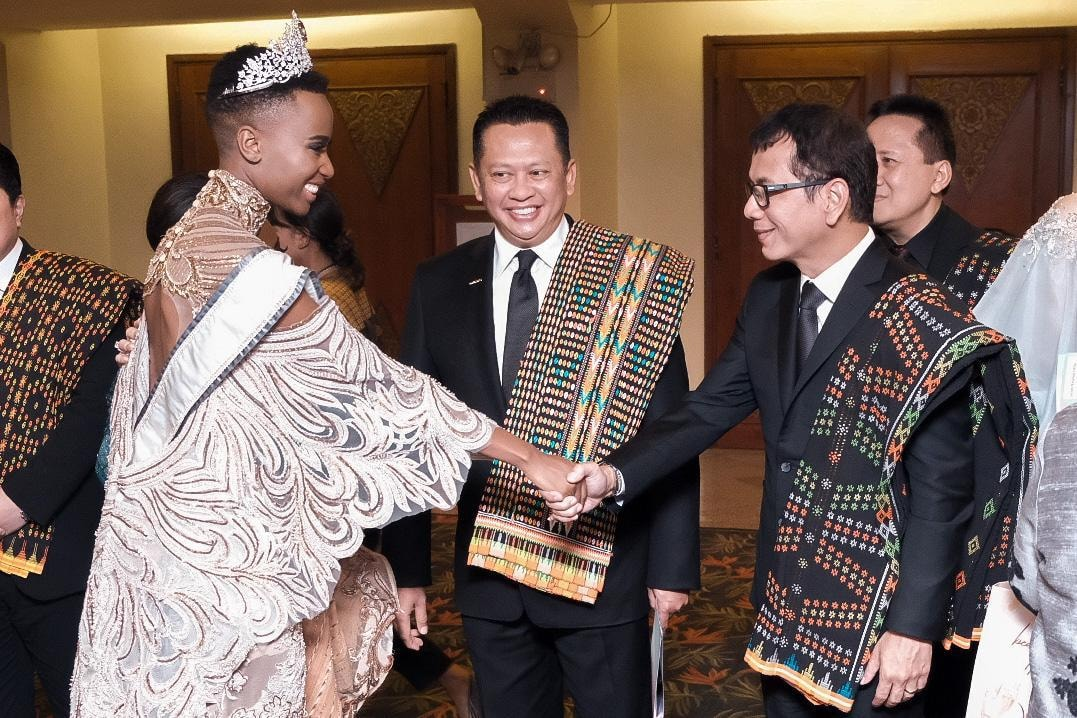
Tunzi meeting with Bambang Soesatyo and Wishnutama Kusubandio in Jakarta.

Tunzi began her pageantry career in 2017, when she was accepted as one of the top 26 semifinalists of Miss South Africa 2017. She returned to pageantry to compete in Miss South Africa 2019. On 26 June 2019, Tunzi was confirmed as one of the top 35 semifinalists of the competition, among initial applications. After further auditions, Tunzi was announced as one of the sixteen finalists on 11 July.

After being selected as one of the finalists, Tunzi went on to compete in the Miss South Africa 2019 pageant in Pretoria on 9 August. She progressed through the stages of the final, advancing to the top ten, then top five, and finally the top two until she was crowned the winner by predecessor Tamaryn Green, beating runner-up Sasha-Lee Olivier.

Following her win, Tunzi received prizes including R1 million, a new car, and a fully furnished apartment in the Sandton neighbourhood of Johannesburg, which is valued at R5 million, for her to use throughout her reign. The achievement allowed Tunzi to represent South Africa at the Miss Universe 2019 competition.

=== Miss Universe 2019 ===
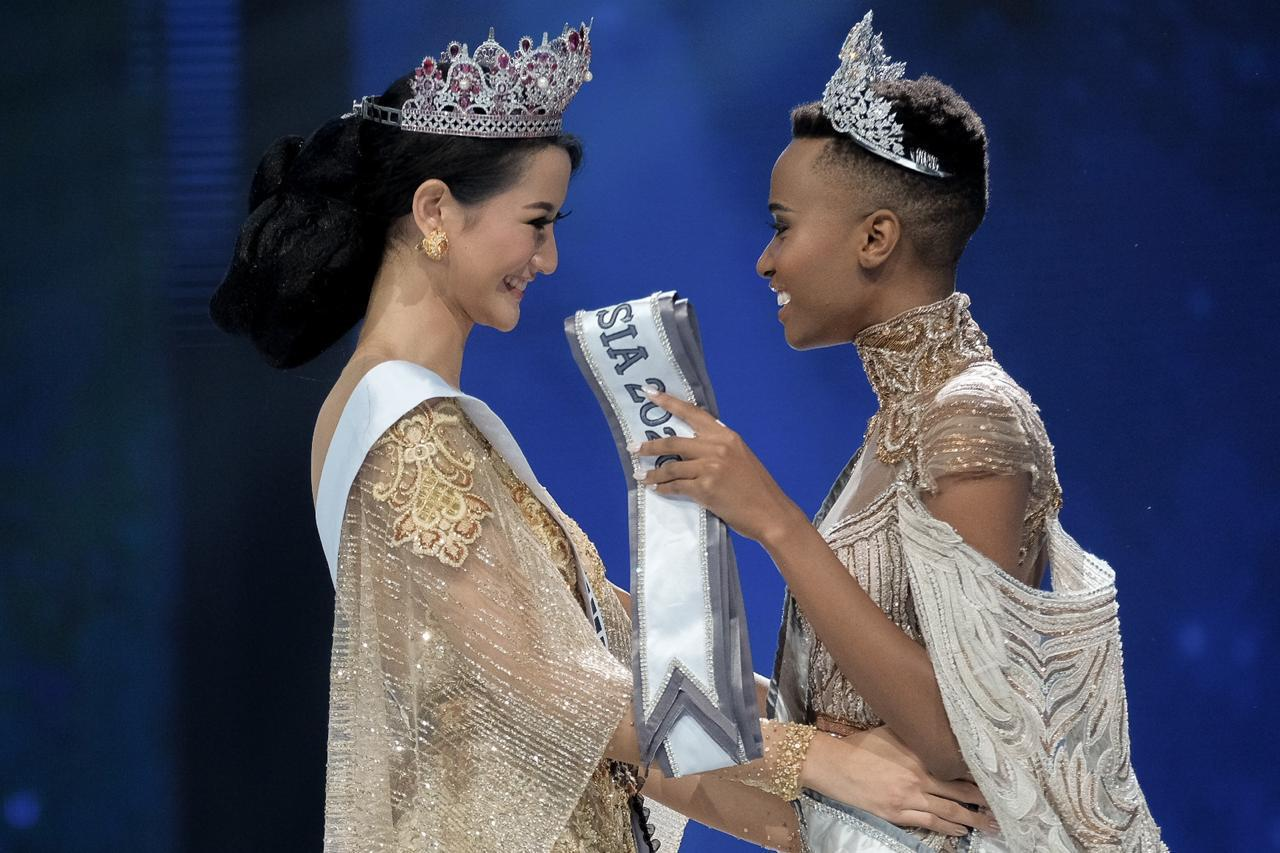
Tunzi crowning Ayu Maulida as Puteri Indonesia 2020.

Tunzi arrived in Atlanta, Georgia for Miss Universe 2019 in November 2019. She competed in the preliminaries on 6 December, and competed in the finals on 8 December at Tyler Perry Studios. During the competition, Tunzi advanced to the top twenty as the first semifinalist for the Africa/Asia-Pacific continental region. She then advanced to the top ten, then the top five, and ultimately the final three. By the end of the event, Tunzi was crowned Miss Universe 2019 by outgoing titleholder Catriona Gray of the Philippines, beating first runner-up Madison Anderson of Puerto Rico and second runner-up Sofía Aragón of Mexico.

Tunzi's win is South Africa's third Miss Universe title; she is the first black woman to win the Miss Universe title since Leila Lopes was crowned Miss Universe 2011, and the first to do so with afro-textured hair. With her win, 2019 became the first year that all four major United States–based pageants were won by black women; other titleholders were Nia Franklin (Miss America 2019), Kaliegh Garris (Miss Teen USA 2019), and Cheslie Kryst (Miss USA 2019). Additionally, 2019 would also become the first year that black women won the two most prestigious international pageants after Toni-Ann Singh of Jamaica later won Miss World 2019.

As Miss Universe, Tunzi lived in New York City, and took part in a number of events and appearances throughout the world. After winning Miss Universe, Tunzi was succeeded as Miss South Africa by her first runner-up Sasha-Lee Olivier.

In her capacity as Miss Universe, Tunzi traveled to Sumba and Jakarta in Indonesia, various cities within the United States and her home country of South Africa.

Due to the COVID-19 pandemic, Tunzi became the longest reigning Miss Universe titleholder, holding the title for a total of 525 days (1 year, 5 months and 8 days), surpassing Leila Lopes's reign of 464 days. Tunzi's reign came to an end on 16 May 2021 when she crowned Andrea Meza of Mexico as her successor at the Seminole Hard Rock Hotel & Casino, Hollywood, Florida, United States.

== Personal life ==
Tunzi married Luthando Bolowana on 22 March 2025 in Paarl, Western Cape. Their traditional wedding was held on 29 March 2025 in Sidwadweni, Eastern Cape.

== Filmography ==
Year	Title	Role	Notes
2022	The Woman King	Efe	Supporting role
2025	Bad Influencer	Naomi	Starring role

== Achievements ==
=== National Film and Television Awards ===
Year	Nominee / work	Award	Result	Ref.
2024	Herself	Celebrity Personality of the Year 2024	Nominated	

Awards and achievements
Preceded by (Philippines) Catriona Gray	Miss Universe; 2019	Succeeded by (Mexico) Andrea Meza
Preceded by Tamaryn Green	Miss South Africa; 2019	Succeeded by Sasha-Lee Olivier
Preceded by Tamaryn Green	Miss Universe South Africa; 2019	Succeeded by Natasha Joubert
