= VOY =

VOY or Voy may refer to:

- Star Trek: Voyager, a science fiction television series in the Star Trek franchise
- Voices of Youth, an organization set up by UNICEF to help children from across the world exchange knowledge and ideas
- Voy, a settlement in the Orkney Islands of the north of Scotland
- Voy's Beach, a settlement located northwest of Corner Brook
- Wikivoyage, with interwiki code "voy"
- voy, a British weight loss service

== See also ==
- Mazet-Saint-Voy, Haute-Loire, France; a commune which contains the parish of Saint-Voy de Bonas (Saint-Voy)
