= Febriana Firdaus =

Indonesian investigative journalist

- Born: Jember Regency, East Java, Indonesia
- Education: Airlangga University
- Occupations: Investigative journalist; documentary filmmaker
- Website: www.febrianafirdaus.com

Febriana Firdaus is an Indonesian investigative journalist and documentary filmmaker known for highlighting discrimination against LGBT people, West Papuan independence, and the 1965–1966 anti-communist mass killings; all of which are often considered taboo topics in Indonesia.

== Career ==
Firdaus earned a bachelor's degree in sociology from Airlangga University in the East Java capital of Surabaya in 2006. Upon graduation, she took on jobs as a reporter for several Indonesian-language publications such as Jawa Pos and Tempo up to 2014. Firdaus then became widely known by the Indonesian public for her investigative reports which have been published by several international organizations, including Time, Rappler, The Economist, Al Jazeera, Foreign Policy, and The Guardian.

Her English-language reports often garner significant attention due to the perceived sensitivity of the issues she tends to highlight among the public, particularly those with conservative political leaning. This includes the West Papuan independence movement and humanitarian issues, discrimination against the LGBT people, environmental degradation and its effects on indigenous groups, as well as the 1965–1966 anti-communist massacre carried out by the Indonesian military under then-president Suharto. Firdaus is also an editor for the podcast Ingat 65, which gives a platform to survivors and families of the massacre's victims.

In 2020, Firdaus wrote, produced, and narrated the documentary film Our Mother's Land (Tanah Ibu Kami). Directed by Leo Plunkett, the film is produced by Mongabay and the Gecko Project. The film highlights the stories of women from disenfranchised and indigenous groups who have led movements against big corporations and government development projects that harm the environment. The documentary premiered at the Ubud Writers & Readers Festival in Ubud, Bali, in October 2020 before being made available for streaming on YouTube the following month.

In January 2021, Our Mother's Land was screened at the 19th Wild & Scenic Film Festival which was held online due to the COVID-19 pandemic, where it received the Spirit of Activism Award.

== Intimidation ==
Firdaus has been subjected to a number of incidents due to her works, particularly on topics related to anti-communist sentiment and West Papua. In 2016, while conducting an interview at a right-wing symposium on the alleged "revival" of the Communist Party of Indonesia (PKI), Firdaus was expelled by members of the Islamic Defenders Front (FPI) from the event. In 2019, she was a victim of doxing after several anonymous accounts on Twitter published her personal information. The incident led to threats against Firdaus who then delayed the publication of her investigative reports on the Papuan conflict.
