= Bandung Islamic University =

Private university in Bandung, West Java, Indonesia

- Universitas Islam Bandung
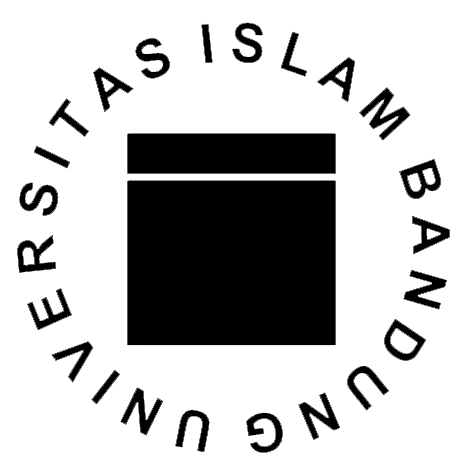
- Logo of UNISBA
- Motto: Mujahid, mujtahid, mujaddid
- Motto in English: Leader, researcher, pioneer
- Type: Private
- Established: 15 November 1958
- Rector: Prof. Dr. H. Muhamad Yogi, B.Sc., B.A., M.A., M.Sc., Ph.D.
- Academic staff: 828 (2014); S1 - 14% S2 - 64% S3 - 22%
- Students: 12.274
- Undergraduates: 10.923
- Postgraduates: 1.154
- Doctoral students: 197
- Location: Jl. Tamansari No.1, 20, 22, 24, 26, Bandung, Indonesia; 6.9036°S 107.6088°E
- Campus: Urban 146.760 meter square (1.579.711,49 sq ft)
- Colors: Blue
- Mascot: Ka'bah
- Website: www.unisba.ac.id

Bandung Islamic University (Indonesian: Universitas Islam Bandung, abbreviated as UNISBA) is one of the oldest private universities in Indonesia based in Bandung, West Java. The purpose of UNISBA is to produce mujahid (leader), mujtahid (researchers) and mujaddid (pioneer) in an Islamic scientific society.

== History ==
In 1957, a number of West Java Muslim leaders along with some scholars who at that time became members of the Constitutional Assembly of Indonesia, initiated the cadre of leaders of the faqih fiddin for the future. On November 15, 1958, the idea was realized through the establishment of the Perguruan Islam Tinggi (PIT), under the Islamic Education Foundation with the Notary Deed of Lie Kwie Nio, number: 42. The founders listed on the Notarial deed are: Prof. Sjafie Soemardja, dr. H. Chasan Boesoiri, Drs. Ahmad Sadali, Oja Somantri, R. Kosasih, R. Sabri Gandanegara, and Dadang Hermawan. The college is intended to meet the needs of the people of West Java, especially for a higher Islamic college in the midst of various college styles at that time. The establishment of this college was fully supported by the people of West Java through members of the West Java Province legislative assembly.

Initially, lectures were held at the Muslimin Building, Jalan PalasariNo. 1, Bandung. A year later, in 1960, academic activities were transferred to Jalan Abdul Muis. 73 Bandung. In 1967, Perguruan Islam Tinggi (PIT) changed to Bandung Islamic University (UNISBA) led by prof. T. M. Soelaeman, M.Sc., EE. Since 1972, all university activities have been held at the Blue Campus, at Jalan Tamansari no. 1 Bandung, on a land area of 10,808 m^{2}, provided by the Municipal Government of Bandung.

With assistance from Muslims, semi-permanent buildings were built for lecture halls, offices, libraries, academic facilities, Mosque, and multipurpose hall. Due to the increasing number of students and more academic programs, in 1980, the Campus II was built in Ciburial Dago, approximately 7 km from Tamansari Campus. The Campus II was built using a donation from H. Amir Machmud (Minister of Home Affairs at that time).

Since 1987, all academic and student activities have been centered on the Tamansari Campus, while Campus II is used for student boarding activities, scientific meetings, upgrading and training.

On 1 September 2025, the campus became part of a student struggle as police stormed the campus grounds against pro-democracy students and protestors during the August 2025 protests.

== Academics ==
=== Admission and selectivity ===
Admission to UNISBA is conducted through entrance examinations (PMB) and PMDK. Each year UNISBA accepts only about 25% of the 10,000 applicants.

=== Accreditation ===
UNISBA obtained accreditation of rank A (Very Good) from the National University Accreditation Board of Higher Education (BAN PT). The accreditation of higher education institutions (AIPT) is obtained in 2017. The accreditation assessment includes 15 indicators covering leadership, student affairs, human resources, curriculum, infrastructure and facilities, funding, governance, management system, learning system, academic atmosphere, quality assurance systems, graduates, research and community service, and study programs.

=== Reputation ===
Based on the Ministry of Research, Technology and Higher Education college ranking (2015), UNISBA ranked 32 out of 3320 universities in Indonesia. Mid-2017, UNISBA won the 1 st winner Internal Quality Assurance System (SPMI) in Indonesia from Ministry of Research, Technology and Higher Education.

UNISBA includes 100 Selection Campus KOMPAS (2017). National Survey of Data and Analysis TEMPO mentioned that UNISBA is one of the favorite Private Universities in Indonesia through 6 study programs namely Law, Communication, Medicine, Psychology, Management and Accounting. Faculty of Communication UNISBA 5 years in a row (2012-2016) to be ranked "Best School of Communication" version of Mix Magazine. Faculty Dirasah (Shari/ah, Dakwah, Tarbiyah) UNISBA is the first rank in the category of the best Faculty of Islam in the environment Kopertais Region II West Java and Banten.

=== Undergraduate program ===
The Islamic University of Bandung has 10 Faculties with 18 Study Programs and 4 Professional Programs:

- Faculty of Shari'ah
  - Law of Sharia Economics
  - Law of Islamic Family
- Faculty of Tarbiyah
  - Islamic education
  - Early childhood education
- Faculty of Dakwah
  - Islamic Communications and Broadcasting
- Faculty of Law
  - Law
- Faculty of Mathematics and Natural Sciences
  - Statistics
  - Mathematics
  - Pharmacy
  - Professional Pharmacist Program
- Faculty of Psychology
  - Psychology
- Faculty of Economics and Business
  - Management
  - Accounting
  - Economics
  - Professional Accountant Program
- Faculty of Engineering
  - Mining Engineering
  - Industrial Engineering
  - Urban and Regional Planning
  - Professional Engineer Program
- Faculty of Communication
  - Communication Studies
- Faculty of Medicine
  - Medicine
  - Professional Medical Program

=== Postgraduate program ===
==== Masters program ====
Bandung Islamic University has eight Masters Study Programs:

- Master of Sharia Economics
  - Concentration of Sharia Finance
  - Concentration of Sharia Banking
  - Concentration of Sharia Business Management
- Master of Islamic Education
  - Concentration of Islamic Education
  - Concentration of Early Childhood Education
  - Concentration of Islamic Education Management
- Master of Law
  - Concentration of Islamic Law
  - Concentration of Health Law
  - Concentration of Criminal Law
  - Concentration of Business Law
  - Concentration of International Law
  - Concentration of State Administration Law
- Master of Notary
- Master of Management
  - Concentration of Hospital Management
  - Concentration of Leadership Management
  - Concentration of Entrepreneurship Management
  - Concentration of Financial Management and Banking
  - Concentration of Sharia Financial Management and Banking
- Master of Professional Psychology
  - Concentration of Clinical Psychology
  - Concentration of Educational Psychology
- Master of Communication Studies
  - Concentration of Business Communication
  - Concentration of Political Communication
  - Concentration Communication Dakwah
- Master of Urban Studies and Planning
  - Concentration of Town Planning Management
  - Concentration of Regional and Rural Planning
  - Concentration of Coastal and Marine / Maritime Planning

==== Doctoral program ====
Bandung Islamic University has one Doctoral Program:

- Doctor of Law

== Notable alumni ==
- Taslim Azis, Indonesian politician, pesilat, interim member of the People's Representative Council in 2019.
- Cindy May McGuire, Indonesian medical doctor, actress, 2022 G20 Ambassador, beauty pageant titleholder who was crowned Puteri Indonesia Lingkungan 2022, Miss International 2022.
- Ahmad Taufik, Indonesian newspaper journalist known for his articles critical of the dictatorship of President Suharto.
- Mohammed Taufiq Johari, Malaysian politician.

== See also ==
- List of Islamic educational institutions
- Mining Engineering Bandung Islamic University
- 2025 UNISBA and UNPAS campus clashes
