= Laksmi De-Neefe Suardana =

Australian-Indonesian author, fashion designer, Miss Universe Indonesia 2022

Laksmi De Neefe Suardana
- ᬮᬓ᭄ᬱ᭄ᬫᬶᬰᬭᬶᬤᬾᬦᬾᬏᬧ᬴ᬾᬲᬸᬯᬃᬤᬦ
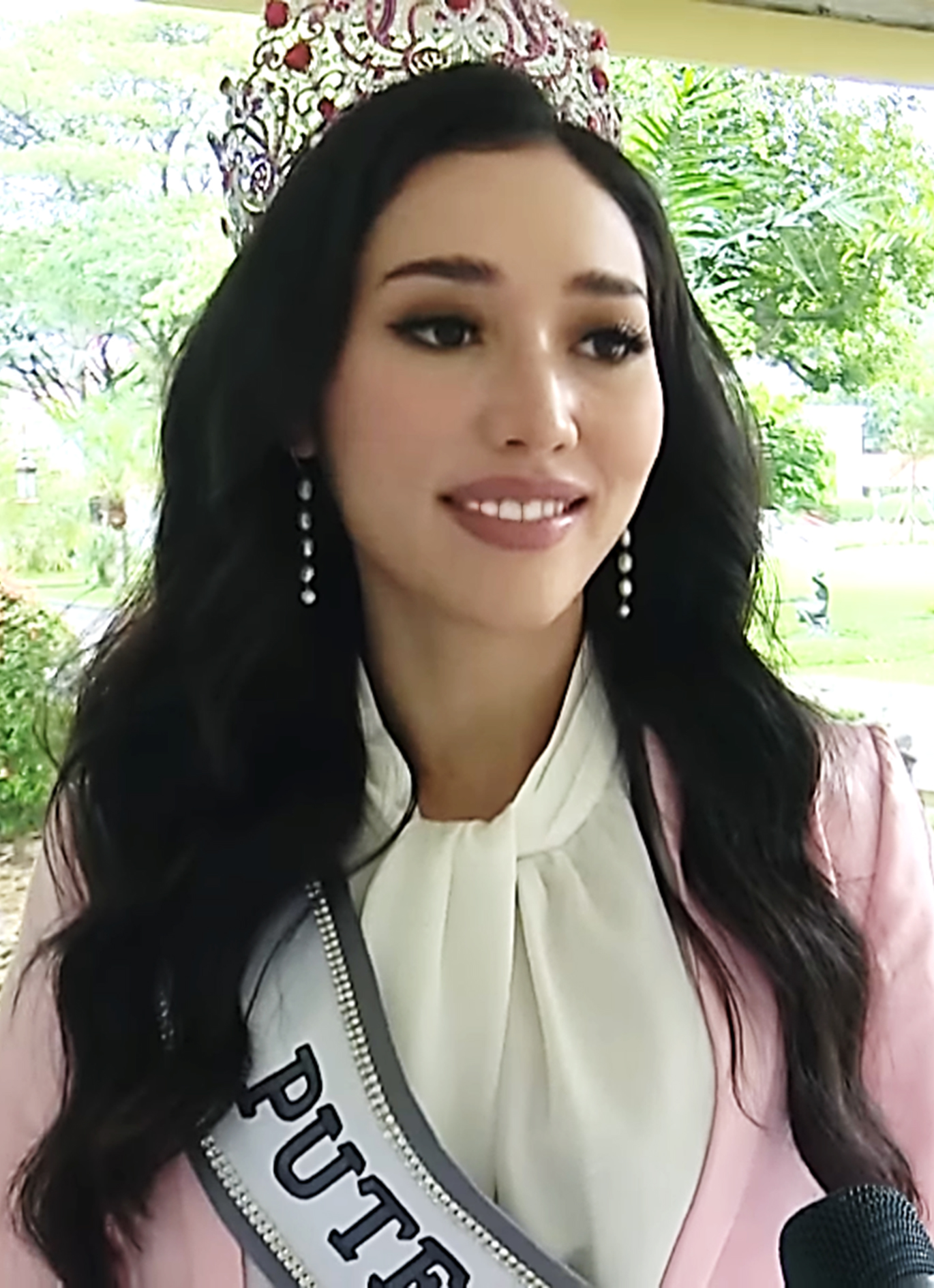
- Suardana as the G20 Ambassador in Merdeka Palace on 31 May 2022
- Born: Laksmi Shari De Neefe Suardana; 29 January 1996 (age 30); Melbourne, Australia
- Education: Polimoda (BBA in Fashion Business); RMIT University (B.Des. in Fashion Design); Monash College (Diploma of Arts)
- Height: 1.76 m (5 ft 9 1/2 in)
- Beauty pageant titleholder
- Title: Puteri Indonesia 2022; Miss Universe Indonesia 2022
- Hair color: Black
- Eye color: Dark Brown
- Major competitions: Puteri Indonesia 2022; (Winner); Miss Universe 2022; (Unplaced)

Signature
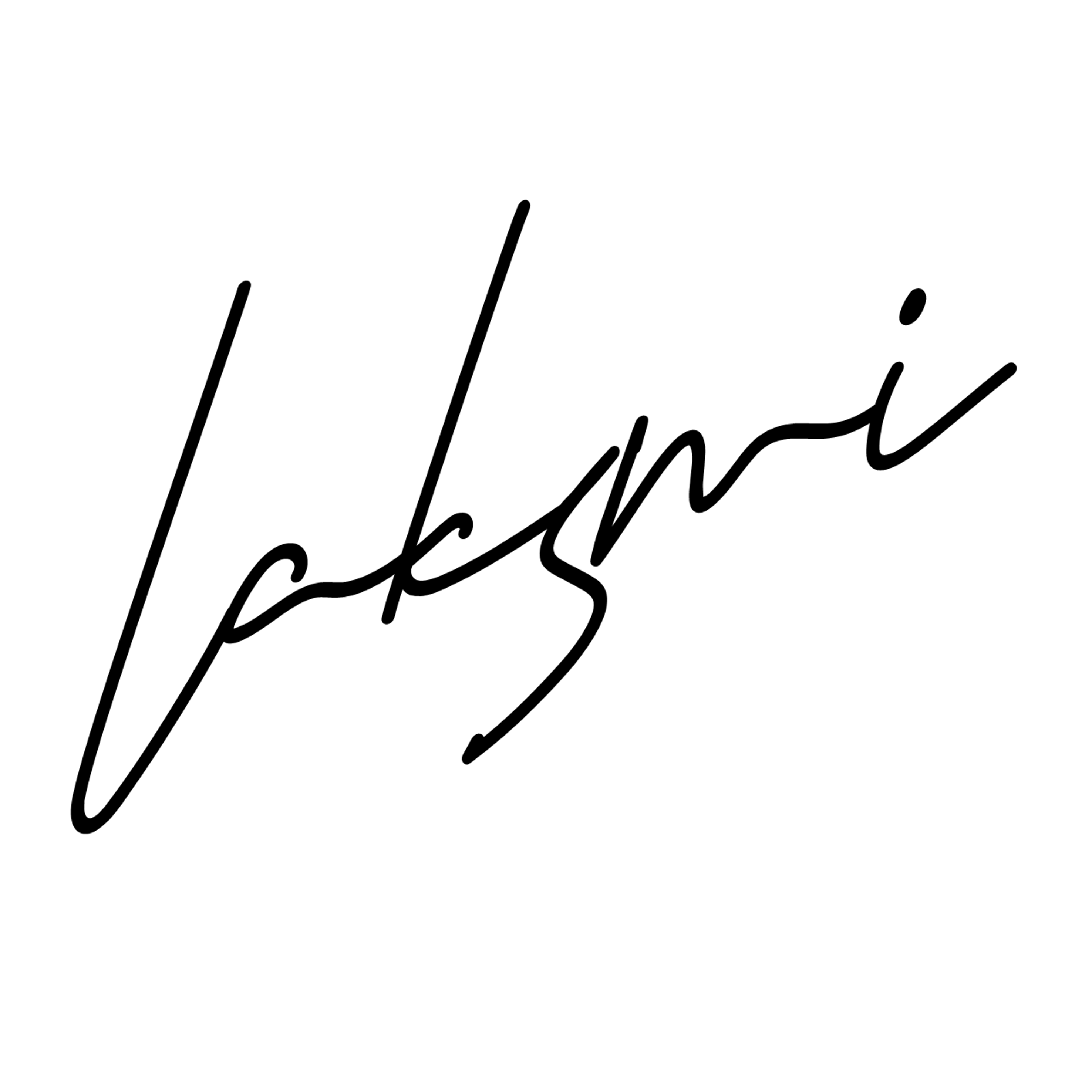

Laksmi Shari De-Neefe Suardana (Balinese: ᬮᬓ᭄ᬱ᭄ᬫᬶᬰᬭᬶᬤᬾᬦᬾᬏᬧ᬴ᬾᬲᬸᬯᬃᬤᬦ), simply known as Laksmi De-Neefe Suardana, is an Australian-born Indonesian fashion designer, author, UNICEF activist, 2022 G20 Ambassador, co-founder of Ubud Writers and Readers Festival, model and beauty pageant titleholder who was crowned Puteri Indonesia 2022. Suardana is the first representative from Bali to be crowned Puteri Indonesia. She represented Indonesia at Miss Universe 2022.

== Early life and education ==
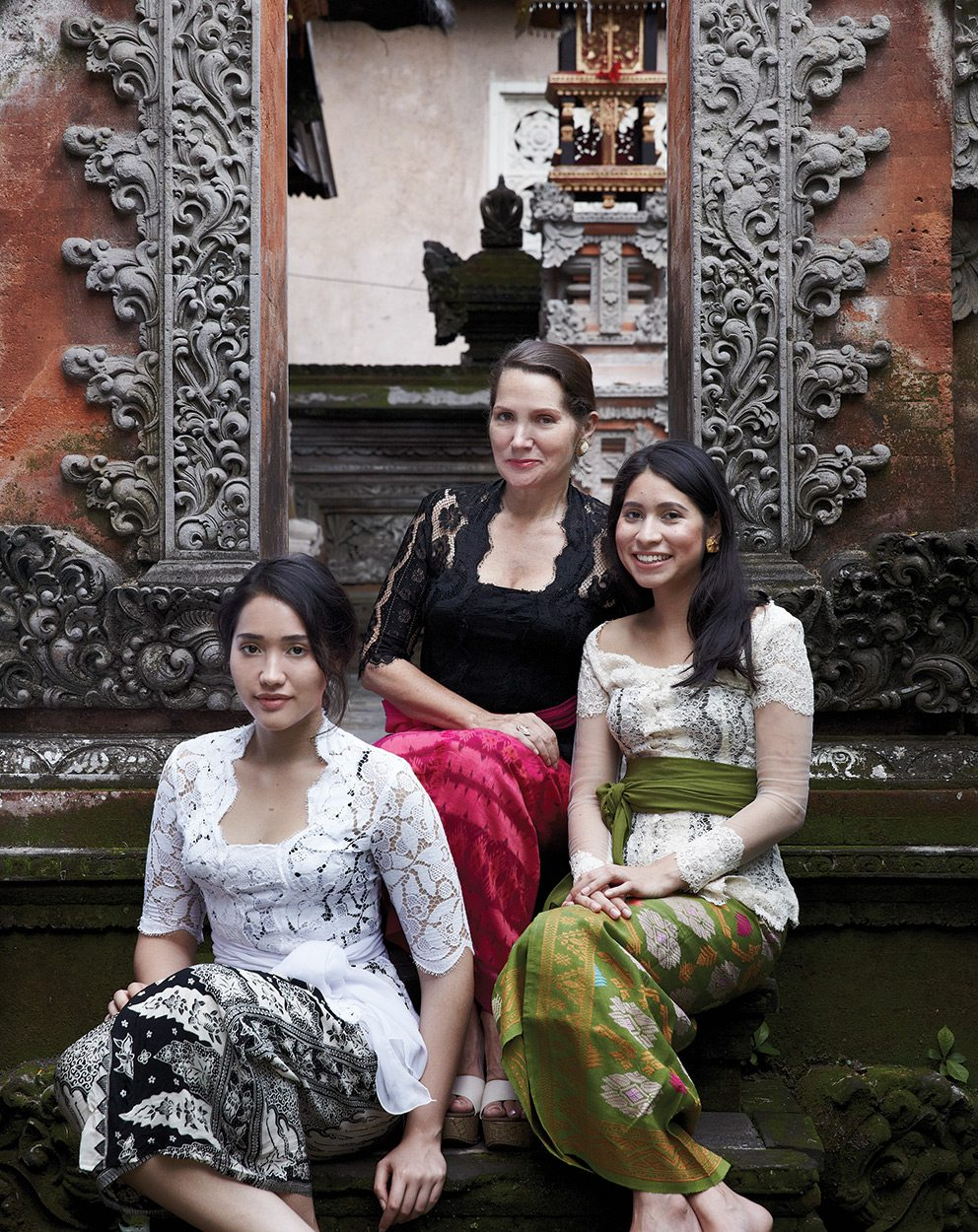
Ubud Writers & Readers Festival founders, Suardana (left), together with her mother Janet De-Neefe (center) and her sister Dewi De-Neefe (right) on 6 October 2018 in Besakih Temple - Bali

Laksmi Shari De-Neefe Suardana was born on 29 January 1996 in Melbourne, Australia, to an Australian mother, Janet De-Neefe, and a Balinese father, Ketut Suardana. She was raised in Ubud, a village located in Gianyar Regency, Bali, Indonesia. She has three siblings. She is the granddaughter of Australian business tycoon, John De-Neefe. Her name was inspired from Lakshmi, a Hindu goddess known for her power to turn dreams into reality. Suardana speaks Indonesian, Balinese, English, Italian, Spanish and French. She learnt Italian while studying and working as a fashion designer in Florence, Italy.

Laksmi received a diploma of arts from Monash College in 2013. She then completed her double degree program, bachelor of design in fashion design from RMIT University in Australia and bachelor of business in fashion from Polimoda, a private fashion school in Italy. She graduated with summa cum-laude.

== Career ==
In 2018, Laksmi took part as an activist and contributor for UNICEF's Voices of Youth. She now actively promotes literacy and literature engagement in the society as her advocacy, knowing that the interest in writing and reading books in Indonesia is still low. She also volunteers to teach English for a non-governmental organization in Bali.

On 31 May 2022, Suardana and her fellow Puteri Indonesia 2022 winners, Cindy May McGuire and Adinda Cresheilla, were appointed as the 2022 G20 Ambassadors by the President of the Republic of Indonesia, Joko Widodo, at the Merdeka Palace, as part of the Indonesian presidency at the upcoming 17th meeting of the G20 in Bali, where the ambassadors were also accompanied by Minister of Tourism and Creative Economy, Sandiaga Uno.

=== Ubud Writers & Readers Festival ===
The Ubud Writers & Readers Festival was first conceived by Suardana, together with her parents as a healing project in response to the first 2002 Bali bombings. It has grown from a very small festival to the largest literary festival in Southeast Asia. In 2020 during the COVID-19 pandemic, Suardana created the Ubud Writers & Readers Fest IG Live Book Club. Suardana was appointed the festival's official ambassador by Yayasan Mudra Swari Saraswati in 2023 in conjunction with the celebration of the festival's twentieth anniversary.

== Pageantry ==
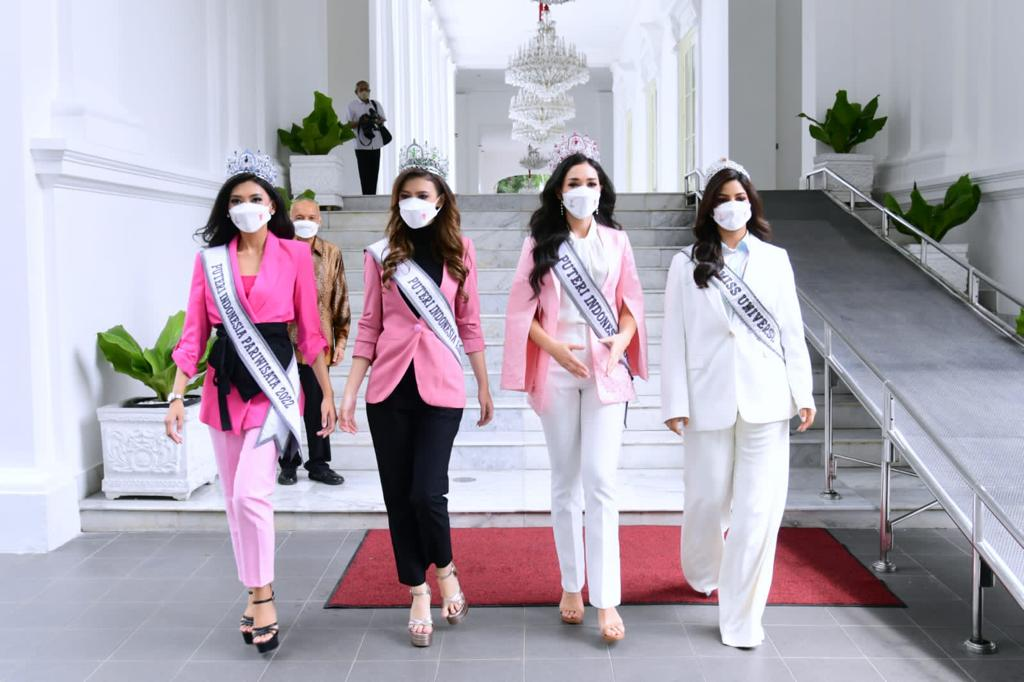
Suardana (second from the right) together with Puteri Indonesia 2022 winners and Miss Universe 2021, Harnaaz Sandhu, visiting Merdeka Palace on 31 May 2022

=== Puteri Bali 2022 ===
In January 2022, she competed for the title of Puteri Bali 2022 through an open audition in Jakarta, ended up winning the title.

=== Puteri Indonesia 2022 ===
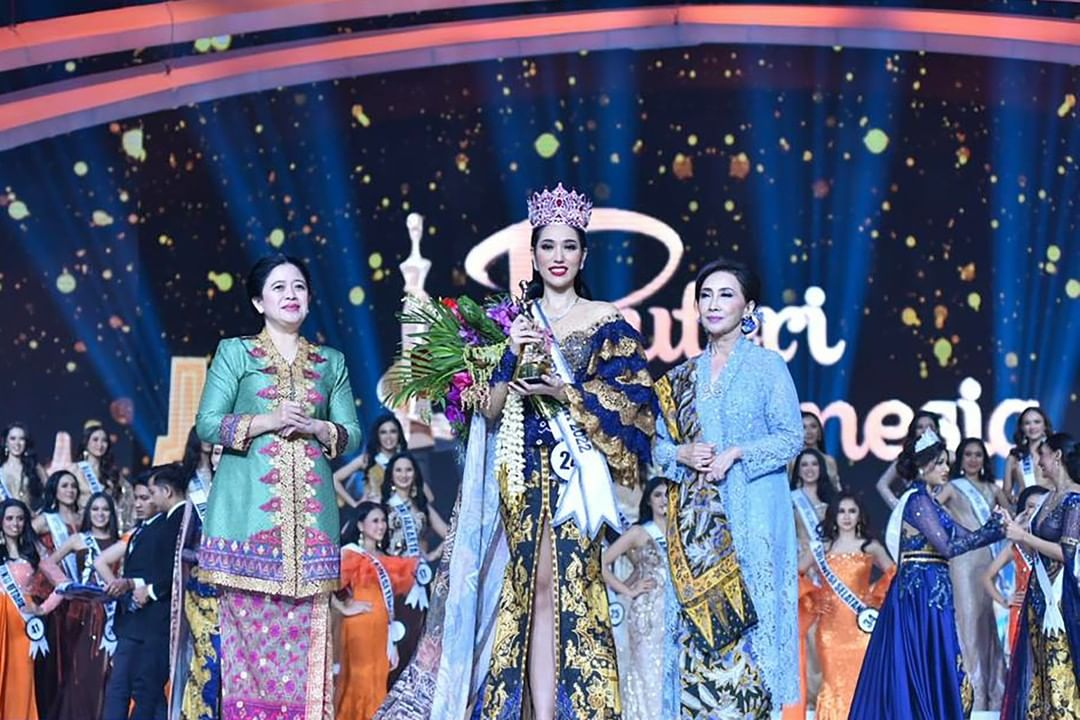
Suardana (middle) being crowned as Puteri Indonesia 2022, together with Puan Maharani and Putri Kuswisnuwardhani

As the winner of Puteri Bali 2022, Suardana represented Bali at Puteri Indonesia 2022 held at the Jakarta Convention Center, Jakarta, Indonesia, on 27 May 2022. Originally, she wore the sash of Bali 1 since there was another candidate from Bali, Jazmine Callista Seymour Rowe, who was publicly voted as one of the official candidates. However, she changed her sash into Bali before the pre-quarantine since Jazmine decided to withdraw for an undisclosed reason.

During the finale, Suardana was asked by Putri Kuswisnuwardhani whether she had any experiences that she would like to change. She answered:

I don't have any experience in my life that I regret however bad it is. I believe that the Universe has made plans for me, and it has helped me grow into a stronger, wiser, and more righteous person. And that is why I can stand here in front of you tonight because of all the experience that has taught me, and it made me a new person and I am courageous, and I know I can conquer anything. Thank you.

At the end of the coronation night, Suardana successfully defeated other 43 delegates from across Indonesia, becoming the first Balinese to win Puteri Indonesia. She was crowned as Puteri Indonesia 2022 by the outgoing titleholder, Raden Roro Ayu Maulida Putri of East Java. Suardana was crowned along with her fellow Puteri Indonesia queens, Cindy May McGuire and Adinda Cresheilla.

=== Miss Universe 2022 ===
As the winner of Puteri Indonesia 2022, Suardana represented Indonesia at the 71st edition of the Miss Universe competition, but was unplaced.

== Filmography ==
Alongside her older sister, Dewi De‑Neefe, Suardana began her acting career in 2010 as an extra in the film adaptation of Eat Pray Love by Elizabeth Gilbert, produced by Columbia Pictures and Plan B Entertainment.

== See also ==
Awards and achievements
| Preceded by Putu Ayu Saraswati | Puteri Bali; 2022 | Succeeded by Anak Agung Sagung Istri Nanda Widya Saraswati |
| Preceded by Raden Roro Ayu Maulida Putri, East Java | Puteri Indonesia; 2022 | Succeeded by Farhana Nariswari Wisandana, West Java |
| Preceded by Raden Roro Ayu Maulida Putri, East Java | Miss Universe Indonesia; 2022 | Succeeded by Fabiënne Nicole Groeneveld, Jakarta SCR |
