= Universitas Pasundan =

Pasundan University
- Other name: UNPAS
- Motto: Pengkuh Agamana, Luhung Elmuna, Jembar Budayana
- Type: Private University
- Established: 14 November 1960; 65 years ago
- Parent institution: Pasundan Higher Education Foundation
- Rector: Prof. Dr. H. Azhar Affandi, S.E., M.Sc.
- Location: Jalan Tamansari No. 6-8, Bandung City, West Java Province, 40116, Indonesia
- Website: www.unpas.ac.id

Universitas Pasundan (English: Pasundan University) is a private university managed by the Pasundan Higher Education Foundation and affiliated with the Pasundan Association. Pasundan University is located in Bandung, West Java, Indonesia.

Pasundan University was founded on 14 November 1960, in Bandung. Its existence and development are inseparable from the goals and ideals of the Pasundan Association, an organisation founded on 20 July 20 1913, namely the dedication of the Pasundan Association to improving the lives of the Indonesian people for the welfare of the Indonesian people.

Pasundan University has campuses in four locations, namely:

1. Jalan Lengkong Besar No. 68 (Campus I)
2. Jalan Tamansari No. 6-8 (Campus II and Rectorate Building)
3. Jalan Dr. Setiabudi No. 193 (Campus III)
4. Jalan Sumatera No. 41 (Campus IV and the Pasundan Association Executive Board Building)

== History ==
On 1 September 2025, police stormed the campus after pro-democracy students and protestors seek refuge during the August 2025 Protests.

== See also ==
- List of universities in Indonesia
