= Taslim Azis =

Indonesian pesilat and politician (1964–2021)

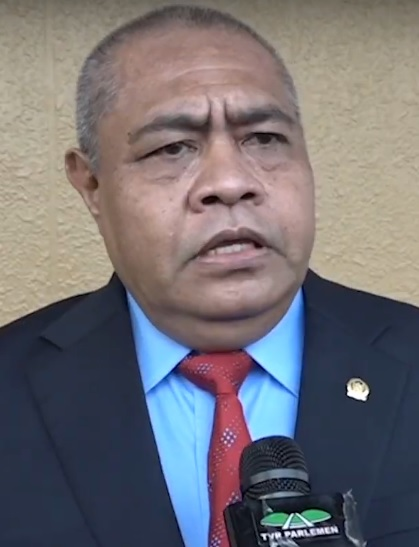
- Azis in 2019

Member of the People's Representative Council
- In office 13 February 2019 – 1 October 2019

Personal details
- Born: 23 June 1964 Ambon Island, Indonesia
- Died: 28 February 2021 (aged 56) Jakarta, Indonesia
- Party: Great Indonesia Movement Party

Taslim Azis (23 June 1964 – 28 February 2021) was an Indonesian politician and pesilat. He was an interim member of the People's Representative Council in 2019.

== Biography ==
Azis was born on Ambon Island to Ali Bali and Samida Azis. After his secondary studies, he moved to Bandung to attend Bandung Islamic University. He graduated with a degree in mining engineering in 1994. During his university studies, he participated in Indonesian student sports week, winning a gold medal in shotput. He also boxed, but his mother forbade him from engaging in the sport after he sent one opponent to hospital.

In 1985, Azis finished training in pencak silat. The following year, he won the Indonesian Student Silat Invitation Championship in Bandung. He was a gold medalist in the Southeast Asian Games and in Indonesian National Sports Week. He won the World Pencak Silat Championship in 1990, 1992, and 1994. He was Southeast Asian champion in 1991 in Manila, 1993 in Singapore, 1995 in Chiang Mai, and 1997 in Jakarta. He represented West Java in National Sports Week, winning gold medals in 1989, 1993, and 1996. He was part of the 70–75 kg weight class. After he retired as a fighter, he continued to coach as a member of the Indonesian Pencak Silat Association.

Azis was a member of the Great Indonesia Movement Party and worked as a Deputy Secretary General for the party. He ran in the 2014 Indonesian legislative election but was defeated. However, he gained a temporary seat on the People's Representative Council in 2019 upon the resignation of Amrullah Amri Tuasikal. He was sworn in on 13 February 2019 and served the remainder of the term. While on the council, he was part of the Energy, Research, Technology, and Environment Commission. In the 2019 Indonesian legislative election, he was defeated in his bid for reelection, gaining only 19,835 votes.

Taslim Azis died in Jakarta on 28 February 2021 at the age of 56.
