= Cindy May McGuire =

Indonesian model

- ᮞᮤᮔ᮪ᮓᮤᮙᮦᮚ᮪ᮙᮨᮌᮭᮚᮨᮁ
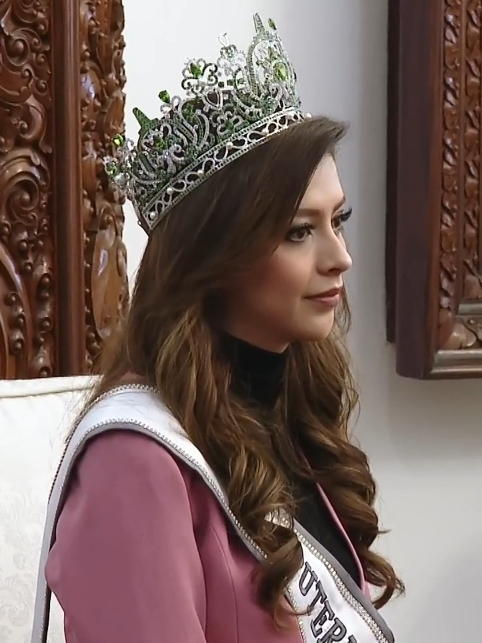
- McGuire in 2022
- Born: Cindy May McGuire; Cirebon, West Java, Indonesia
- Education: University of New South Wales (MHL in Health Leadership and Management and MIDI in Infectious Diseases Intelligence); Bandung Islamic University (BM in Professional Medical Program and MD)
- Beauty pageant titleholder
- Title: Puteri Indonesia Lingkungan 2022; Miss International Indonesia 2022
- Major competitions: Puteri Indonesia 2022; (1st Runner-up – Puteri Indonesia Lingkungan); Miss International 2022; (Unplaced)

Signature
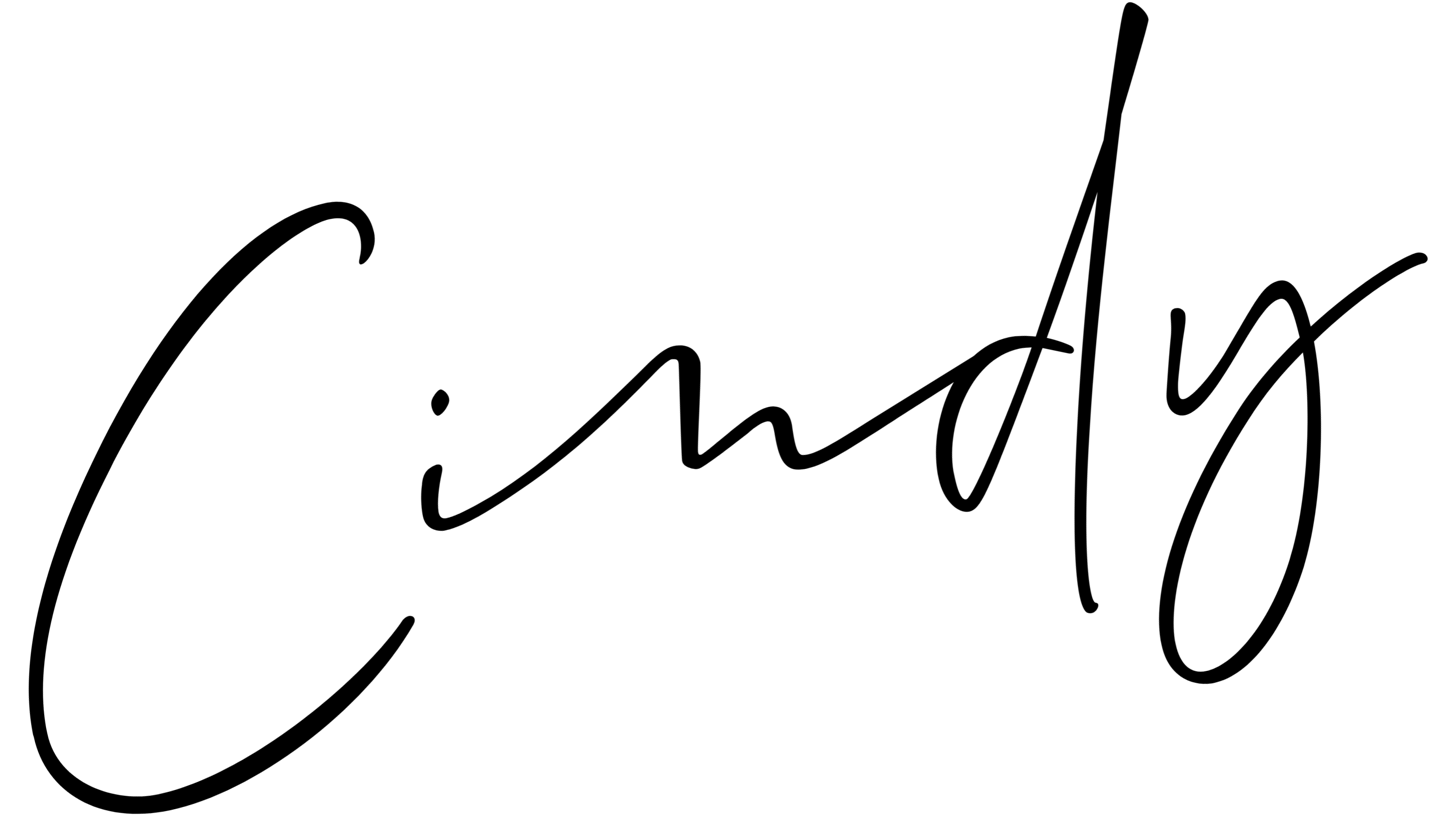

Cindy May McGuire (/məˈɡwaɪər/ mə-GWIRE) is an Indonesian beauty pageant titleholder who was crowned Puteri Indonesia Lingkungan 2022. She was also a 2022 G20 Ambassador in this role. She represented Indonesia in the Miss International 2022 pageant held in Tokyo, Japan.

== Early life and education ==
McGuire was born in Cirebon, West Java, Indonesia to an American father Lex R McGuire from Philadelphia, Pennsylvania, and a Sundanese-Betawis mother Nelly Yulistine from Ciamis Regency, West Java. She grew up in several countries: the United States, United Arab Emirates, Netherlands, Australia, Singapore, as well as Bandung and Ciamis in West Java, Indonesia.

McGuire studied at Leongatha Secondary College in Leongatha, Victoria, Australia. She completed her Bachelor of Medicine (BM) in Professional Medical Program and a Doctor of Medicine (MD) from the Bandung Islamic University in Bandung, West Java. She is currently pursuing a Double master's degree program, Master of Health Leadership and Management (MHL) and Master of Infectious Diseases Intelligence (MIDI) from the University of New South Wales in Sydney, Australia.

== Career ==
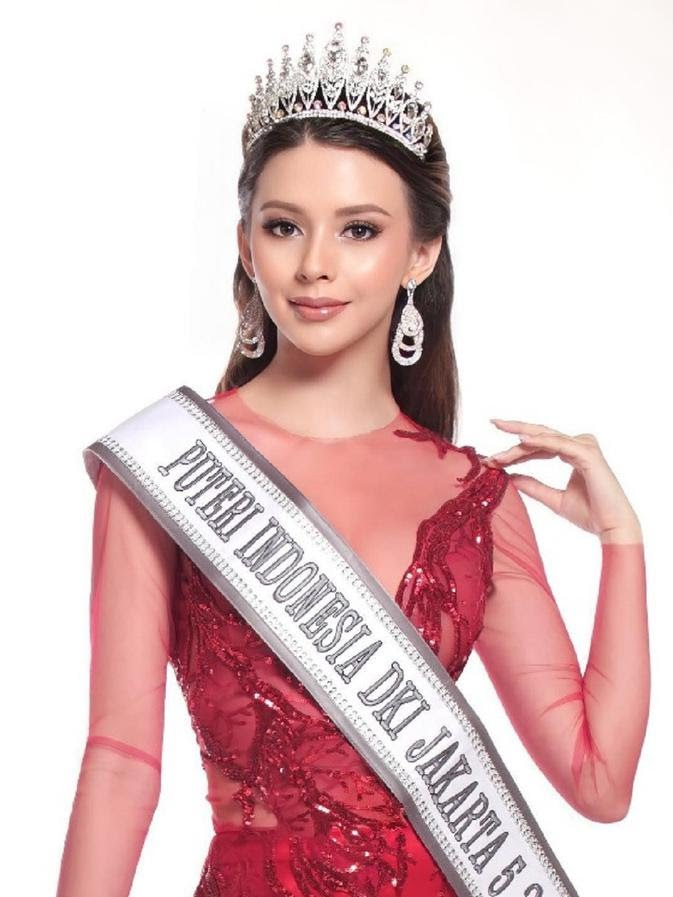
McGuire as Puteri Jakarta SCR-5 2022 on 29 May 2022.

On 31 May 2022, together with her fellow Puteri Indonesia 2022 winners, Laksmi Shari De-Neefe Suardana and Adinda Cresheilla, McGuire was appointed as the 2022 G20 Ambassador by the President of the Republic of Indonesia, Joko Widodo, at the Merdeka Palace, as part of the Indonesian presidency at the upcoming seventeenth meeting of the Group of Twenty (G20) in Bali, where the ambassadors also accompanied by Minister of Tourism and Creative Economy, Sandiaga Uno.

== Pageantry ==
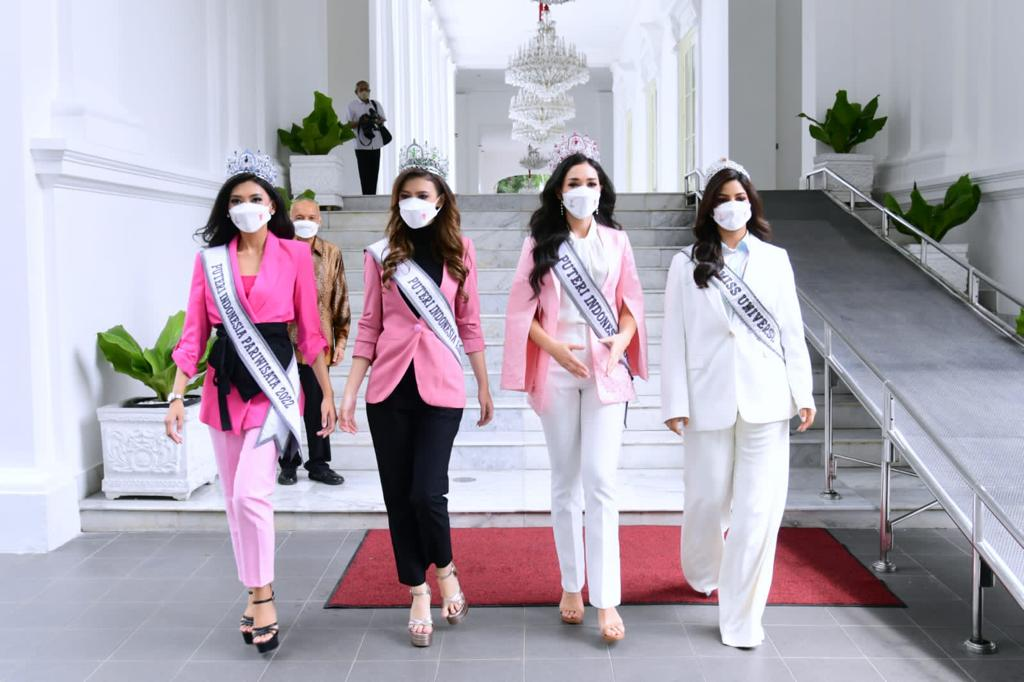
McGuire (second from the left) together with Puteri Indonesia 2022 winners and Miss Universe 2021, Harnaaz Sandhu, visiting Merdeka Palace on 31 May 2022.

=== Miss Tourism World Indonesia 2021 ===
At the end of 2020, the Miss Tourism World Indonesia organization officially announced that they had appointed McGuire as Miss Tourism World Indonesia 2021. Due to the COVID-19 pandemic the Miss Tourism World organization has canceled the annual international pageant, which going to be held in Antalya, Turkey.

=== Puteri Jakarta SCR 2022 ===
In 2022, McGuire participated in the Puteri Jakarta SCR 2022, where she was successfully selected as the representative of Jakarta SCR-5.

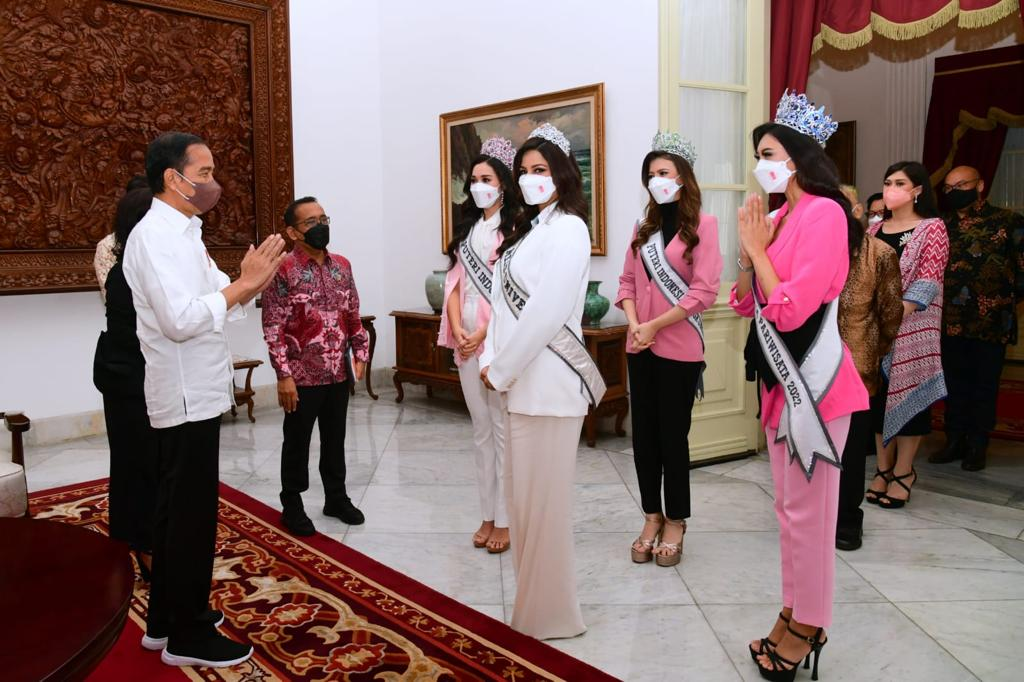
McGuire (second from the right) together with Puteri Indonesia 2022 winners and Miss Universe 2021, Harnaaz Sandhu, received a warm welcome from the President of The Republic of Indonesia, Joko Widodo on 31 May 2022.

=== Puteri Indonesia 2022 ===
As the winner of Jakarta SCR-5, she represented Jakarta SCR-5 at the national pageant of Puteri Indonesia 2022, held in Jakarta Convention Center, Jakarta, Indonesia, on 27 May 2022. During the pageant quarantine, she was selected as one of the 3 winners for the "Miss Talent" award, with her Beksi Silat performance.

During the finale, McGuire was asked by Minister of Health of The Republic of Indonesia, Budi Gunadi Sadikin whether she has any solution that she would like to change to bring awareness for stunted growth prevalence. She answered,

The way the solution for this is to give education, to provide education about the proper nutritions for pregnant and lactating women, and for the economic solution, we can give a training for each individual in order to maximize their potential. Thank you.

At the end of the event, she was successfully crowned as the winner of "Puteri Indonesia Lingkungan 2022" by her predecessor Puteri Indonesia Lingkungan 2020, Putu Ayu Saraswati of Bali. McGuire was crowned along with her fellow Puteri Indonesia 2022 titleholders; Laksmi Shari De-Neefe Suardana and Adinda Cresheilla.

During the finale coronation night, Putu Ayu Saraswati announced that she was withdrawing from the Miss International competition, and handed over her duties as Miss International Indonesia 2022 to McGuire. The coronation night was attended by Miss International 2019, Sireethorn Leearamwat of Thailand who sit as the selection committee.

=== Miss International 2022 ===
As the winner of Puteri Indonesia Lingkungan 2022, McGuire represented Indonesia at the 60th edition of the Miss International competition, held at Tokyo Dome City Hall, Tokyo, Japan on December 13, 2022, and was unplaced.

== Filmography ==
McGuire began her acting career in the Television show Opera Van Java in 2020, Anak Sekolah in 2021, and Lapor Pak! in 2021, which produced and aired by Trans7.

=== Television shows ===
Year	Title	Genre	Role	Production	Ref.
2020–2021	Opera Van Java	Wayang wong – Sitcom	as herself	Trans7	
2021–present	Anak Sekolah	Drama – Sitcom	as herself	Trans7	
2021–2022	Lapor Pak!	Drama – Sitcom	as herself	Trans7	
2022	Puteri Indonesia 2022	Beauty Pageant	Contestant	SCTV	
2022	Insert Siang	Talk Show	Guest star	Trans TV	
2023	Puteri Indonesia 2023	Beauty Pageant	Puteri Indonesia Lingkungan 2022	SCTV	
2023, 2025	Hidup Sehat	Health Talk Show	Guest star	tvOne	
2023	Dokter Traveler	Travel – Medical Talk Show	Host	Trans TV	
2023	Family 100	Game Show	Guest star	MNCTV	
2024	Dream Box Indonesia	Game Show	Guest star	Trans TV	
2024	Bikin Asik Aja	Variety Show	Guest star	TVRI	
2024	Ketoprak Milenial	Traditional Drama – Sitcom	Guest star	TVRI	
2024–present	Halo Dokter!	Health Talk Show	Host	TVRI	
2024	Jendela Rumah Kita Season 2	Family Drama	as Dr. Cindy	TVRI	
2025	Marbot Ali	Drama	as Dr. Cindy	TVRI	
2025	Asmara Gen Z	Drama – Soap opera	Bianca's mother	SCTV	
2026	Di Luar Nurul	Drama – Romance	Ratu	Screenplay Films	
2026–present	Hai Dok	Health Talk Show	Host	Trans TV	

Awards and achievements
Preceded by Hillary Masrin	Puteri Jakarta SCR-5; 2022	Succeeded by Fidelia Prabajati
Preceded by Putu Ayu Saraswati	Puteri Indonesia Lingkungan; 2022	Succeeded by Yasinta Aurellia
Preceded by Jolene Marie Cholock-Rotinsulu	Miss International Indonesia; 2022	Succeeded by Farhana Nariswari Wisandana
