= 2025 UNISBA and UNPAS campus clashes =

2025 clash between protesters and police at the UNISBA and UNPAS campus

2025 UNISBA–UNPAS campus clashes
- Part of the August 2025 Indonesian protests
- Protestors and students clash with the police at UNISBA–UNPAS campus grounds
- Date: 1–2 September 2025; 1 day ~21:30–01:45 WIB (2 September)
- Location: Universitas Islam Bandung (UNISBA) & Universitas Pasundan (UNPAS), Tamansari, Bandung, West Java, Indonesia
- Caused by: Night-time clashes on Tamansari road near UNISBA–UNPAS during protest wave; police move to clear alleged “anarchist” roadblocks
- Goals: Protesters: Refuge and medical aid on campus Police: Disperse crowds and secure Tamansari corridor
- Methods: Tear gas; riot control patrols; barricades; campus medical posts and evacuations
- Status: Dispersal of crowds; campuses affected by tear gas; official denials of incursion disputed
- Result: Crowds dispersed; injuries reported among students and staff; calls for investigation by rights groups

Parties
Protesters and students Volunteer medics/first-aiders	West Java Regional Police; Brimob) Kodam III/Siliwangi; Municipal Police

Injuries and arrests
- Injuries: c. 62‒208 injured/overcome by gas; several hospitalized
- Arrested: 16 initially detained; further arrests announced later

The 2025 UNISBA–UNPAS campus clashes, also known as the Unisba-Unpas Incident (Indonesian: Insiden Unisba-Unpas), refers to the late-night use of tear gas by Indonesian security forces around the campuses of the Universitas Islam Bandung (UNISBA) and Universitas Pasundan (UNPAS) on 1 September 2025 amid the August–September 2025 Indonesian protests. Police stated that tear gas was aimed at crowds on Jalan Tamansari to disperse alleged “anarchist” elements and that no officers entered campus grounds, while student leaders and eyewitnesses alleged volleys were directed toward campus areas, affecting medical posts and student facilities. The incident drew condemnation from rights groups; Amnesty International Indonesia urged investigations into protest-related deaths and criticized the firing of tear gas affecting the UNISBA–UNPAS campuses.

== Clashes ==
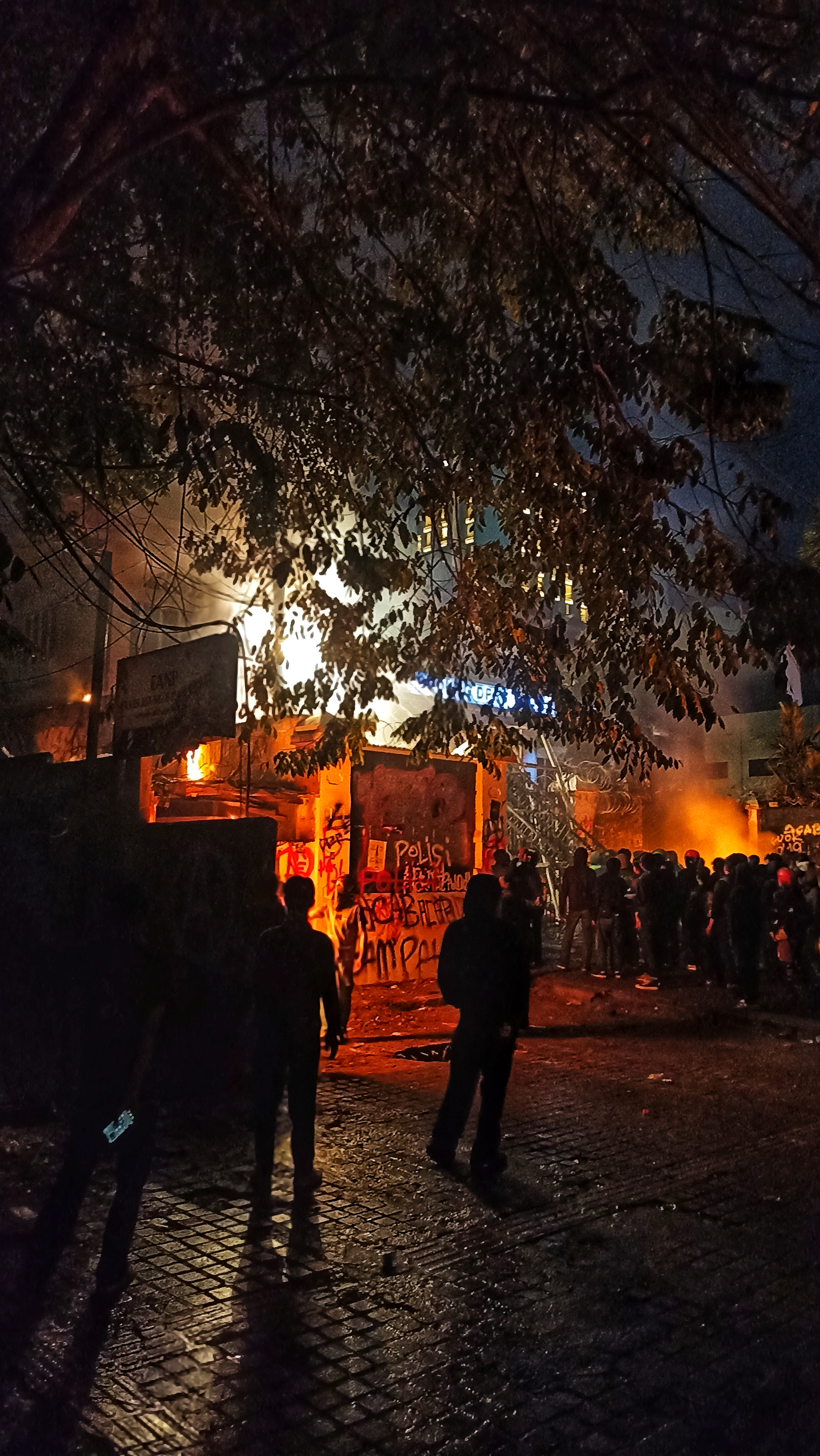
West Java parliament after being torched by protesters

The wave of student demonstrations in Bandung peaked on Monday, 1 September 2025. After the demonstration in front of the West Java Regional Representative Council building ended in the afternoon at around 5–6 p.m., some of the students returned to the campuses of Bandung Islamic University (UNISBA) and Pasundan University (UNPAS) on Tamansari Street. The UNISBA and UNPAS campuses had served as emergency medical posts to treat protesters who were injured or affected by tear gas since the demonstrations began that week. The university even allowed the Youth Red Cross (KSR PMI) team and medical volunteers to set up a post on campus since 30 August. Students from various universities used the UNPAS/UNISBA area as a gathering and evacuation point, so on the night of the incident, many people took refuge there, not just UNPAS or UNISBA students. Meanwhile, security forces consisted of personnel from the West Java Regional Police, Bandung Municipal Police, Mobile Brigade Corps (Brimob), and support from the Siliwangi Military Command.

Map of the clashes

That evening, around 9:30 PM local time, unrest began in the Tamansari Street area near the two campuses. According to police reports, large-scale joint TNI–Polri patrols combed the streets of Bandung after dispersing the crowd at the West Java Regional House of Representatives, then encountered an "illegal blockade" on Tamansari Street, which attracted police towards the campus area. The authorities said that a group of 'anarchists' dressed in black provoked the officers by throwing molotov cocktails at them from inside the UNISBA area. In response, the riot police fired tear gas to disperse the crowd on the highway.

Police entering UNISBA Campus Tamansari, Bandung. Students reportedly tried to barricade themselves within campus buildings.

TNI Anoa blocking an entry point to UNISBA campus.

As midnight approached, the situation around the UNISBA and UNPAS campuses became tense. At around 11:30–11:40 p.m., joint police and military forces began firing tear gas at the two campuses. CCTV footage circulating online showed fully armed Brimob and TNI personnel combing the Tamansari area up to the front of the campus, accompanied by armoured tactical vehicles patrolling around the gates. Students who were still in the campus area panicked and ran for shelter inside the building, while shouts of protest against the authorities' actions could be heard: "Hey, this is a campus!... This is the UNPAS Campus!". The authorities continued to fire tear gas until past midnight, and the unrest only subsided in the early hours of 2 September 2025 at around 01:00 WIB.

Student representatives accused the authorities of storming into the campus and deliberately firing tear gas into the campus. The president of the UNPAS Student Executive Board, Ridho Dawam, stated that at 23:30 WIB, police and TNI officers entered the UNPAS campus and fired more than 30 tear gas canisters at a crowd of students, the medical post, and even the Student Activity Unit (UKM) secretariat. Several amateur videos also captured students shouting: ‘Ditembakeunna ka dieu, bos!’ (meaning ‘They're shooting at us [the campus]’), confirming that the tear gas was indeed directed at the campus area. In addition to tear gas, a number of reports mentioned that the authorities carried batons and shields; however, the police denied that there was any other violence, such as rubber bullet fire, that night. West Java Police Public Relations Officer, Senior Commissioner Hendra Rochmawan, claimed that the tear gas was aimed at the crowd on the road, but the tear gas was "blown by the wind" into the campus. The police's official statement insisted that no officers entered the campus and no rubber bullets were used. Unisba rector, Harits Nu'man, also supported his statement, saying that the joint TNI-Polri patrol team did not enter the campus area.

== Aftermath ==
In the tear gas shooting incident on this campus, dozens of people were injured. At least 12 students were reported to have fainted after inhaling tear gas directly and were evacuated to the campus building to receive medical assistance. Many others experienced shortness of breath, sore eyes, and panic. According to the President of BEM UNISBA, around 10–20 people suffered minor injuries and respiratory problems, including a campus security guard who was hit by a tear gas canister directly in the chest. The victims who fainted and were injured were treated by the campus medical team and volunteers, assisted by local residents who came to bring water and even applied toothpaste around the victims' eyes to reduce the pain caused by the gas. There were no fatalities in this incident, but several students were reported to have experienced trauma and shock until the following day.

The physical impact on campus facilities was also evident. At the UNPAS Tamansari Campus, a number of windows were broken by tear gas canisters fired at the building. The wall panels of one of the buildings were damaged and punctured, presumably by tear gas projectiles. A student's motorbike parked outside the campus gate was also burned during the riots. The next morning, campus security officers and students collected tear gas canisters scattered across the grounds. At least 48 empty canisters were found within the UNPAS and UNISBA campus areas after the incident, a number that indicates the large volume of shots fired by the authorities that night. These numerous tear gas canisters have been secured as evidence by the campus and will be used as the basis for a report of violations.

The police spokesperson stated that during this patrol operation, they successfully arrested several suspects.Two of whom were involved in this incident found out carrying a softgun filled with marbles and marijuana.

== See also ==
- Trisakti shootings
- 2019 Hong Kong Polytechnic University campus conflict
- Siege of the Chinese University of Hong Kong
