= Mining Engineering Bandung Islamic University =

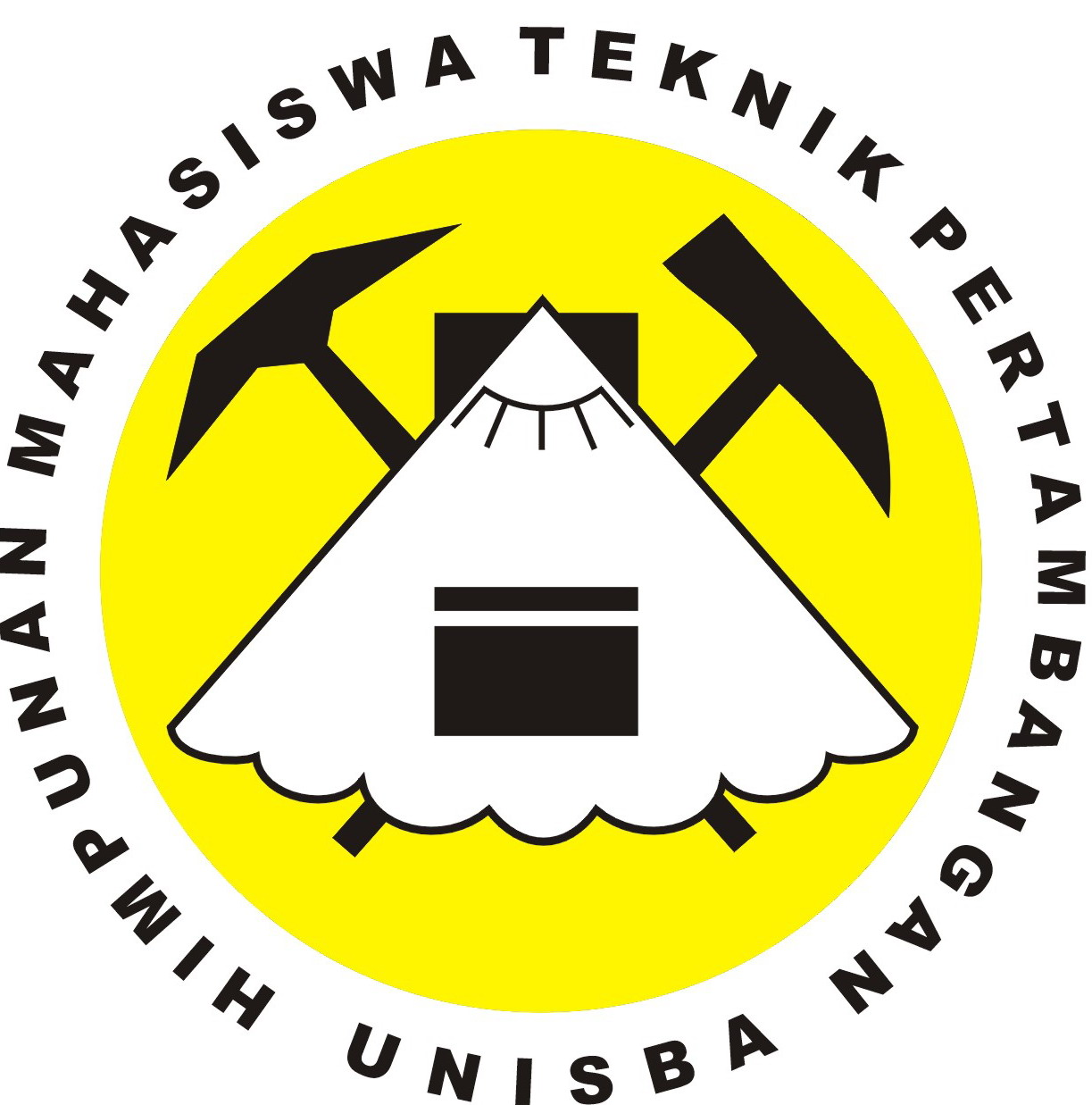
- Bandung Islamic University
- Motto: Tauladan dalam Dedikasi
- Established: January 1979
- Location: Office Jl. Tamansari No.1, 20, 22, 24, 26 Bandung, Bandung, Indonesia
- Campus: Urban 61,881 m^{2} (666,080 sq ft)
- Colors: Yellow
- Website: www.unisba.ac.id

The department of Mining Engineering at Bandung Islamic University (Unisba) was established in January 1979 by the Islamic Education Foundation (YPI), with the name of the People's Mining Department under the auspices of the Faculty Technology Development Society (FTPM) Unisba.

== History ==
With the release of the Rector's Decree No. Unisba. 173/D-1/Rek/1985, Department of Mines, Department of the People's Mining changed its name to mine. Later in the year 1985 according to a registered status of Education and Culture Minister of Republic of Indonesia. 022/0/1985, 07 Mei 1985, on the Granting of listed status to the Department of Mining, Faculty of Engineering within the Islamic University of Bandung in Bandung, which later renamed Mining Engineering. In 1992 the Department / Mining Engineering Program gain recognized status, the Education Minister of the Republic of Indonesia Decree, No. 015/0/1992, dated January 2, 1992, on the Granting of Status admitted to the Faculty / Department / Program of Environmental Studies at the Islamic University of Bandung in Bandung. In subsequent developments, the National Agency for Higher Education Accreditation (BAN - PT) Director General of Higher Education, Ministry of P & K through SK Number: 002/BAN-PT/Ak-II/XII/1998, dated December 22, 1998, about the results and the rating of Accreditation Program Studies for the Undergraduate Program in Higher Education, accreditation rank "B" at the Department of Mining Engineering, Faculty of Engineering, a Certificate of Accreditation Unisba BAN - PT, No. 01693/Ak-II.1 / UIBXAP/XII/1998.
