= Melanie Berentz =

Indonesian actress and beauty pageant titleholder (b. 1999)

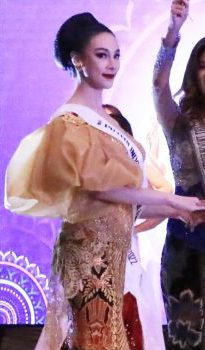
- Berentz in 2022
- Born: Melanie Theresia Berentz; September 7, 1999 (age 27); Novena, Singapore
- Education: Institut Komunikasi dan Bisnis LSPR; Harvard University
- Height: 1.70 m (5 ft 7 in)
- Beauty pageant titleholder
- Title: Puteri West Java 2022
- Hair color: Dark Brown
- Eye color: Hazel Brown
- Major competitions: Puteri West Java 2022 (winner); Puteri Indonesia 2022 (3rd runner-up)

Melanie Theresia Berentz (born 7 September 1999) is an Indonesian actress, and beauty pageant titleholder, who was crowned Puteri Indonesia West Java 2022, She represented West Java at the Puteri Indonesia 2022 pageant, finishing in the top six.

== Early life and career ==
Berentz was born on September 7, 1999, in Mount Elizabeth Hospital, Novena, Singapore, to a Sundanese-Chinese mother Melinda Antoinette from Bandung, West Java and a German father, Marcopoli Heinrich Berentz from München, Bavaria, Germany. The family later moved from Singapore, Dubai and München before settling in Bandung when she was 12 years old.

She worked as a commercial model before starring in the film SIN together with Bryan Elmi Domani.

== Pageantry ==
=== Puteri West Java 2022 and Puteri Indonesia 2022 ===
Berentz's first contest was provincial level, at Puteri Indonesia West Java, held on 17 January 2022, where she was the third runner-up. She later won Puteri Indonesia West Java 2022, Berentz then represented the province of West Java at Puteri Indonesia 2022, on May 27, 2022, at the Jakarta Convention Centre, finishing in the top six.

== Filmography ==
=== Movies ===
Year	Title	Role	Film Production	Ref.
2019	SIN	Daisy	Falcon Pictures	
2019	Rumput Tetangga	Tina Cempaka	RA Pictures	
2020	4 Mantan	Airin	RA Pictures	

=== Television films ===
Year	Title	Role	Network
2018	Cewek Tukang Kayu Ketemu Jodoh "Carpenter Falling in Love"	as Leila	Indosiar
2019	Cintaku Terhalang Jarak "My Love is Blocked by Distance"	as Gina	Indosiar

== See also ==
- Puteri Indonesia
- Puteri Indonesia 2022

Awards and achievements
Preceded by Jeanatasia Kurniasari	Puteri West Java; 2022	Incumbent
