= Ahmad Taufik =

Indonesian newspaper journalist (1965-2017)

Ahmad Taufik Al-Jufri
- Born: 12 July 1965; Jakarta, Indonesia
- Died: 23 March 2017 (aged 51); Jakarta
- Other name: Ate
- Education: B.A, Bandung Islamic University; M.A in International Relations, University of Indonesia
- Occupation: Journalist
- Years active: 1986 - 2017
- Spouse: Syafai'liyin
- Awards: Tasrief Award - Indonesia Press Freedom award (1995), Digul Award-Indonesia NGO's Human Rights Award (1996), International Press Freedom Award (1995), Hellmann/ Hammet Award from American Writer, New York (1998)

Ahmad Taufik (pronounced [ˌahmat̪̚ ˈt̪aufɪʔ]); 12 July 1965 – 23 March 2017) was an Indonesian newspaper journalist known for his articles critical of the dictatorship of President Suharto.

Taufik worked as a reporter at the magazine Tempo until its banning by Information Minister Harmoko of Suharto's New Order government in 1994. This prohibition set off "nationwide demonstrations and international condemnation".

After the magazine's dissolution, Taufik joined other journalists in founding the Alliance of Independent Journalists (AJI), a group which Suharto's government refused to recognize. He later served as the group's president. He was also the director of Voice of Palestine in Indonesia.

== Biography ==
Taufik was born on 12 July 1965 in Jakarta from family of Hadhrami descents. After finishing his high school at SMAN 24, he continued his study at Bandung Islamic University and graduated with a bachelor's degree in law. While in university he participated in some student protests against the Badega Land Case. He finished his master program in International Relations at Padjadjaran University not long before died.

=== Arrest and imprisonment ===
On 16 March 1995, following a series of articles in AJI's news magazine Independen on the presidential succession and Suharto's great personal wealth, Taufik was arrested. He was subsequently charged under Article 19 of the press law, which bans the publication of an unlicensed newspaper or magazine, and Article 154 of the criminal code, which forbids the publication of "feelings of hostility, hatred or contempt toward the government". As he explained to The New York Times, to publish, "you have to have a permit from the Ministry of Information... we didn't have a permit, because we don't agree with that. We refused."

On 1 September 1995, he was convicted of both charges and sentenced to a three-year prison term. The Committee to Protect Journalists protested his arrest and that of other journalists, and named Suharto "one of 10 worst enemies of the press" on its annual list. Taufik was paroled on 19 July 1997, having served two thirds of his sentence.

Taufik spent his sentence in five different prisons: the Jakarta District Police station, Salemba Prison, Cipinang Prison, Cirebon Prison, and Kuningan Prison. While in Cipinang Prison, Taufik became close with Xanana Gusmão, future President of East Timor. He was also visited by Jens Linde of the International Federation of Journalists.

On 22 July 1995, he received the Suardi Tasrif award of the AJI. That same year, he won the International Press Freedom Award of the Committee to Protect Journalists. Due to his sentence, he was unable to receive the award in person until November 1997, following his release from prison. The following year he received the Digul Award.

=== Winata case ===
Taufik later returned to Tempo after it resumed publication. In a 3 March 2003 article that would spark numerous controversies, Taufik raised questions about the involvement of Tomy Winata—described as "one of Indonesia's most powerful businessmen"—in the burning of the Tanah Abang textile market in Jakarta, a fire from which Winata allegedly stood to profit. According to Taufik, he discovered following the fire that Winata had submitted plans for renovating the market only a few months before the fire.

On 7 March, the magazine was threatened with libel charges by Winata's lawyers; the following day, a group of over 200 protesters appeared at the Tempo offices and allegedly threatened to burn the office down, gouge Taufik's eyes out, shouted racial insults, and assaulted Taufik when he went outside to speak with them.

Winata later filed a lawsuit, naming Taufik, his editor Iskandar Ali, and editor-in-chief Bambang Harymurti as defendants. The suit charged the three with libel, defamation, and refusing "to respect religious and moral norms". BBC News described the case as being "widely criticised as an attack on Indonesia's press". Amnesty International and the Committee to Protect Journalists both protested on behalf of the reporters, the former naming them potential prisoners of conscience. On 16 September 2004, Harymurti was found guilty of "defamation and false reporting" and sentenced to a year in prison, while Taufik and Ali were exonerated. The Central Jakarta Court's ruling that Tempo had to pay $55,000 USD in damages was overturned. On 9 February 2005, Harymutri's sentence was also overturned by the Supreme Court of Indonesia, a spokesperson for which stated, "We want to ensure that journalists are protected". Harymutri welcomed the decision as "not a personal victory but a victory for all Indonesian journalists".

== Personal life ==
Taufik was married to Syafai'liyin. He enjoyed painting and writing poetry, which he did while imprisoned. Taufik died on March 23, 2017, due to lung cancer.
