= Adinda Cresheilla =

Indonesian G20 Ambassador, actress, fashion model and Miss Supranational Indonesia 2022

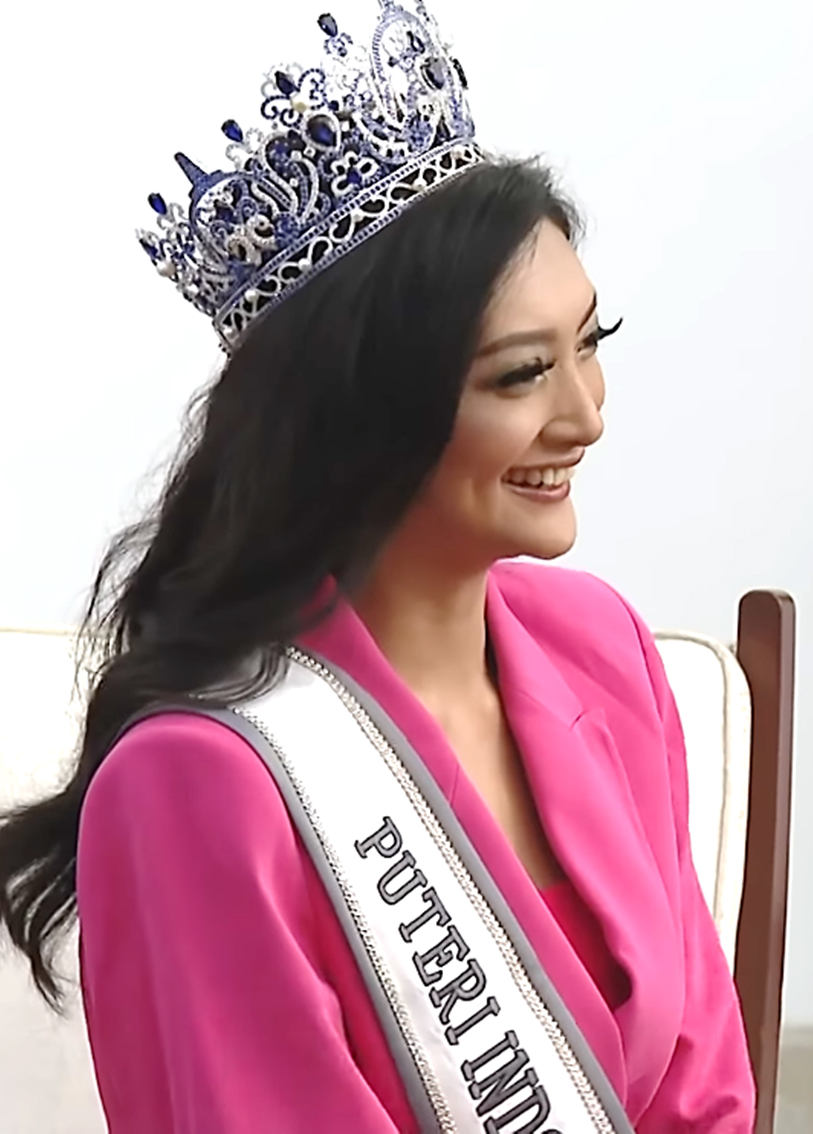
- Adinda as the G20 Ambassador in Merdeka Palace on 31 May 2022
- Born: 29 January 1997 (age 29); Surabaya, East Java, Indonesia
- Education: Deakin University (BA in Communication); University of Indonesia (BSS in Social Science)
- Beauty pageant titleholder
- Title: Puteri Indonesia Jawa Timur 2022; Puteri Indonesia Pariwisata 2022; Miss Supranational Indonesia 2022
- Hair color: Black
- Eye color: Brown
- Major competitions: Puteri Indonesia Jawa Timur 2022; (Winner); Puteri Indonesia 2022; (2nd Runner-up – Puteri Indonesia Pariwisata); Miss Supranational 2022; (3rd Runner-up)

Signature
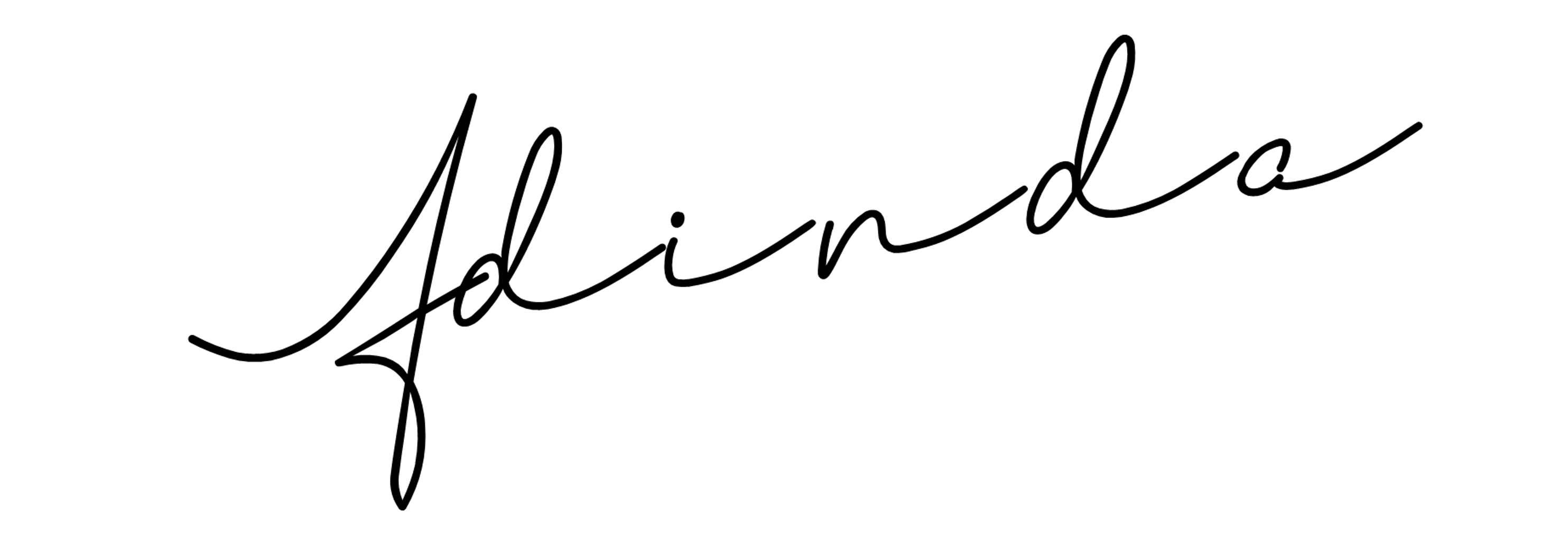

Adinda Cresheilla (born 29 January 1997) is an Indonesian model, actress, 2022 G20 Ambassador, and beauty pageant titleholder who was crowned Puteri Indonesia Pariwisata 2022. She is the first representative from East Java to be crowned Puteri Indonesia Pariwisata. She represented Indonesia at Miss Supranational 2022 in Poland where she placed as the 3rd runner-up.

== Early life and education ==
Adinda Cresheilla was born on 29 January 1997 in Surabaya, East Java, Indonesia to a Javanese- Minahasan mother, Emma Sugiyono, and a Javanese father, Dodock Credenda Handogo. Her father and older brother are Extreme E kart racers. She completed her double degree program of Bachelor of Social Science from University of Indonesia and received a full scholarship in Bachelor of Arts (BA) in Communication from Deakin University, Australia. She graduated with summa cum-laude and became a valedictorian.

== Career ==
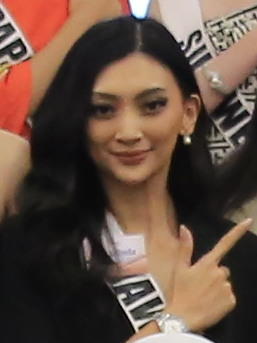
Cresheilla visiting the National Agency of Drug and Food Control on 25 May 2022

Cresheilla gained recognition as a model after being selected as a finalist for Wajah Femina and Gadis Sampul in 2016. Since then she appeared in Femina Magazine, Gadis Sampul, Cosmopolitan Indonesia, and Robb Report Singapore.

On 31 May 2022, together with Puteri Indonesia 2022 winners, Laksmi Shari De-Neefe Suardana and Cindy May McGuire, Cresheilla was appointed as the 2022 G20 Ambassador by the President of the Republic of Indonesia, Joko Widodo, at the Merdeka Palace, as part of the Indonesian presidency at the upcoming seventeenth meeting of the Group of Twenty (G20) in Bali.

== Pageantry ==
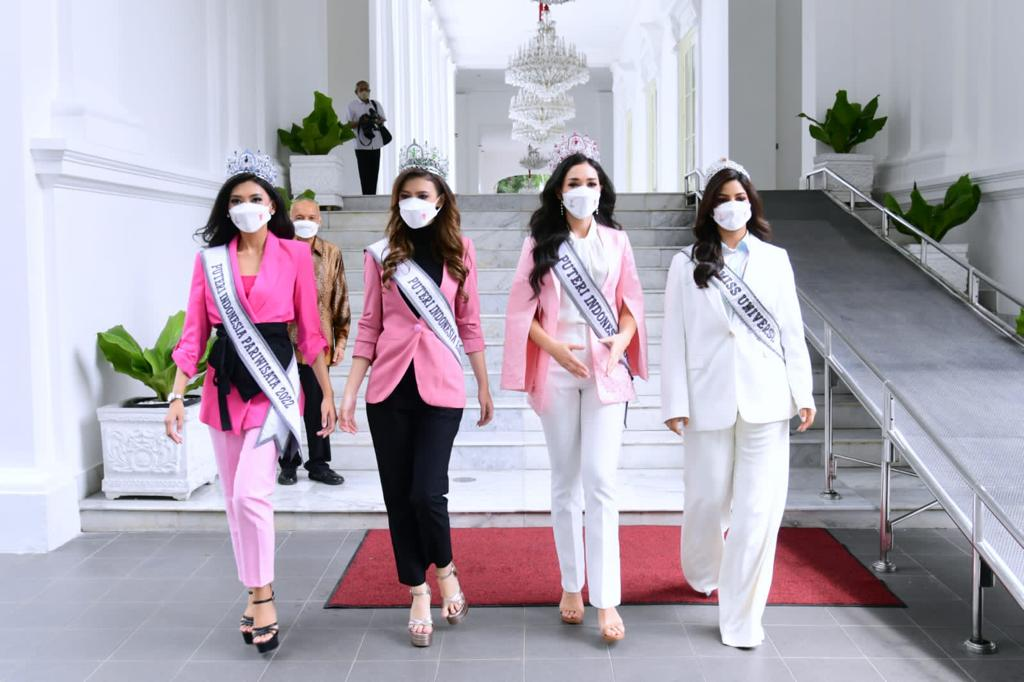
Cresheilla (left) together with Puteri Indonesia 2022 winners and Miss Universe 2021, Harnaaz Sandhu, visiting Merdeka Palace on 31 May 2022

=== Puteri Jawa Timur 2015 ===
Cresheilla joined the world of pageantry after she was recommended by Puteri Indonesia 2014, Elvira Devinamira Wirayanti, to join Puteri Jawa Timur 2015, but she failed to win the title.

=== Puteri Jawa Timur 2022 ===
After a seven year break, Cresheilla participated in Puteri Jawa Timur 2022, winning the title and right to represent Jawa Timur in the national pageant.

=== Puteri Indonesia 2022 ===
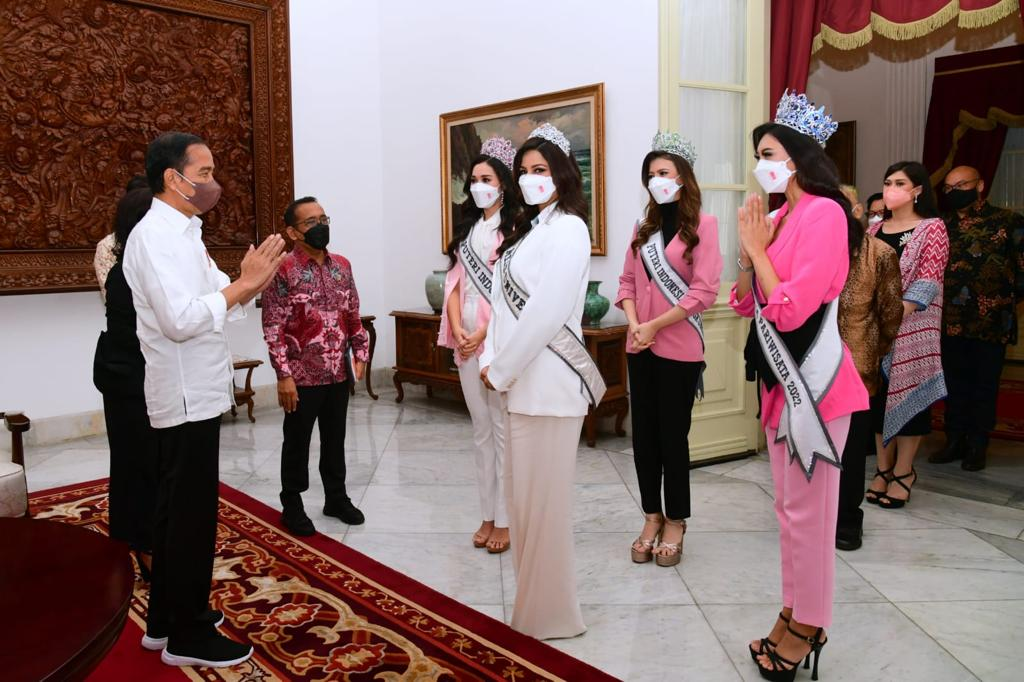
Cresheilla (right), together with Puteri Indonesia 2022 winners and Miss Universe 2021, Harnaaz Sandhu, received a warm welcome from the President of The Republic of Indonesia, Joko Widodo on 31 May 2022.

As the winner of Puteri Jawa Timur 2022, Cresheilla represented East Java at Puteri Indonesia 2022, at the Jakarta Convention Center, Jakarta, Indonesia, on 27 May 2022. She was selected as one of the top 10 in the "Personal Branding and Advocacy Challenge" and one of the three winners of "Miss Intelligence", where she received a master's degree scholarship from the IPMI International business school.

During the finale, Cresheilla was asked by Putri Kuswisnuwardhani whether she has any experiences that she would like to change. She answered:

I would not change any second in my life because that's what keeps me here. And that is what, the challenges, the obstacles, every [one] of those, it would give me every learning to get me standing in this stage tonight. And I am very grateful for each and every obstacles and challenges that I have been doing in my life and I am fully grateful for all of that and I won't change anything and I would do any better for the future. Thank you.

At the end of the event, Cresheilla was crowned as Puteri Indonesia Pariwisata 2022 by the outgoing titleholder, Jihane Almira Chedid of Central Java. Cresheilla was crowned along with her fellow Puteri Indonesia titleholders; Laksmi Shari De-Neefe Suardana and Cindy May McGuire.

=== Miss Supranational 2022 ===
As the winner of Puteri Indonesia Pariwisata 2022, Cresheilla represented Indonesia at Miss Supranational 2022 at the Strzelecki Park Amphitheater in Nowy Sącz, Małopolska, Poland on 15 July 2022.

During the pageant, Cresheilla won the special award of Miss Supra Chat, together with Nguyễn Huỳnh Kim Duyên of Vietnam. At the end of the event, Cresheilla was crowned as the 3rd runner-up. It was Indonesia's seventh consecutive placement and the fourth time in the top 5, after 2013, 2018, and 2019.

== Filmography ==
Cresheilla began her acting career in the comedy-romance film titled Jomblo, directed by Setiawan Hanung Bramantyo and produced by SinemArt in 2006. On her debut film, Cresheilla was paired with mega-stars Christian Sugiono, Rianti Cartwright and Nadia Saphira. In 2020, She also joined the Top Model competition, on Season 1 of Indonesia's Next Top Model, where she finished as a semi-finalist.

=== Cinema films ===
Year	Title	Role	Genre	Production	Ref.
2006	Jomblo	as Dini	comedy-romance	SinemArt	

=== Reality shows ===
Year	Title	Role	Genre	Production	Ref.
2020-2021	Indonesia's Next Top Model (season 1)	as semi-finalist	modelling-reality show	NET	

Awards and achievements
Preceded by (Venezuela) Valentina Sánchez	Miss Supranational; 3rd Runner-Up; 2022	Succeeded by (United Kingdom) Emma Rose Collingridge
Preceded by (Trinidad and Tobago) Jenelle Thongs (Venezuela) Valentina Sánchez	Miss Supranational; Supra Chat Winner (Vietnam) Nguyễn Huỳnh Kim Duyên; 2022	Succeeded by (Philippines) Pauline Amelinckx
Preceded by Ayu Maulida	Puteri East Java; 2022	Succeeded by Yasinta Aurellia
Preceded by Jihane Almira Chedid (Central Java)	Puteri Indonesia Pariwisata; 2022	Succeeded by Lulu Zaharani (Lampung)
Preceded by Jihane Almira Chedid (Central Java)	Miss Supranational Indonesia; 2022	Succeeded by Yasinta Aurellia (East Java)
