= Puteri Indonesia 2022 =

2022 Indonesian beauty pageant

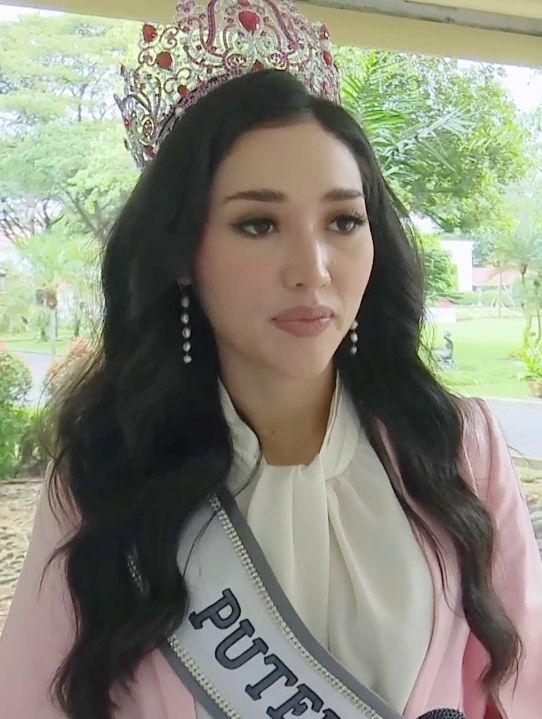
- Laksmi De-Neefe Suardana
- Date: 27 May 2022
- Presenters: Choky Sitohang; Patricia Gouw; Bubah Alfian; Anastasia Praditha
- Entertainment: Bunga Citra Lestari; Mawar Eva de Jongh; Vidi Aldiano
- Theme: Borobudur
- Venue: Jakarta Convention Center, Jakarta, Indonesia
- Broadcaster: SCTV
- Entrants: 44 (Note: Originally 45, Bali 2 withdraw for an unknown reason.)
- Placements: 11
- Winner: Laksmi De-Neefe Suardana; Bali
- Congeniality: Catherine Widya Putri Stumer, Central Java

Puteri Indonesia 2022, the 25th Puteri Indonesia pageant, was held on 27 May 2022 at Jakarta Convention Center in Jakarta, Indonesia. Puteri Indonesia 2020, Raden Roro Ayu Maulida Putri of East Java crowned her successor, Laksmi Shari De-Neefe Suardana of Bali at the end of the event. She represented Indonesia at Miss Universe 2022. Puteri Indonesia Lingkungan 2020, Putu Ayu Saraswati of Bali and Puteri Indonesia Pariwisata 2020, Jihane Almira Chedid of Central Java also crowned their successors, Cindy May McGuire of Jakarta SCR 5 and Adinda Cresheilla of East Java. Cresheilla represented the country at Miss Supranational 2022 where she placed 3rd runner-up, while McGuire competed at Miss International 2022 but unplaced.

The finale was attended by Miss Universe 2021, Harnaaz Sandhu of India, and Miss International 2019, Sireethorn Leearamwat of Thailand. Miss Supranational 2021, Chanique Rabe of Namibia was replaced by her first runner-up, Karla Guilfu of Puerto Rico, since she was not able to attend the show.

== Background ==
=== Location and date ===
Puteri Indonesia 2022 was originally scheduled to be held on 18 March 2022. However, on 17 February, Yayasan Puteri Indonesia postponed the show due to rising COVID-19 cases. It was finally held on 27 May at the Plenary Hall, Jakarta Convention Center, Jakarta.

=== Host and performers ===
Choky Sitohang and Patricia Gouw returned to host Puteri Indonesia 2022. This was Sitohang's eleventh and Gouw's second time to host the pageant; they previously hosted Puteri Indonesia 2020 together. Bubah Alfian and Anastasia Praditha served as the backstage hosts. Bunga Citra Lestari, Mawar Eva de Jongh, and Vidi Aldiano performed.

=== Selection of participants ===
10 contestants were chosen from the regional competition held in their respective provinces. 29 contestants were selected by judges through an audition held in Jakarta and six by audiences through public voting. On 9 May 2022, Jazmine Callista Rowe of Bali 2 withdrew before the pre-quarantine started for an unknown reason. In total, 44 contestants competed for the title. This edition also marked the first time that provinces other than Jakarta SCR had more than one representative.

== Results ==
=== Main ===
Puteri Indonesia 2022
Puteri Indonesia Lingkungan 2022
Puteri Indonesia Pariwisata 2022

Final results	Contestant	International results
Puteri Indonesia 2022 (Miss Universe Indonesia)	Bali – Laksmi Shari De-Neefe Suardana	Unplaced — Miss Universe 2022
Puteri Indonesia Lingkungan 2022 (Miss International Indonesia)	Jakarta SCR 5 – Cindy May McGuire	Unplaced — Miss International 2022
Puteri Indonesia Pariwisata 2022 (Miss Supranational Indonesia)	East Java – Adinda Cresheilla	3rd Runner-up — Miss Supranational 2022
Top 6	3rd Runner-up West Java – Melanie Theresia Berentz; 4th Runner-up Banten 1 – Chrissy Fransisca Olivyana Rugian; 5th Runner-up Southeast Sulawesi – Arina Rezkyana Arfa Δ	
Top 11	Jakarta SCR 3 – Nitya Paramita Suwandi §; South Sulawesi 2 – Dini Nurfitri Widjaya; Special Region of Yogyakarta – Erina Sofia Gudono; West Nusa Tenggara – Sheilla Intan Permatasari; West Sumatra – Erviera Syahnaz Maryam Lovienta	

Δ Voted into the top 6 by viewers
§ Voted into the top 11 by viewers

=== Special awards ===
Title	Contestant
Puteri Indonesia Persahabatan (Miss Congeniality)	Central Java – Catherine Widya Putri Stumer
Puteri Indonesia Favorit (Miss Favorite)	Jakarta SCR 3 – Nitya Paramita Suwandi
Puteri Indonesia Intelegensia (Miss Intelligence)	(gold) East Kalimantan – Magiana Ignasia Sinaga; (silver) East Java – Adinda Cresheilla; (bronze) South Kalimantan – Fransisca Octaviani Hardiputri
Puteri Indonesia Berbakat (Miss Talent)	(gold) Jakarta SCR 1 – Angelia Rizky; (silver) Jakarta SCR 5 – Cindy May McGuire; (bronze) North Sumatra – Sarah Pia Desideria Pandjaitan
Best Traditional Costume	(gold) Maluku – Jaswin Kaur Dhillon; (silver) Lampung 2 – Irene Garcia; (bronze) Papua 1 – Dina Ludia Marwa
Best Evening Gown	(gold) Banten 2 – Shinta Yuliasmi; (silver) West Nusa Tenggara – Sheilla Intan Permatasari; (bronze) Maluku – Jaswin Kaur Dhillon

== Pageant ==
=== Format ===
==== Puteri Indonesia Favorit Daerah ====
All thirty-four provinces had one favorite delegate decided from the highest public vote. The winner competed against other favorite delegates from their regions to be one of Puteri Indonesia 2022 contestants.

Province	Puteri Indonesia Favorit Daerah
Sumatra
Aceh	Cindy Bella Difia ∆
North Sumatra	Veren Ferita Kosasie
West Sumatra	Dhiyara Diah Srikandi
Riau	Naomy Angelica
Riau Islands	Salwa Rafila ∆
Jambi	Sindy Novela
South Sumatra	Rizki Ramadhani
Bangka Belitung	Maria Sefani
Bengkulu	Desvina Cleopatra Aija Alpima
Lampung	Irene Garcia §
Java
Jakarta SCR	Evita Febriyanti Taufan
Banten	Shinta Yuliasmi §
West Java	Anggi Rosdiani
Central Java	Friscla Aulia Zahwa Priyanto
SR Yogyakarta	Vania Zerlinda
East Java	Melati Tedja
Lesser Sunda Islands
Bali	Jazmine Callista Rowe §
West Nusa Tenggara	Elisabeth Ariani Delhaes
East Nusa Tenggara	Ayu Munandar Alam
Kalimantan
West Kalimantan	Wella Santana
South Kalimantan	Bianca Florian ∆
Central Kalimantan	Yasmin Deliana §
East Kalimantan	Dessy Paramita Dewi ∆
North Kalimantan	Imelda ∆
Sulawesi
South Sulawesi	Dini Nurfitri Widjaya §
West Sulawesi	Andi Aisamawar Hardy ∆
Southeast Sulawesi	Faizah Salsabila Kurniawan
Central Sulawesi	Widi Asih Utami
North Sulawesi	Gladys Claudia Kembuan
Gorontalo	Nor Farina
Eastern Indonesia
Maluku	Calista Sarah Desya Tutuarima ∆
North Maluku	Chichi Nurul Maryam
West Papua	Reny Yohana Lende Mere ∆
Papua	Elisabeth Yarinap Murib §

∆ Withdrew before voting started
§ Won the public vote

==== Puteri Indonesia Favorit Kepulauan ====
Instead of the previous 39, there will be 44 contestants competing for Puteri Indonesia 2022 title. Each regional group (Sumatra, Java, Lesser Sunda Islands, Kalimantan, Sulawesi, and Eastern Indonesia) had one extra representative decided from the highest public vote.

Region	Province	Puteri Indonesia Favorit Kepulauan
Sumatra	Lampung 2	Irene Garcia
Java	Banten 2	Shinta Yuliasmi
Lesser Sunda Islands	Bali 2	Jazmine Callista Rowe ∆
Kalimantan	Central Kalimantan 2	Yasmin Deliana
Sulawesi	South Sulawesi 2	Dini Nurfitri Widjaya
Eastern Indonesia	Papua 2	Elisabeth Yarinap Murib

∆ Withdrew before the pre-quarantine started

=== Pre-quarantine ===
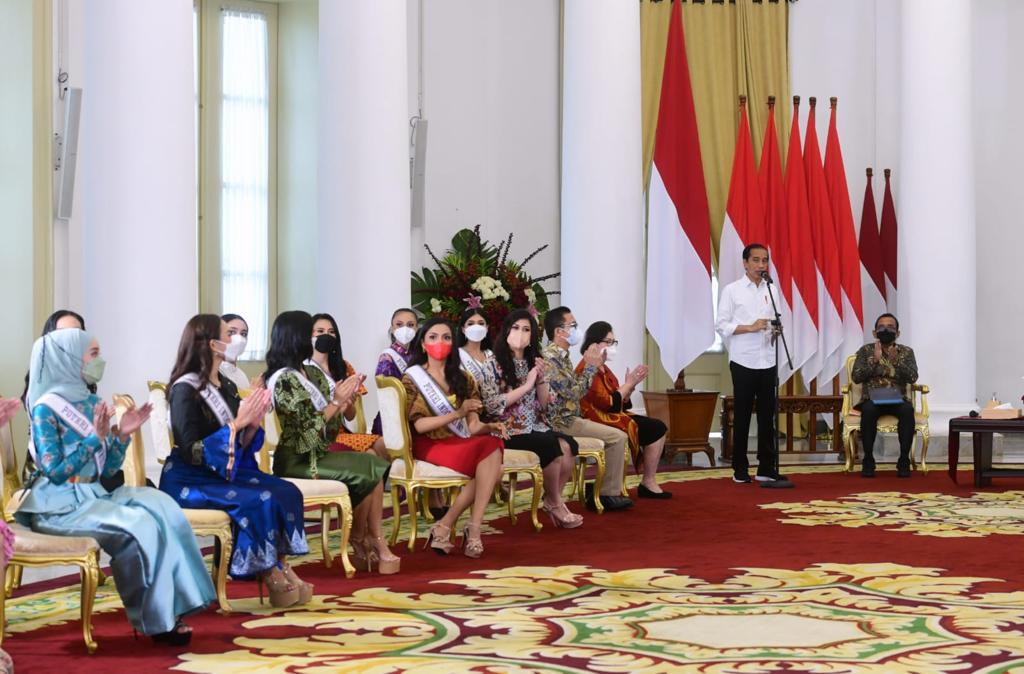
Puteri Indonesia 2022 finalists meet President Joko Widodo in Bogor Palace on 23 February 2022.

The pre-quarantine of Puteri Indonesia 2022 was held from 11 May to 17 May 2022. Many activities, such as contestant's introduction, sashing ceremony, makeup class, catwalk class, official photoshoot and videoshoot, choreography practice, and COVID-19 test, were done during this period of time.

=== Quarantine ===
Quarantine was held from 18 May to 26 May 2022. A new version of the Borobudur Crown was introduced during the press conference on the first day. Other activities, such as welcome dinner, Fashion Show Indonesia Berbasis Budaya (Indonesian Fashion Show With Culture; including evening gown, talent, and traditional costume competition), Jakarta Muslim Fashion Week, visit to the Corruption Eradication Commission and National Agency of Drug and Food Control's office, psychology test, deep interview, and rehearsal, were also carried out.

=== Selection committee ===
There were nine selection committee members.

- Kusuma Dewi Sutanto – Head of Organization of Puteri Indonesia
- Mega Angkasa – Head of Communications of Puteri Indonesia
- Kusuma Ida Anjani – Director of PT Mustika Ratu
- Frederika Alexis Cull – Puteri Indonesia 2019 from Jakarta SCR 1 and Top 10 Miss Universe 2019
- Sireethorn Leearamwat – Miss International 2019 from Thailand
- Anya Geraldine – Actress
- Puan Maharani – Speaker of People's Representative Council
- Triawan Munaf– Chairman of Garuda Indonesia
- Budi Gunadi Sadikin – Minister of Health of Indonesia

== Challenge events ==
=== Catwalk Challenge ===
In this challenge, 45 contestants had to show off their catwalk skills through a short video.

Placement	Contestant
Winner	East Nusa Tenggara – Breldy Angela Lerrick
1st runner-up	Banten 1 – Chrissy Fransisca Olivyana Rugian
2nd runner-up	Bali 1 – Laksmi Shari De-Neefe Suardana (Note: Since she is the only Balinese representative after the withdrawal of Bali 2, her sash was changed from Bali 1 to Bali during the pre-quarantine.)
Top 6	Aceh – Eggy Fegri Lindira Putri; East Kalimantan – Magiana Ignasia Sinaga; Southeast Sulawesi – Arina Rezkyana Arfa

=== #AskForHer Challenge ===
In this challenge, 45 contestants were divided into nine groups and they had to answer some questions given by Yayasan Puteri Indonesia. The winner from each group competed again in the semifinal round, before went head-to-head in the grand final round.

==== Preliminary round ====
Advanced to the semifinal round

Group	Province 1	Province 2	Province 3	Province 4	Province 5
1	North Sumatra	Lampung 1	Banten 2	South Kalimantan	Central Sulawesi
2	Aceh	Lampung 2	West Java	Central Kalimantan 1	North Sulawesi
3	West Sumatra	Jakarta SCR 1	Central Java	Central Kalimantan 2	Gorontalo
4	Riau	Jakarta SCR 2	East Java	East Kalimantan	Maluku
5	Riau Islands	Jakarta SCR 3	West Nusa Tenggara	West Kalimantan	North Maluku
6	Jambi	Jakarta SCR 4	SR Yogyakarta	South Sulawesi 1	West Papua
7	South Sumatra	Jakarta SCR 5	Bali 1	South Sulawesi 2	Papua 1
8	Bangka Belitung	Jakarta SCR 6	Bali 2	West Sulawesi	Papua 2
9	Bengkulu	Banten 1	East Nusa Tenggara	North Kalimantan	Southeast Sulawesi

==== Semifinal round ====
Advanced to the grand final round

Group	Province 1	Province 2	Province 3
1	Jakarta SCR 2	Banten 2	Bali 1
2	Bangka Belitung	West Kalimantan	North Sulawesi
3	West Sumatra	Jambi	Banten 1

==== Grand final round ====
Final result	Contestant
Winner	Jambi – Bela Puspita Dalimi
1st runner-up	North Sulawesi – Keisy Elfrani Mawey
2nd runner-up	Jakarta SCR 2 – Saira Milenia Saima Rao

=== Personal Branding and Advocacy Challenge ===
In this challenge, 45 contestants had to introduce themselves and promote their advocacy through a short video. The winners were invited to be speakers in EdHeroes Australia Forum 2022 on 30 April 2022.

Final result	Contestant
Winners	Banten 1 – Chrissy Fransisca Olivyana Rugian; East Kalimantan – Magiana Ignasia Sinaga; SR Yogyakarta – Erina Sofia Gudono
Top 10	Bali 1 – Laksmi Shari De-Neefe Suardana; East Java – Adinda Cresheilla; East Nusa Tenggara – Breldy Angela Lerrick; Jakarta SCR 1 – Angelia Rizky; North Sumatra – Sarah Pia Desideria Pandjaitan; South Sulawesi 1 – Adila Amalia Irvan; West Sumatra – Erviera Syahnaz Maryam Lovienta

=== Motion Challenge ===
In this challenge, contestants were given a motion and they had to state whether they agree or not and elaborate it with their thoughts in 105 seconds. No winner was announced.

Group	Province 1	Province 2	Province 3	Province 4
1	Jakarta SCR 2	North Maluku	Southeast Sulawesi	North Sumatra
2	Jambi	Central Kalimantan 2	South Sulawesi 2	Jakarta SCR 4
3	Bangka Belitung	West Sulawesi (Note: She replaced Defanda Azzahra, the original candidate who withdrew due to health reason.)	West Nusa Tenggara	Jakarta SCR 1
4	Central Java	Jakarta SCR 6	Bengkulu	North Sulawesi
5	South Kalimantan	East Java	South Sumatra	Riau
6	Bali	Aceh	Jakarta SCR 3	Maluku
7	Jakarta SCR 5	Lampung 1	SR Yogyakarta	Riau Islands
8	Banten 1	North Kalimantan	Lampung 2	West Java
9	Banten 2	Papua 2	West Papua	Gorontalo
10	Central Sulawesi	Central Kalimantan 1	West Kalimantan	East Nusa Tenggara
11	West Sumatra	Papua 1	South Sulawesi 1	East Kalimantan

== Contestants ==
Forty-four contestants competed for the title.

Province	Contestant	Age (Note: Ages at the time of the pageant.)	Hometown
Sumatra
Aceh	Eggy Fegri Lindira Putri	24	Langsa
North Sumatra	Sarah Pia Desideria Pandjaitan	25	Medan
West Sumatra	Erviera Syahnaz Maryam Lovienta	23	Solok
Riau	Annisya Putri Soraya	19	Pekanbaru
Riau Islands	Charmelita Dhita Oktivia	23	Batam
Jambi	Bela Puspita Dalimi	24	Jambi
South Sumatra	Extika Florenza	20	Pagar Alam
Bangka Belitung	Sabrina Daniel	25	Bangka
Bengkulu	Syafaniar Virgyen	20	Kaur
Lampung 1	Feby Annisa	23	Tulang Bawang
Lampung 2	Irene Garcia	22	Bandar Lampung
Jakarta SCR
Jakarta SCR 1	Angelia Rizky	23	Jakarta
Jakarta SCR 2	Saira Milenia Saima Rao	25	Jakarta
Jakarta SCR 3	Nitya Paramita Suwandi	25	Jakarta
Jakarta SCR 4	Nurkhotimah Panay	25	Jakarta
Jakarta SCR 5	Cindy May McGuire	25	Jakarta
Jakarta SCR 6	Maureethania Miranda	25	Jakarta
Java
Banten 1	Chrissy Fransisca Olivyana Rugian	24	South Tangerang
Banten 2	Shinta Yuliasmi	26	Serang
West Java	Melanie Theresia Berentz	22	Bandung
Central Java	Catherine Widya Putri Stumer	18	Cilacap
SR Yogyakarta	Erina Sofia Gudono	25	Sleman
East Java	Adinda Cresheilla	25	Surabaya
Lesser Sunda Islands
Bali	Laksmi Shari De-Neefe Suardana	26	Ubud
West Nusa Tenggara	Sheilla Intan Permatasari	21	Central Lombok
East Nusa Tenggara	Breldy Angela Lerrick	19	Sabu Raijua
Kalimantan
West Kalimantan	Arisda Oktalia	24	Pontianak
South Kalimantan	Fransisca Octaviani Hardiputri	26	Banjarmasin
Central Kalimantan 1	Stella Bella Elizabeth Maukar	24	Pangkalan Bun
Central Kalimantan 2	Yasmin Deliana	22	Kapuas
East Kalimantan	Magiana Ignasia Sinaga	24	Samarinda
North Kalimantan	Astrid Nicolien Poluan	26	Tanjung Selor
Sulawesi
South Sulawesi 1	Adila Amalia Irvan	24	Palopo
South Sulawesi 2	Dini Nurfitri Widjaya	25	East Luwu
West Sulawesi	Maycela Apriany	19	Polewali Mandar
Southeast Sulawesi	Arina Rezkyana Arfa	22	Kolaka
Central Sulawesi	Abigail Pingkan Sanders Kiolol	25	Palu
North Sulawesi	Keisy Elfrani Mawey	24	Manado
Gorontalo	Rafa Mutiara Putri	20	Boalemo
Eastern Indonesia
Maluku	Jaswin Kaur Dhillon	23	Ambon
North Maluku	Gusti Chairunnysa Kusumayuda	20	North Halmahera
West Papua	Kezia Mirella Yung Syaranamual	20	Sorong
Papua 1	Dina Ludia Marwa	25	Sarmi
Papua 2	Elisabeth Yarinap Murib	21	Nabire
