= Ubud Writers & Readers Festival =

Indonesian literary festival

Ubud Writers & Readers Festival (UWRF)
- Genre: Literary festival
- Locations: Ubud, Bali, Indonesia
- Years active: 2004–present
- Previous event: 29 October – 2 November 2025
- Next event: 21 – 25 October 2026
- Website: www.ubudwritersfestival.com

Ubud Writers & Readers Festival (UWRF) is an annual four-day literary festival held every October in Ubud on the island of Bali, Indonesia. Established in 2004, it is considered Southeast Asia’s biggest and most meaningful literary Festival. It hosts up to 170 writers and artists from all corners of the world. Discussions on cultural, literary and political issues are held alongside book launches, film premieres, long-table lunches, workshops, readings, live music, village walks and performances. It is organised by the not-for-profit foundation Yayasan Mudra Swari Saraswati.

== History ==
The Ubud Writers & Readers Festival was conceived by Melbourne-born Janet DeNeefe as a healing project in response to the 2002 Bali bombings. It was first held in 2004 as part of an effort to help revive tourism, the island’s main economic lifeline after terrorist bombings devastated the Kuta district a year earlier. What began as a small gathering of writers and readers in the heart of Ubud has since grown into one of the world’s most celebrated literary festivals, drawing up to 170 writers, thinkers, artists, and performers from across the globe each October. Held across multiple venues in Ubud, Bali, the Festival is widely regarded as Southeast Asia’s premier literary event, offering a programme of panel discussions, book launches, workshops, long-table lunches, village walks, and live performances.

Since 2019, the Festival’s Perth Edition, presented in partnership with Writing WA, has provided an annual forum to exchange views with writers and creators from both countries on a wide range of topics. After two years in virtual form in 2020 and 2021, the Perth Edition was held in person again in the Rechabite Hall in the Australian city of Perth, Western Australia between 21–23 October 2022.

== Description ==
The Festival is known as the biggest Festival of words and ideas in Southeast Asia, in which many celebrated writers, artists, thinkers, and performers participate. In 2019 the Festival was named one of the top five literary festivals in the world by The Daily Telegraph in the UK, and in 2022, it was chosen as one of the prime cultural festivals in autumn by The Wall Street Journal. In 2023, it was named South-East Asia’s most significant literary event by the Australian weekly newspaper, The Saturday Paper. In 2024, it was named one of the best literary festivals to visit around the world by Dua Lipa's lifestyle platform Service 95.

== Chronology ==
- 2015: The 12th edition of UWRF was held in 2015 in 38 venues across Bali, in which more than 200 writers from all over the world took part. A controversy was raised over the proposed discussion about Indonesia's anti-communist purges that killed an estimated 500,000 people in 1965.
- 2016: The 13th edition of UWRF was held in 2016, attended by 160 of the world’s leading authors, artists and performers.
- 2017: The 2017 UWRF was the 14th edition of the festival, which was held from 25 October to 29 October participated by more than 150 authors, artists and activists from 31 countries.
- 2018: The 15th edition of UWRF was held from 24 October to 28 October 2018, focusing on gender equality and diversity.
- 2019: The theme of the 16th edition, held from 23 October to 27 October 2019, was Karma. 180 speakers from 30 countries participated in the Festival. There were more than 170 programs, including panel discussions of various issues, film screenings, art exhibitions, book launches and writing workshops.
- 2020: The 2020 Festival, which was planned to be held from 29 October to 8 November 2020, was postponed because of the COVID-19 pandemic. The theme was proposed to be called Kembali.
- 2021: In 2021, the inaugural Ubud Writers & Readers Festival Perth (UWRF Perth) is scheduled to be held on 8–10 October in Perth, Western Australia, organised in partnership with Writing WA and overlapping with the Bali event, which is scheduled to run from 8–17 October.
- 2022: After two years of being held online and hybrid, the 19th edition of the Festival was held again fully in person from 27 October to 30 October 2022 with more than 150 writers and thinkers. The Festival’s theme Memayu Hayuning Bawana centred around humanity’s capacity to strengthen the ties between individuals and our world.
- 2023: The 2023 Festival marked the 20th Anniversary Celebration of the Festival, taking place from 18 to 22 October 2023, and explored the theme Atita, Wartamana, Anagata: Past, Present, Future. It featured over two hundred speakers and an equal number of programs, attracting more than 15,000 festival-goers, making it one of the most successful editions to date.
- 2024 saw the Festival take place between 23 and 27 October, exploring the theme 'Satyam Vada Dharmam Chara: Speak the Truth, Practice Kindness.' The program delved into how words and ideas shape public discourse, influence societal norms, and how writers can amplify the values of truth and kindness in a world that is increasingly going the other way.
- 2025 will mark the 22nd year of the festival, scheduled for 29 October to 2 November, exploring the theme Aham Brahmasmi – I Am the Universe. A Sanskrit concept from ancient Hindu wisdom, originating from the Brihadaranyaka Upanishad, it signifies the unity of the human self with the universe or the highest cosmic power and acknowledges that each individual holds the same creative potential as the universe itself.
- 2026 will mark the 23rd year of the Festival, scheduled for 21 to 25 October 2026, exploring the theme Samarasā: Awareness. Empathy. Action. The four-day programme draws from Sanskrit philosophy, focusing on harmony between Citta (mind), Rasa (heart), and Karsa (action), and invites reflection on how thought, feeling, and action can exist in balance.

== See also ==
- MUD Literary Club
- Laksmi De-Neefe Suardana
