= Voices of Youth =

Voices of Youth is an organization set up by UNICEF to help children from across the world exchange knowledge and ideas. Voices of Youth was founded in 1995, as a way to relay messages from children in 81 countries to world leaders at the World Summit for Social Development. The mission statement of Voices of Youth is "To offer all children and adolescents, including the hard-to-reach, a safe and supportive global cyberspace within which they can explore, discuss and partner on issues related to human rights and social change, as well as develop their awareness, leadership, community building, and critical thinking skills through active and substantive participation with their peers and with decision makers globally."

== History ==
In 1997, the official Voices of Youth discussion boards (referred to as the "Meeting Place") were set up to allow young people to discuss child rights and development issues. To ensure that a wide range of people could participate, parallel forums were set up in English, French, and Spanish. At the same time, a "Learning Place" was established to give youths accurate and accessible information about child rights through quizzes, games and photo journals. A "Teacher’s Place" was also established as a forum to help teachers and other young leaders exchange ideas and find ways to use Voices of Youth as a learning tool.

In 2002, Voices of Youth was completely reorganized. After discussing possible changes with site users across the world, the administrators reorganized the website into three sections: "Explore", "Speak Out", and "Take Action". In addition to the website, Voices of Youth also publishes a bi-monthly newsletter, "What Young People Are Saying".

In 2005, Voices of Youth added an Arabic mirror site to involve young Arabic speakers from around the world in the discussions about rights.

In 2006, Voices of Youth launched the first ever webgame in Swahili about HIV and AIDS.

== Sections ==
Explore

This section provides links to factual information about child rights and development issues. It also includes stories written by and about young people from around the world, as well as games, quizzes, and videos to provide information in an interesting and accessible way.

Speak Out

This section is based around the Voices of Youth discussion boards. To make the forums more accessible to new users, summaries of popular discussions are posted. Stories and poems submitted by Voices of Youth members are also posted in this section.

Take Action

This section suggests community projects that young people can begin to help improve the world. This section also profiles successful youth leaders as sources of inspiration, and provides a list of organizations and projects for users to get involved in.

== Users ==
Voices of Youth members are from more than 180 countries. More than 60% are from developing countries.

55% of Voices of Youth forum users are female, while only 40% are male (5% of members did not disclose their gender).

32% of Voices of Youth members are 15- to 19-year-olds, and an additional 32% are 20- to 25-year-olds. 8% of users are aged 10–14.

== See also ==
- UNICEF
