= UPN (disambiguation) =

UPN was an American broadcast television network from 1995 to 2006.

UPN may also refer to:

== Education ==
- National Pedagogic University (Mexico) (Spanish: Universidad Pedagógica Nacional), Mexico City, Mexico
- Private University of the North (Spanish: Universidad Privada del Norte), Trujillo, Peru
- Universities of National Development "Veteran", Indonesia
  - University of National Development "Veteran" East Java, Surabaya
  - University of National Development "Veteran" Jakarta, Jakarta
  - University of National Development "Veteran" Yogyakarta, Sleman

== Politics ==
- Navarrese People's Union (Spanish: Unión del Pueblo Navarro), a political party in Spain
- Nigerien Progressive Union (French: Union progressiste nigérienne), a former political party in Niger
- Unity Party of Nigeria, a now-defunct political party from the Nigerian Second Republic

== Other uses ==
- Unique Pupil Number, held in the National Pupil Database in the U.K.
- Universal Product Number, a subset of the UPC barcode used for medical products
- Universal Principal Name, an object in Subject Alternative Name extension in X.509 certificate
- UPN (notation) or Reverse Polish notation, a mathematical notation in which operators follow their operands
- Upn, the symbol for the chemical element unpentnilium
- UPN, the abbreviation for the Union Pacific North Line, a Metra line in the Chicago metropolitan area
- Uruapan International Airport (IATA: UPN), Uruapan, Michoacán, Mexico
- Ústav pamäti národa, National Memory Institute of Slovakia
- User Principal Name, a Windows Active Directory username in an email address format
