= Yasinta Aurellia =

Indonesian beauty pageant titleholder

- ꦪꦱꦶꦤ꧀ꦠꦄꦲꦸꦫꦺꦭ꧀ꦭꦶꦪ
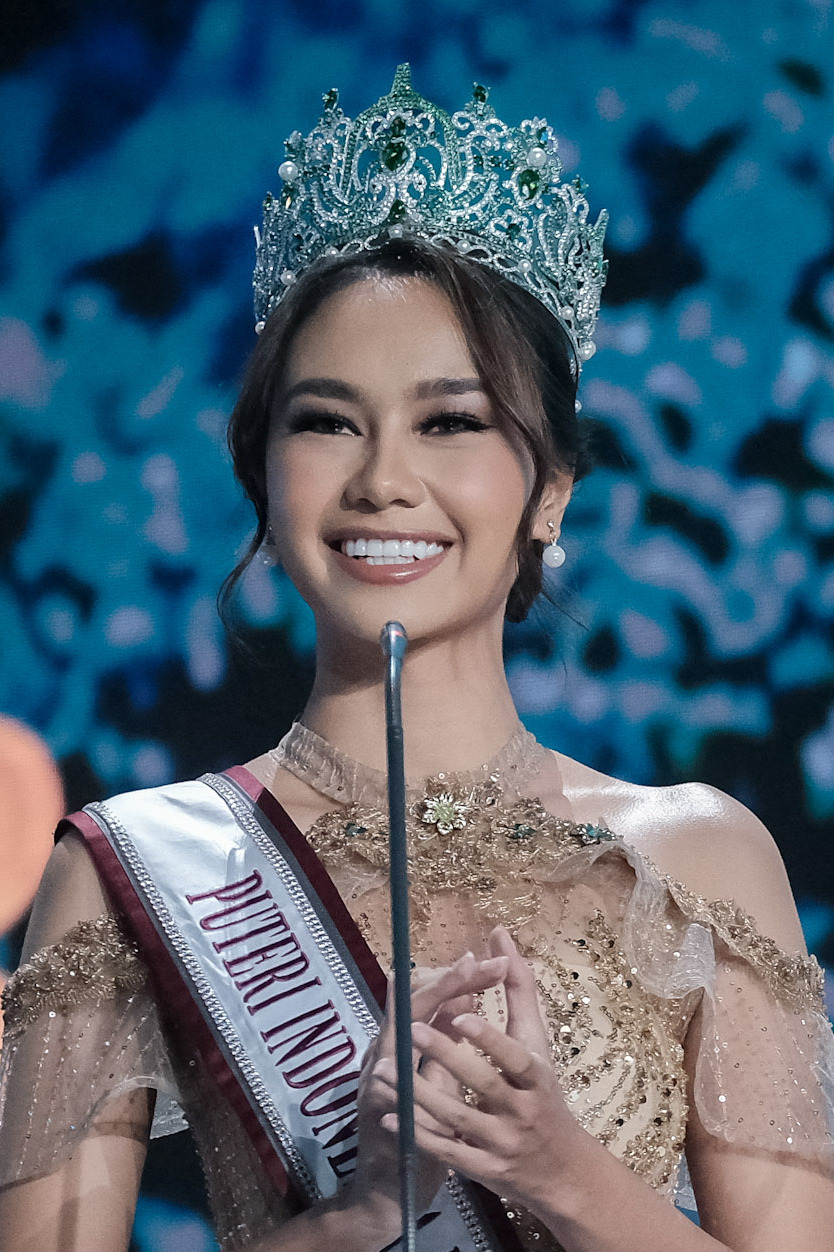
- Yasinta in August 2023
- Born: Yasinta Aurellia; October 2, 2003 (age 23); Sidoarjo, East Java, Indonesia
- Education: National Development University "Veteran" of East Java (Communication Science)
- Height: 1.73 m (5 ft 8 in)
- Beauty pageant titleholder
- Title: Puteri Indonesia Jawa Timur 2023; Puteri Indonesia Lingkungan 2023; Miss Supranational Indonesia 2023
- Major competitions: Puteri Indonesia Jawa Timur 2023; (Winner); Puteri Indonesia 2023; (1st Runner-up – Puteri Indonesia Lingkungan 2023); Miss Supranational 2023; (Top 24)

Yasinta Aurellia (Javanese: ꦪꦱꦶꦤ꧀ꦠꦄꦲꦸꦫꦺꦭ꧀ꦭꦶꦪ; born October 2, 2003) is a model and Indonesia beauty pageant titleholder who was crowned as Puteri Indonesia Lingkungan 2023. She represented Indonesia at Miss Supranational 2023 beauty pageant in Małopolska, Poland and she was placed in the top 24 semifinalists.

== Early life and education ==
Yasinta Aurellia was born in Sidoarjo, East Java, Indonesia to Javanese parents. She has studied communication science at National Development University "Veteran" of East Java (UPN Veteran Jawa Timur) in Surabaya, East Java.

== Pageantry ==
=== Puteri Indonesia Jawa Timur 2023 ===
Yasinta competed in the provincial pageant and won the title Puteri Indonesia Jawa Timur 2023 on February 11, 2023. As Puteri Indonesia Jawa Timur 2023, Yasinta represented her province at Puteri Indonesia 2023 national pageant.

=== Puteri Indonesia 2023 ===
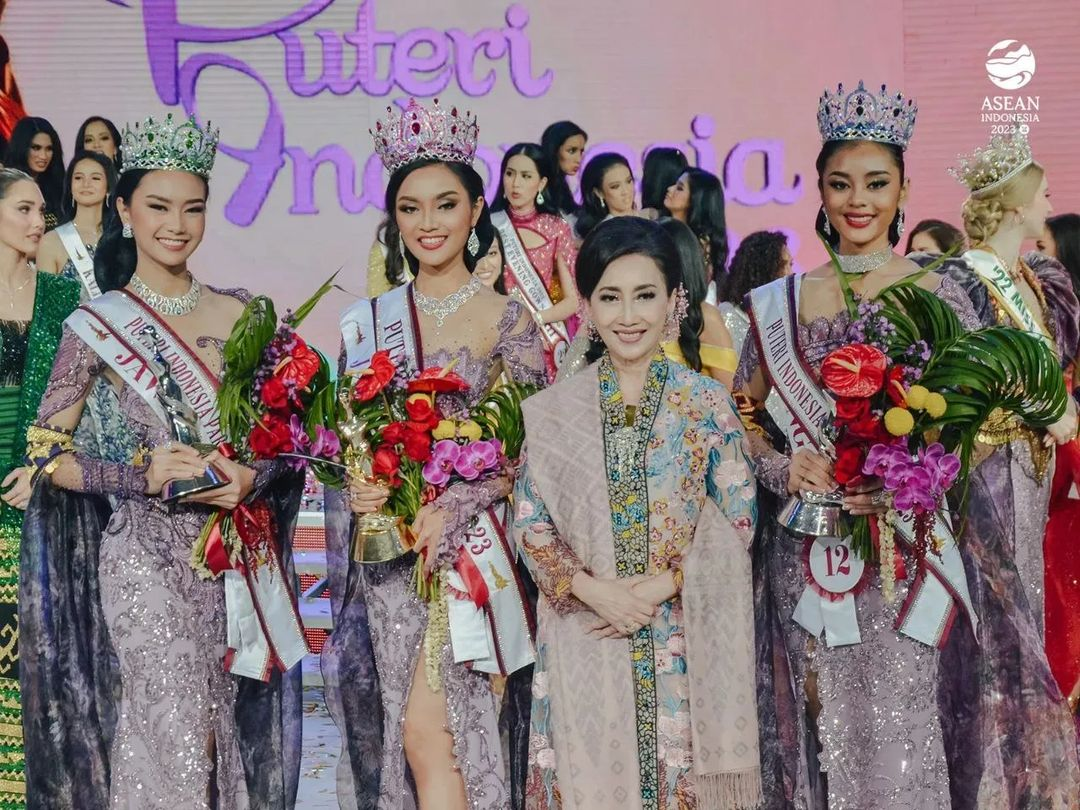
Yasinta (left) crowned as Puteri Indonesia Lingkungan 2023

Yasinta represented Jawa Timur at Puteri Indonesia 2023 held at the Jakarta Convention Center, Jakarta, Indonesia, on 19 May 2023. In the preliminary competition, she got a nomination for Best Traditional Costime and got the Sanjani Award by Oppal (sponsor).

During the finale, Yasinta was asked by Putri Kuswisnuwardhani the perception between doing something good and doing something right. She answered:

Menurut saya, berbuat baik dan berbuat benar adalah hal yang berbeda. Karena berbuat benar belum tentu baik dan berbuat baik sudah pasti benar dan dilandasi oleh hati nurani dan adab. Karena saya percaya, bahwa adab berada di atas ilmu. Terima kasih. (In my opinion, doing good and doing right are different things. Because doing right is not always good, but doing good is always right and it is based on conscience and manner. Because I believe, manner before knowledge. Thank you.).

At the end of the coronation night, Yasinta was placed as 1st Runner-up and got the Puteri Indonesia Lingkungan 2023 title, being the second East Java representative to be Puteri Indonesia Lingkungan after Liza Elly Purnamasari in 2011. She was crowned as Puteri Indonesia Lingkungan 2023 by the outgoing titleholder, Cindy May McGuire of Jakarta SCR 5. Farhana Nariswari Wisandana was crowned as Puteri Indonesia 2023.

=== Miss Supranational 2023 ===
As Puteri Indonesia Lingkungan 2023, Yasinta represented Indonesia at Miss Supranational 2023 in Poland, on July 14, 2023, when she placed as one of Top 24 semifinalists.

== See also ==
- Puteri Indonesia 2023
- Miss Supranational 2023
- Farhana Nariswari
- Lulu Zaharani

Awards and achievements
Preceded by Adinda Cresheilla	Puteri East Java; 2023	Succeeded by Melati Tedja
Preceded by Cindy May McGuire (Jakarta)	Puteri Indonesia Lingkungan; 2023	Succeeded by Sophie Kirana (Yogyakarta SR)
Preceded by Adinda Cresheilla (East Java)	Miss Supranational Indonesia; 2023	Succeeded by Harashta Haifa Zahra (West Java)
