= Farhana Nariswari =

Indonesian beauty pageant titleholder

- ᮖᮁᮠᮔ ᮔᮛᮤᮞ᮪ᮝᮛᮤ ᮝᮤᮞᮔ᮪ᮓᮔ
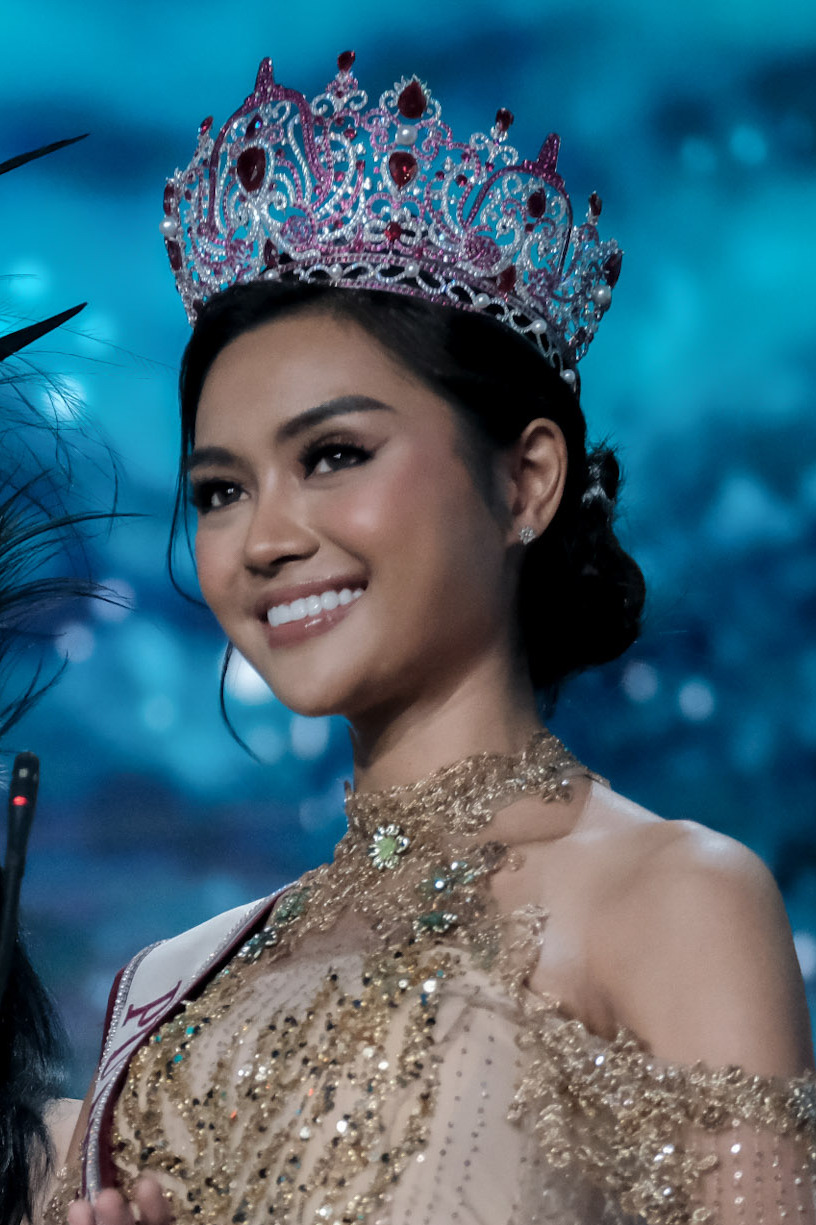
- Nariswari in August 2023
- Born: Farhana Nariswari Wisandana; 28 May 1996 (age 30); Bandung, West Java, Indonesia
- Education: Padjadjaran University (Medical Studies)
- Beauty pageant titleholder
- Title: Puteri Indonesia 2023; Miss International Indonesia 2023
- Hair color: Black
- Eye color: Dark brown
- Major competitions: Puteri Indonesia Jawa Barat 2022; (1st Runner-up); Puteri Indonesia 2023; (Winner); Miss International 2023; (Unplaced)

Farhana Nariswari Wisandana (Note: Indonesian pronunciation: [farˈha.na ˌna.riˈswa.ri ˌwi.sanˈda.na]) (Sundanese: ᮖᮁᮠᮔ ᮔᮛᮤᮞ᮪ᮝᮛᮤ ᮝᮤᮞᮔ᮪ᮓᮔ; born 28 May 1996) is an Indonesian model and beauty pageant titleholder who was crowned as Puteri Indonesia 2023. She represented Indonesia at Miss International 2023 in Tokyo, Japan.

== Early life and education ==
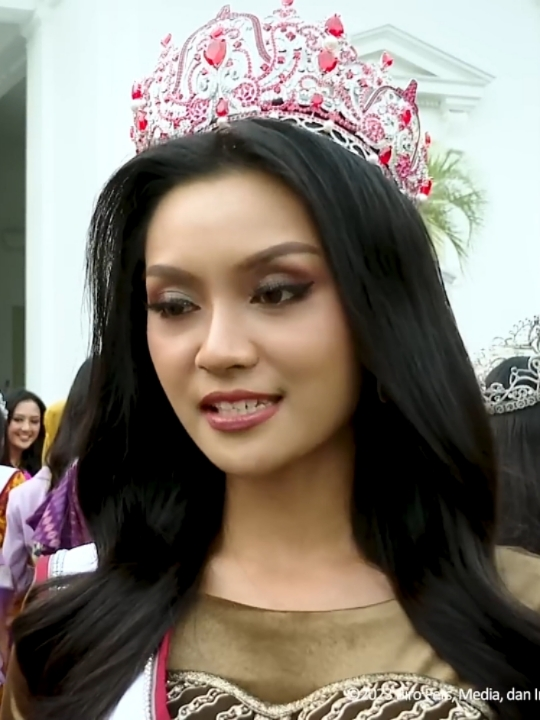
Nariswari has an audience with President Joko Widodo after her victory as Puteri Indonesia 2023 at the Merdeka Palace, 22 May 2023

Farhana Nariswari Wisandana was born on 28 May 1996 in the city of Bandung in West Java, Indonesia. Nariswari is the eldest daughter of two children from her father Wisandana Sanudi, a former West Java provincial government employee of Sundanese descent and a mother of Minangkabau descent from Solok City, West Sumatra. Her sister, Rabita Madina from the Gadjah Mada University, was the winner of the Student Achievement Election (PILMAPRES) in 2020.

Growing up in the city of Bandung, Nariswari completed her high school education from Taruna Bakti High School in 2013. After graduating, she took part in the AFS Italy Exchange Program from Liceo Scientifico D'Alessandro located in the Metropolitan City of Palermo in the Sicily region, Italy for one year (2013—2014). In 2020, Nariswari completed her undergraduate education by earning a Bachelor of Medicine (S.Ked.) at the Faculty of Medicine from Padjadjaran University in city of Bandung, West Java.

== Career ==
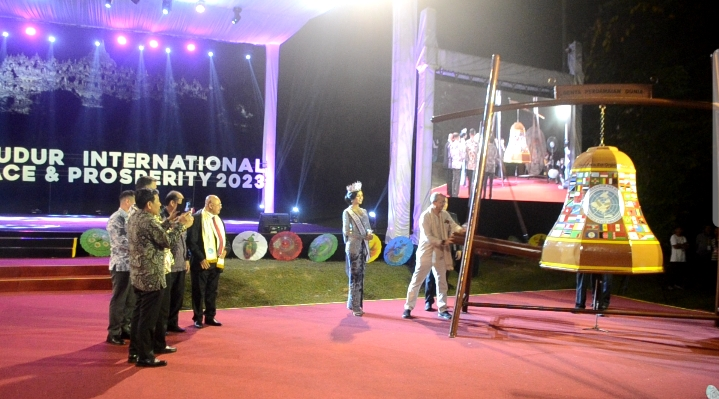
Nariswari (center) at the 2nd Borobudur International World Peace and Prosperity Event at Borobudur Temple, 2 June 2023

In 2018, Nariswari took part in the Asian Medical Students Association (AMSA) Indonesia National Debate Championship competition, where in this competition she managed to win an award in the Top 5 for Best Speaker. In the same year, she was selected as a Clinical Internship in the Neurology Department of the Sapienza University of Rome in Rome, Italy. One year later, Nariswari was elected as one of the delegates to the International Federation of Medical Students' Associations (IFMSA) at the United Nations Commission on Population and Development in New York City, United States.

In June 2023, Nariswari attended and was entrusted with delivering the World Peace and Prosperity prologue at the 2nd Borobudur International World Peace and Prosperity Event which was held at Aksobhya Park which is part of the Borobudur Temple in Magelang Regency, Central Java. The event was held with the aim of promoting world peace and global prosperity through dialogue, cooperation and understanding between countries around the world as part of the 2023 Vesak Day celebrations in Indonesia.

In June 2023, Nariswari returned to the United States to be a participant in the Global Health Systems Summer Institute of the Johns Hopkins Bloomberg School of Public Health, Johns Hopkins University in Baltimore, Maryland.

== Pageantry ==
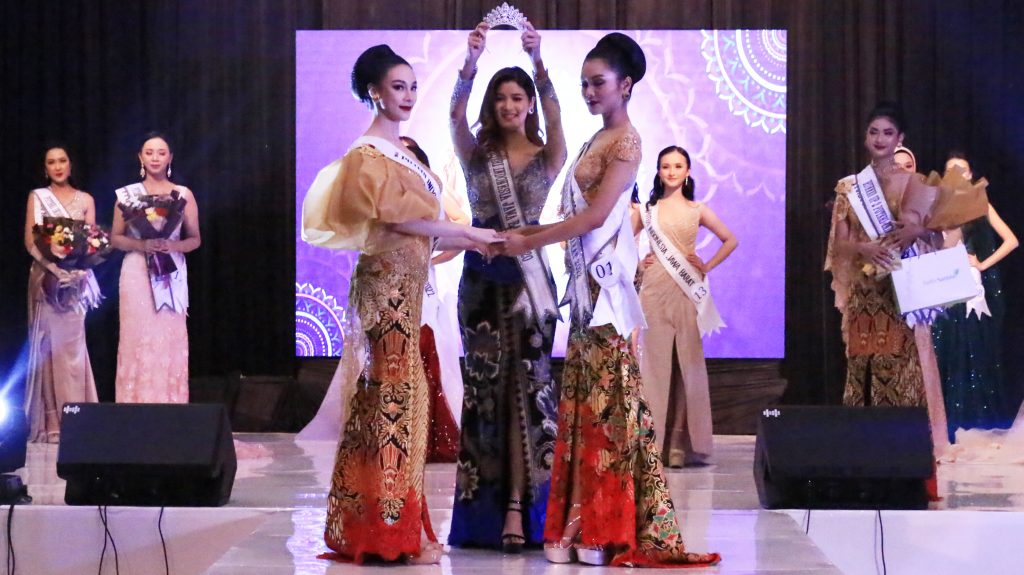
Nariswari (front right) before being crowned 1st Runner-up for Puteri Indonesia West Java 2022 before the contest was won by Melanie Berentz

=== Puteri Indonesia Jawa Barat 2022 ===
In 2022, Nariswari competed at Puteri Indonesia Jawa Barat regional pageants and got the title 1st Runner-up.

=== Puteri Indonesia Jawa Barat 1 2023 ===
In 2023, Nariswari joined the national audition to get the title of Puteri Indonesia Jawa Barat 2023 at Jakarta, when finally she was selected as Puteri Indonesia Jawa Barat 1 2023 and represented her province at Puteri Indonesia 2023. Her fellow contestant Salma Maulina Wijaya won the public vote and got the sash Puteri Indonesia Jawa Barat 2 2023.

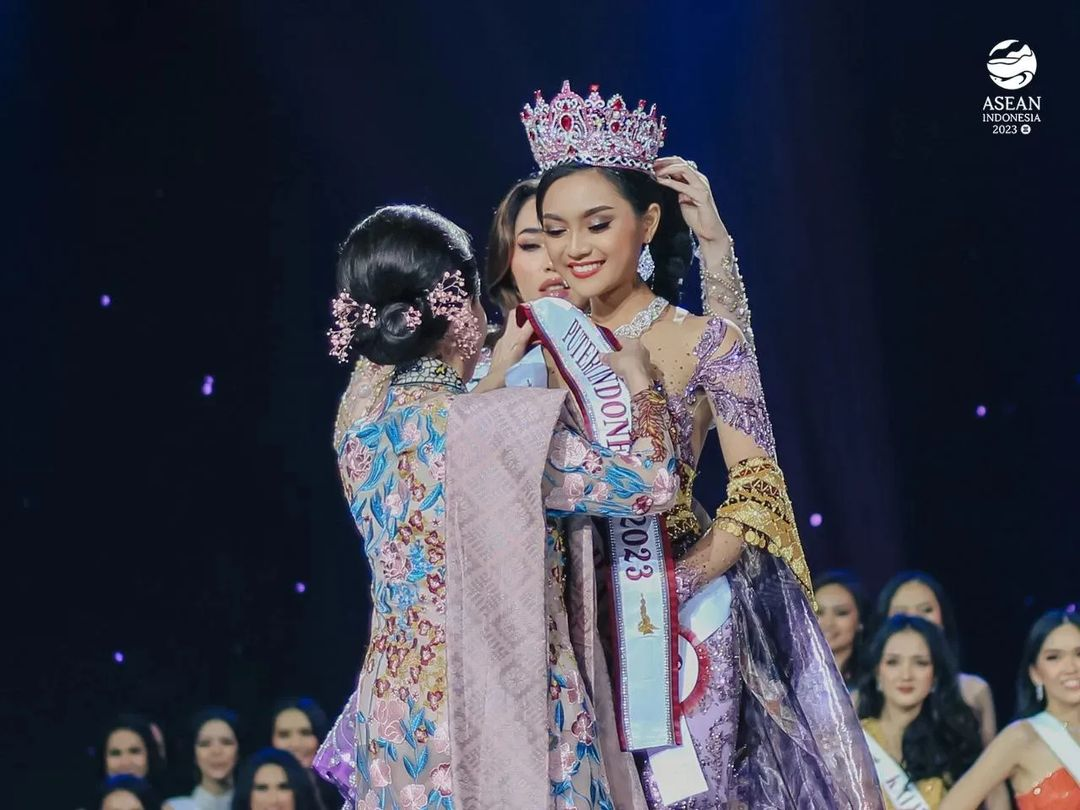
Nariswari when crowned as the winner of Puteri Indonesia 2023 by her predecessor Laksmi De-Neefe Suardana and Putri Kuswisnu Wardani as Chair of the Puteri Indonesia Foundation, on 19 May 2023.

=== Puteri Indonesia 2023 ===
Nariswari represented Jawa Barat 1 at Puteri Indonesia 2023 held at the Jakarta Convention Center, Jakarta, Indonesia, on 19 May 2023.

During the finale, Nariswari was asked by Putri Kuswisnu Wardani the perception between doing something good and doing something right. She answered:

Good evening Indonesia. I believe that doing something good and doing something right are two different things. Doing something good is when we do something based on our intention, our desire. Helping others is something good for example, but it's not always right. However, doing something right is beyond that. It is doing something involving moral values, involving God, and last but not least when you do something that you really really believe deep inside your heart. Thank you.

At the end of the coronation night, Nariswari successfully won the title, being the first West Java representative to win Puteri Indonesia. She was crowned as Puteri Indonesia 2023 by the outgoing titleholder, Laksmi Shari De-Neefe Suardana of Bali. Farhana was crowned along with her fellow Puteri Indonesia queens, Yasinta Aurellia and Lulu Zaharani Krisna Widodo.

=== Miss International 2023 ===
As the main winner of Puteri Indonesia 2023, Nariswari represented Indonesia at Miss International 2023 in Tokyo, Japan, on 26 October 2023. Despite unsuccessfully earning placement spot for Indonesia, she won "Best in Evening Gown" award.

== Gallery ==
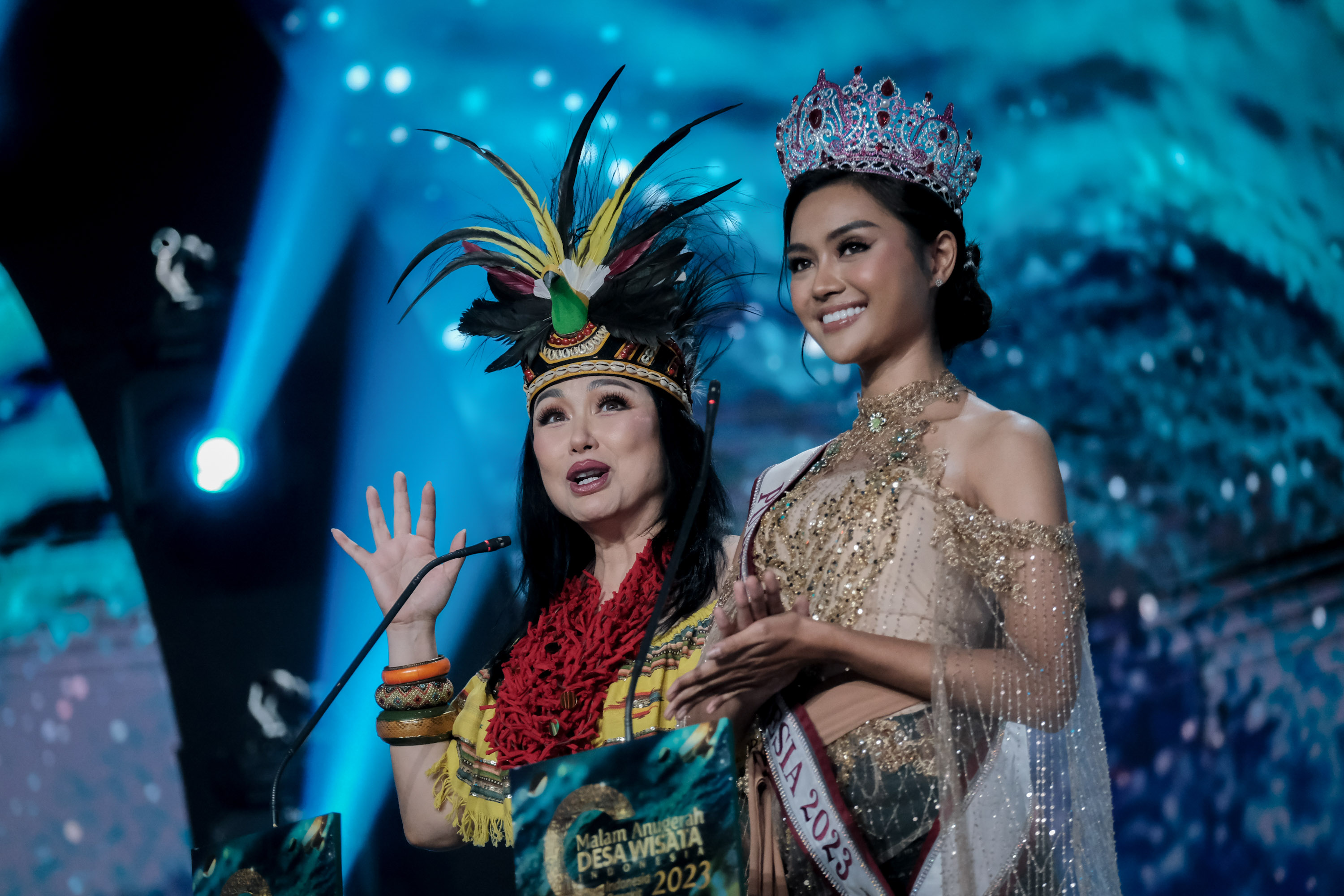
Nariswari with Miss World Indonesia 1983 Titi Dwi Jayati on 2023, attending Anugerah Desa Wisata Indonesia 2023 at Teater Tanah Airku, Taman Mini Indonesia in Jakarta, Indonesia.

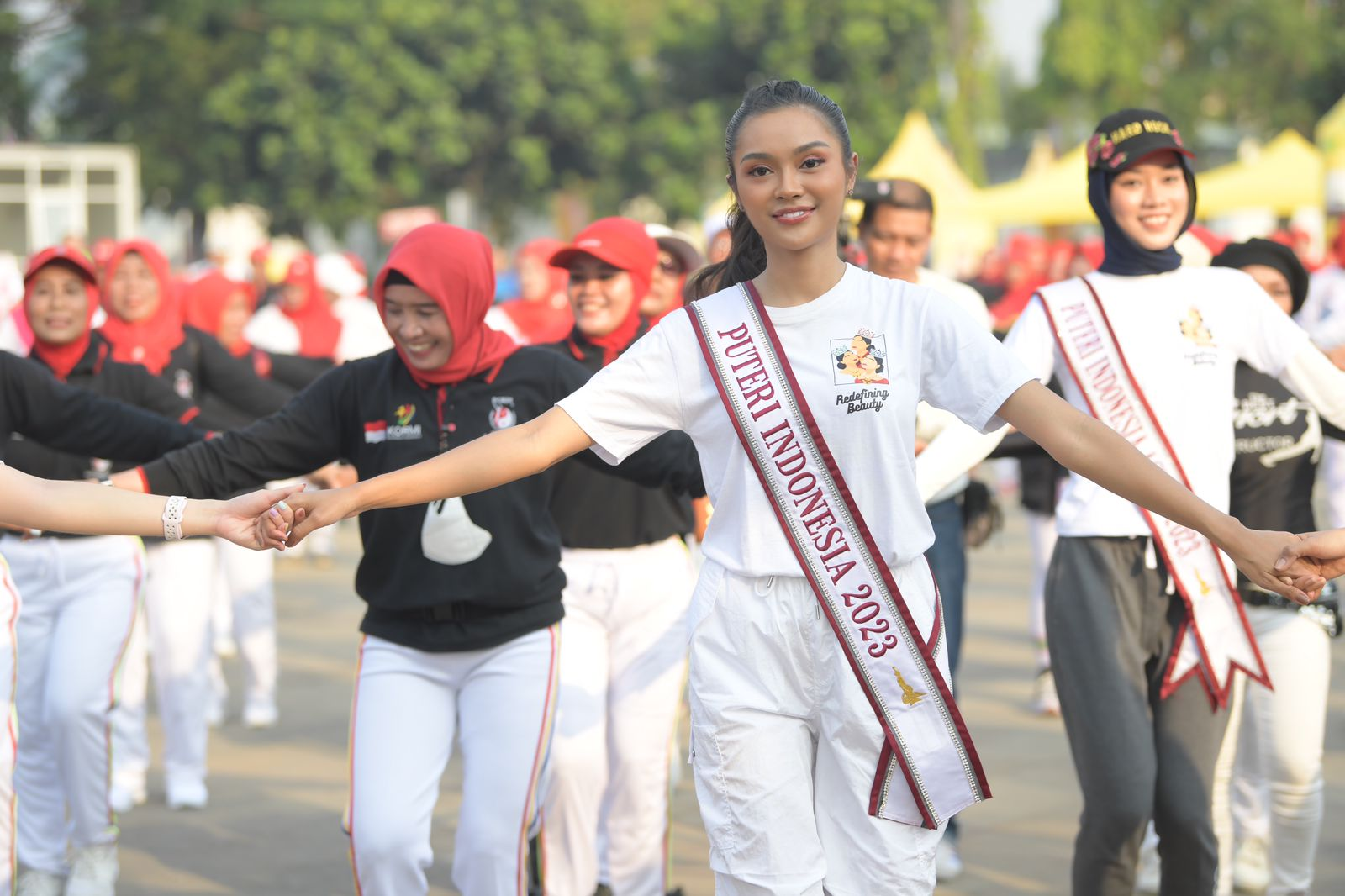
Nariswari participated in a series of commemorations of the 40th National Sports Day (Haornas) in 2023 at the Jakarta International Velodrome Field Complex, on 8 September 2023.

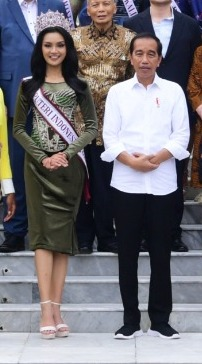
Nariswari next to the President of the Republic of Indonesia, Joko Widodo on 2023 in Istana Negara.

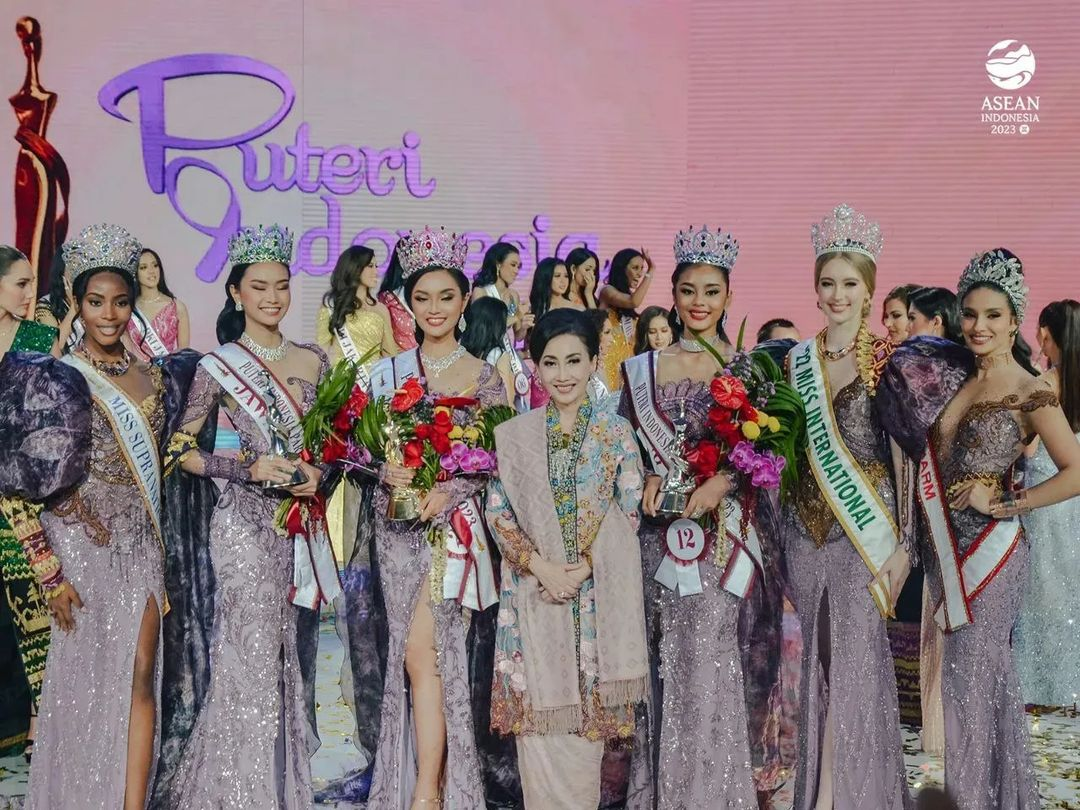
Nariswari (third from the left) along with Puteri Indonesia 2023 Queens during their coronation night, on 19 May 2023.

== See also ==
- Puteri Indonesia 2023
- Miss International 2023
- Yasinta Aurellia
- Lulu Zaharani

== Notes ==
Awards and achievements
Preceded by Melanie Theresia Berentz	Puteri Jawa Barat 1; 2023	Succeeded by Harashta Haifa Zahra
Preceded by Laksmi Shari De-Neefe Suardana	Puteri Indonesia; 2023	Succeeded by Harashta Haifa Zahra
Preceded by Cindy May McGuire	Miss International Indonesia; 2023	Succeeded by Sophie Kirana
