= Ikhia Zodi =

Nigerien politician

Ikhia Aboubekr Zodi (c. 1919 – February 16, 1996) was a Nigerien politician.

== Life and career ==
Born around 1919 at Winditen, Zodi came from a wealthy Tuareg family; his father was a prominent person from Taghagar. He received his primary education in Niamey and his higher education at Ecole William Ponty in Dakar. In 1941 he began teaching for nomadic schools. He went on to become school director, first for the Ecole des enfants de troupe in Bingerville and later Ecole des Kel Gress d'Arzérori.

In 1946, he joined the Nigerien Progressive Party, the Nigerien affiliate of the African Democratic Rally. In 1948 he was elected to the general council of Tahoua. Starting in 1948, he became active in the Nigerien teachers trade union movement. In 1949, he joined the Union of Nigerien Independents and Sympathisers (UNIS), a group affiliated with the Democratic and Socialist Union of the Resistance (UDSR). He was elected to the French National Assembly in the 1951 elections, on the UNIS list headed by Georges Condat (which won both Nigerien seats). The next year he was elected to the Nigerien Territorial Assembly, representing Filingué, and to the Grand Council of French West Africa. He remained in the Grand Council until 1957.

In the French National Assembly, he sat in the UDSR group until 1953. He then joined the Independent Overseas (IOM) group. In the National Assembly, he had several short tenures in the National Education Commission. In January 1953, he was included in the Industrial Production Commission. After his defection to the IOM, Zodi became politically isolated. Zodi stood as a candidate on the UNIS list in the 1956 election. He lost his seat, being roundly defeated by Condat's new list, the Nigerien Action Bloc.

After the election Zodi and his followers regrouped, and on March 6, 1957 they formed a new party called the Nigerien Democratic Front (FDN). FDN was affiliated with the African Convention. He edited the party journal L'Unité (Unity).

When the first government of the Republic of Niger was formed on December 31, 1958, Zodi was appointed Minister of Education, Youth and Sports. In his function as Minister of Education, he came into conflict with the Minister of Interior. In 1960 he was demoted to Secretary of State for National Defense. During this tenure, he visited Israel.

Zodi later became Minister of African Affairs.

In 1963, he took part in a failed coup d'etat. He was arrested and sentenced to death. He was pardoned from execution and his sentence was changed to imprisonment. He was released from jail in 1971. After release from jail, he withdrew from political life. He died in Niamey in 1996.
