= 1951 French legislative election in Niger =

Elections to the French National Assembly were held in Niger on 17 June 1951 as part of the wider French elections. The Union of Nigerien Independents and Sympathisers won both seats, taken by Georges Condat and Zodi Ikhia

== Campaign ==
The Independent List included François Borrey, who had unsuccessfully contested the November 1946 elections, and Dabo Aboudakar.

== Results ==
Party	Votes	%	Seats	+/–
Union of Nigerien Independents and Sympathisers	46,680	83.41	2	+1
Nigerien Progressive Party	7,955	14.21	0	−1
Independent List	1,332	2.38	0	0
Combat List	0	0.00	0	New
Total	55,967	100.00	2	0
Valid votes	55,967	98.89		
Invalid/blank votes	627	1.11		
Total votes	56,594	100.00		
Registered voters/turnout	94,986	59.58		
Source: Sternberger et al.
