= Puteri Indonesia 2023 =

Indonesia beauty pageant competition

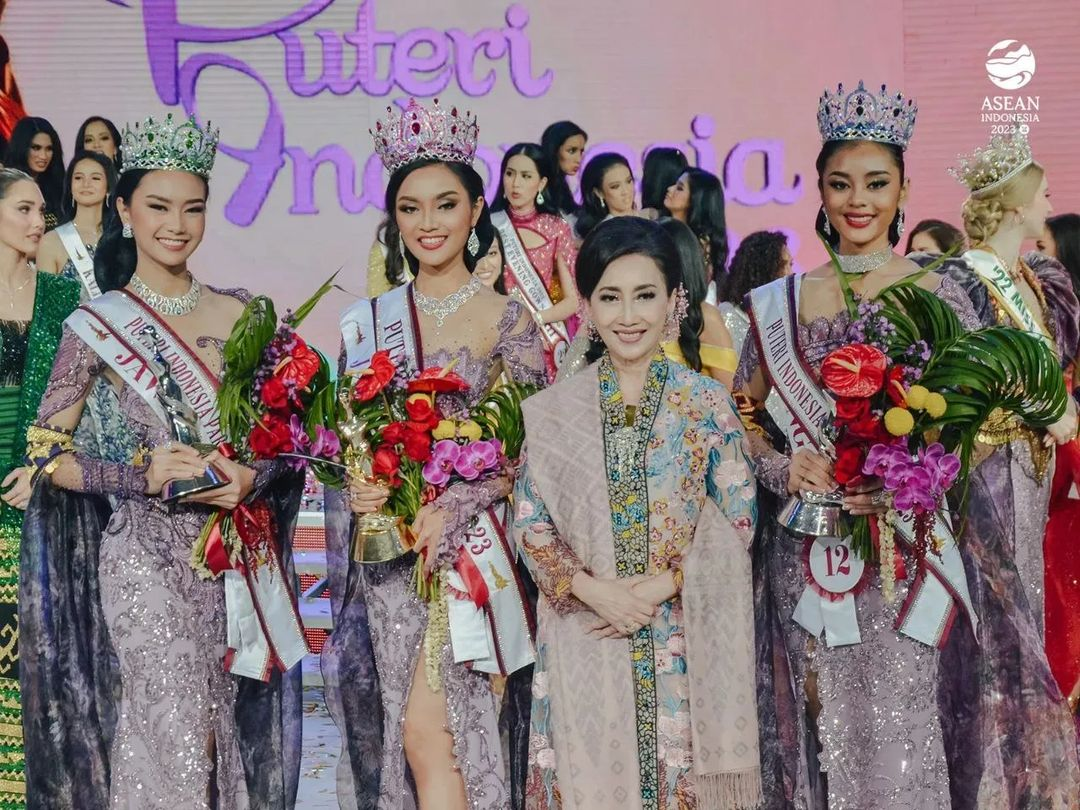
- Yasinta Aurellia, Farhana Nariswari, and Lulu Zaharani
- Date: May 19, 2023
- Presenters: Choky Sitohang; Patricia Gouw
- Entertainment: Andmesh Kamaleng; Lyodra
- Theme: Lampung
- Venue: Jakarta Convention Center, Jakarta, Indonesia
- Broadcaster: SCTV; Vidio
- Entrants: 45
- Placements: 15
- Winner: Farhana Nariswari; West Java 1
- Congeniality: Christine Priscilla Malau, Bangka Belitung 1

Puteri Indonesia 2023, the 26th Puteri Indonesia pageant was held in Jakarta, Indonesia. Puteri Indonesia 2022, Laksmi De-Neefe Suardana of Bali, crowned Farhana Nariswari from West Java 1 as her successor at the end of the event.

Puteri Indonesia 2023 competed at Miss International instead of the usual Miss Universe as Puteri Indonesia Organization lost the right to select and send a representative to the pageant.

Puteri Indonesia Lingkungan 2022 and Puteri Indonesia Pariwisata 2022, Cindy May McGuire of Jakarta SCR 5 and Adinda Cresheilla of East Java, also crowned Yasinta Aurellia from East Java as Puteri Indonesia Lingkungan 2023 and Lulu Zaharani from Lampung as Puteri Indonesia Pariwisata 2023. Puteri Indonesia Lingkungan 2023 represented Indonesia at Miss Supranational 2023, while Puteri Indonesia Pariwisata 2023 represented Indonesia at Miss Charm 2024.

== Background ==
=== Selection of participants ===
10 contestants were chosen from the regional competition held in their respective provinces. They were South Sumatra, Lampung, Banten, East Java, Bali, West Nusa Tenggara, East Kalimantan, South Sulawesi, Central Sulawesi, and North Sulawesi. 29 contestants were selected by judges through an audition held in Jakarta and the remaining six by audiences through public voting; initially, two spots were for alumni who were interested to join again. In total, 45 contestants competed for the title, making it the biggest turnout for Puteri Indonesia to date, beating the previous year's 44 contestants.

== Results ==
=== Main ===
Puteri Indonesia 2023
Puteri Indonesia Lingkungan 2023
Puteri Indonesia Pariwisata 2023

Final results	Contestant	International placement
Puteri Indonesia 2023 (Miss International Indonesia 2023)	West Java 1 – Farhana Nariswari	Unplaced — Miss International 2023
Puteri Indonesia Lingkungan 2023 (Miss Supranational Indonesia 2023)	East Java – Yasinta Aurellia	Top 24 — Miss Supranational 2023
Puteri Indonesia Pariwisata 2023	Lampung – Lulu Zaharani	Withdrew —Miss Charm 2024
Top 6	3rd Runner-Up SR Yogyakarta 1 – Dinda Nur Safira; 4th Runner-Up Jakarta SCR 2 – Puteri Modiyanti §; 5th Runner-Up Bangka Belitung 2 – Patricia Bella Olina § Δ	Did not compete
Top 15	Aceh 2 – Insyira Muthia Khansa; Bali – Anak Agung Sagung Istri Nanda Widya Saraswati; East Kalimantan – Andi Natasya Priyanka Jonsen Simanjuntak; Jakarta SCR 1 – Giok Kinski Maharani Detri Ayusta; Jakarta SCR 5 – Fidelia Prabajati; Jakarta SCR 6 – Sabrina Aisha Putri Eben§; Papua – Yunita Alanda Monim; South Sumatra – Jelita Gabriella Putri; West Nusa Tenggara – Diajeng Aulya Sekartaji	Did not compete

Δ Voted into the Top 6 by viewers
§ Voted into the Top 15 by viewers

=== Special awards ===
Title	Contestant
Puteri Indonesia Persahabatan (Miss Congeniality)	Bangka Belitung 1 – Christine Priscilla Malau
Puteri Indonesia Favorit (Miss Favorite)	Jakarta SCR 2 – Puteri Modiyanti
Puteri Indonesia Intelegensia (Miss Intelligence)	(gold) Jakarta SCR 1 – Giok Kinski Maharani Detri Ayusta; (silver) West Java 1 – Farhana Nariswari Wisandana; (bronze) West Nusa Tenggara – Diajeng Aulya Sekartaji
Puteri Indonesia Berbakat (Miss Talent)	West Papua 1 – Veronica Angelina Windy Hapsari
Best Traditional Costume	Bali – Anak Agung Sagung Istri Nanda Widya Saraswati
Best Evening Gown	(gold) West Nusa Tenggara – Diajeng Aulya Sekartaji; (silver) Central Java – Eudia Isabelle; (bronze) Lampung – Lulu Zaharani Krisna Widodo
Sajani Award by Oppal	East Java – Yasinta Aurellia

== Contestants ==
45 delegates were selected to compete.

Province	Delegate	Age (Note: Ages at the time of the pageant.)	Hometown
Sumatra
Aceh 1	Dwi Annisa Ramadhanty	25	Banda Aceh
Aceh 2	Insyira Muthia Khansa	22	Montasik
North Sumatra	Tabitha Christabela Napitupulu	25	Medan
West Sumatra	Wahyuni Andira Kuruseng	25	Padang
Riau	Nita Indriani	23	Pekanbaru
Riau Islands	Agatha Jessica Margareth Siahaan	23	Batam
Jambi	Sindy Novela	22	Tebo
South Sumatra	Jelita Gabriella Putri	21	Musi Banyuasin
Bangka Belitung 1	Christine Priscilla Malau	25	Sungailiat
Bangka Belitung 2	Patricia Bella Olina	22	Pangkalpinang
Bengkulu	Della Dwi Oktarina	25	Bengkulu
Lampung	Lulu Zaharani	19	West Tulang Bawang
Java
Jakarta SCR 1	Giok Kinski Maharani Detri Ayusta	25	Jakarta
Jakarta SCR 2	Puteri Modiyanti	25	Jakarta
Jakarta SCR 3	Karisha Alifputri	25	Jakarta
Jakarta SCR 4	Juni Safitri	23	Jakarta
Jakarta SCR 5	Fidelia Prabajati	24	Jakarta
Jakarta SCR 6	Sabrina Aisha Putri Eben	24	Jakarta
Banten	Salsabila Dinitasari	25	South Tangerang
West Java 1	Farhana Nariswari Wisandana	26	Bandung
West Java 2	Salma Maulina Wijaya	22	Bandung
Central Java	Eudia Isabelle	26	Brebes
SR Yogyakarta 1	Dinda Nur Safira	23	Sleman
SR Yogyakarta 2	Bianca Havika Aidi	25	Yogyakarta
East Java	Yasinta Aurellia	19	Sidoarjo
Lesser Sunda Islands
Bali	Anak Agung Sagung Istri Nanda Widya Saraswati	20	Denpasar
West Nusa Tenggara	Diajeng Aulya Sekartaji	24	Mataram
East Nusa Tenggara	Alexandra Maria Carla Agnes Nogo Ladjar	23	Lembata
Kalimantan
West Kalimantan	Ashwiza Hanafie	26	Singkawang
South Kalimantan	Flora Gracia Rumenta Siagian	23	Banjarmasin
Central Kalimantan	Adelina Veronica Manurung	22	Palangka Raya
East Kalimantan	Andi Natasya Priyanka Jonsen Simanjuntak	21	Samarinda
North Kalimantan	Mustika Cempaka Dini	22	Tana Tidung
Sulawesi
South Sulawesi	Tita Kamila Syafruddin	24	North Luwu
West Sulawesi 1	May Angel Sembiring	22	Mamasa
West Sulawesi 2	Dita Ayu Wulandari	23	Pasangkayu
Southeast Sulawesi	Sri Rahmisari Rembulan	23	Kendari
Central Sulawesi	Daniella Claudia Aqwila	23	Palu
North Sulawesi	Elisha Gabriell Rosalina Lumintang	22	North Minahasa
Gorontalo	Neunneu Anggraeni Putri	25	Gorontalo
Eastern Indonesia
Maluku	Lady Kendra Pattiata	22	Central Maluku
North Maluku	Calista Sarah Desya Tutuarima	26	North Halmahera
West Papua 1	Veronica Angelina Windy Hapsari	25	Sorong
West Papua 2	Chindy Agata Bosawer	24	Maybrat
Papua	Yunita Alanda Monim	25	Jayapura
