= Union of Nigerien Independents and Sympathisers =

Union of Nigerien Independents and Sympathisers Union nigérienne des indépendants et sympathisants
- Leader: Georges Condat (1948–1953); Ikhia Zodi (1953–1957)
- Founded: May 1948
- Dissolved: 24 February 1957
- Headquarters: Maradi
- Ideology: Conservatism

The Union of Nigerien Independents and Sympathisers (French: Union nigérienne des indépendants et sympathisants, UNIS) was a political party in Niger.

== History ==
UNIS was established in May 1948 by a mix of former members of the Nigerien Progressive Party (PPN) and independents. In a French National Assembly by-election in June that year, its candidate Georges Condat was elected with 72% of the vote. In the full elections in 1951, UNIS won both of the Nigerien seats in the National Assembly.

The 1952 Territorial Assembly elections saw the party win all 35 second college seats. However, it suffered two major splits in the mid-1950s; the first in 1953 followed disagreements about linking with the PPN in order to present a united front, and saw Condat leave to form the Nigerien Progressive Union (UPN). After unsuccessful efforts at uniting the new party with the PPN, Condat rejoined UNIS. The second split in 1955 was caused an attempt by some of its leadership to affiliate UNIS with the Indépendants d'outre-mer group in the French parliament, with the majority of the party leaving to form the Nigerien Action Bloc (BNA).

The 1956 French elections saw UNIS receive only 8% of the vote and lose both seats, with a BNA–UPN alliance and PPN winning one each. UNIS was subsequently dissolved when Zodi Ikhia established the Nigerien Democratic Front in 1957.
