= Nigerien Democratic Front =

The Nigerien Democratic Front (French: Front démocratique nigérien, FDN) was a political party in Niger. It published the party journal L'Unité ('Unity').

== History ==
The party was founded by Zodi Ikhia and his followers on March 6, 1957, assembling the remainder of the Union of Nigerien Independents and Sympathisers. It became a Nigerien affiliate of the African Convention, an inter-territorial political party led by Léopold Sédar Senghor.

The FDN contested the March 1957 Territorial Assembly elections, but received 0.5% of the vote and failed to win a seat.
