= 1956 French legislative election in Niger =

Elections to the French National Assembly were held in Niger on 2 January 1956 as part of the wider French elections. The Nigerien Progressive Party (PPN) and the Nigerien Action Bloc−Nigerien Progressive Union (BNA−UPN) alliance won one seat each. Georges Condat took the BNA−UPN seat, whilst Hamani Diori took the PPN seat.

== Campaign ==
The Independent List included François Borrey, who had unsuccessfully contested the November 1946 elections, and Dabo Aboudakar.

== Results ==
Party	Votes	%	Seats	+/–
BNA−UPN	125,425	40.99	1	New
Nigerien Progressive Party	82,108	26.83	1	+1
Nigerien Democratic Union	74,107	24.22	0	New
Union of Nigerien Independents and Sympathisers	24,345	7.96	0	−2
Total	305,985	100.00	2	0
Valid votes	305,985	98.27		
Invalid/blank votes	5,376	1.73		
Total votes	311,361	100.00		
Registered voters/turnout	697,488	44.64		
Source: Sternberger et al.
