= Nigerien Progressive Union =

Former Nigerien political party

The Nigerien Progressive Union (French: Union progressiste nigérienne, UPN) was a political party in Niger led by Georges Condat.

== History ==
The party was founded on March 15, 1953, as a breakaway from the Union of Nigerien Independents and Sympathisers (UNIS) over the issue of forming a united front with the Nigerien Progressive Party.

A joint list of UPN and the Nigerien Action Bloc (BNA) of Issoufou Saïdou Djermakoye received some 126,000 votes in the January 1956 French parliamentary elections. The list was the most voted-for, finishing in first place in seven provinces, and Condat won one of the two seats in the French National Assembly. The UPN later merged into BNA.
