= National Development University "Veteran" of East Java =

Coordinates: 7°20′01″S 112°47′19″E

- Motto: "Inovasi, Prestasi, Sukses"
- Type: Public University
- Established: 5 July 1959; 65 years ago
- President: Prof. Dr. Ir. Akhmad Fauzi, MMT, IPU.
- Location: Surabaya, Indonesia
- Website: http://www.upnjatim.ac.id

The National Development University "Veteran" of East Java (Indonesian: Universitas Pembangunan Nasional "Veteran" Jawa Timur) is a public university located in Surabaya, East Java, Indonesia which was established on July 5, 1959. UPN "Veteran" in East Java is a very large institution with 20,000 students from various provinces in Indonesia as well as foreign students. UPN “Veteran” in East Java was founded by veterans of freedom fighters as a living monument to the development of education in Indonesia. In its development, UPN "Veteran" in East Java has undergone several name and status changes. This 63-year-old Indonesian university has a selective admission policy based on entrance exams. An acceptance rate range of 0-10% makes this Indonesian higher education organization a highly selective institution. International applicants are eligible to apply. UPN also provides several academic and non-academic facilities and services to students, including libraries, dormitories, sports facilities, financial assistance and/or scholarships, study abroad and exchange programs, as well as administrative services.

== History ==
- From 1959 to 1965 it was named the Academy of Corporate Administration Veteran Surabaya Branch.
- In 1968 it changed its name to the National Higher Education Development "Veteran" East Java Branch.
- From 1976 to 1994 it was in transition as Veteran East Java Branch as a university under the guidance of the Department of Defense and Security Affairs.
- In 1977 the name was changed to the National Development University Veteran East Java Branch.
- In 1995 it became a private university with the name of University of Pembangunan Nasional Veteran at East Java. It is operationally under the guidance of the Foundation of Kejuangan Panglima Sudirman and functionally under the guidance of the Department of Defense and Security Affairs.
- In 2007 University of Pembangunan National Veteran came under the guidance of the Foundation of Education and Welfare, which is functionally under the guidance of the Ministry of Defense.
- In 2014 UPN Veteran at East Java became a public university.

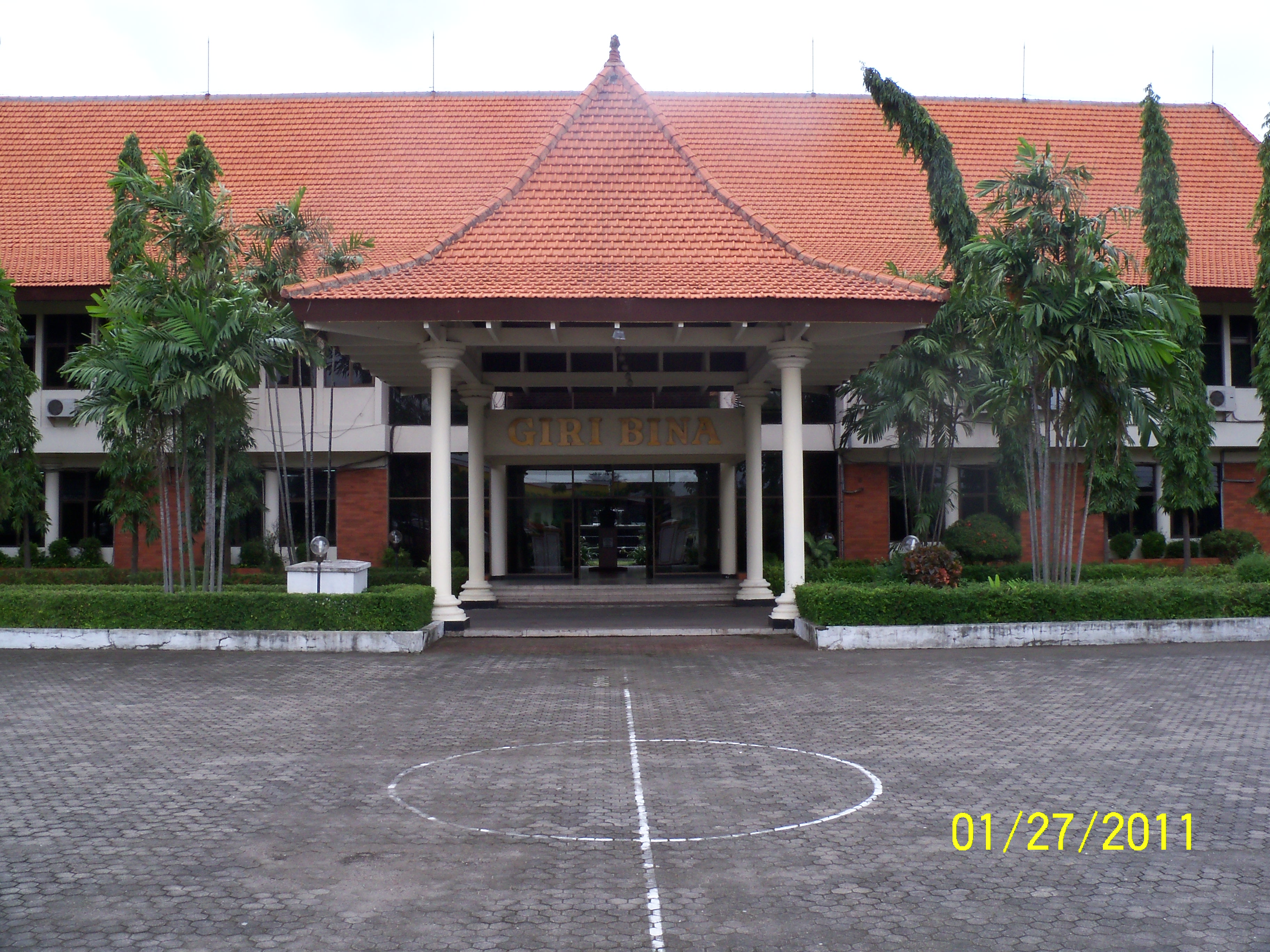
Rectorate

== Faculty ==
UPN Veteran has seven faculties (colleges) with 19 study and postgraduate programs.

- Faculty of Economics and Business
  - Economic Development Department
  - Management Department
  - Accounting Department
- Faculty of Social and Political Sciences
  - Public Administration Department
  - Business Administration Department
  - Communication Science Department
  - International Relations Department
  - Tourism Department
- Faculty of Law
  - Law Science Department
- Faculty of Agriculture
  - Agrotechnology Department
  - Master of Agrotechnology Department
  - Agribusiness Department
- Faculty of Engineering
  - Chemical Engineering Department
  - Industrial Engineering Department
  - Civil Engineering Department
  - Environmental Engineering Department
  - Food Technology Department
  - Machine Engineering Department
- Faculty of Computer Sciences
  - Informatics Engineering Department
  - Information System Department
  - Data Science Department
- Faculty of Architecture and Design
  - Architecture Department
  - Visual Communication Design Department
- Graduate program
  - Master of Agribusiness Department
  - Master of Management Department
  - Master of Accounting Department
  - Master of Environment Department
  - Master of Agrotechnology Department
- Doctor of Philosophy
  - Doctor of Agribusiness Department

== Facilities ==
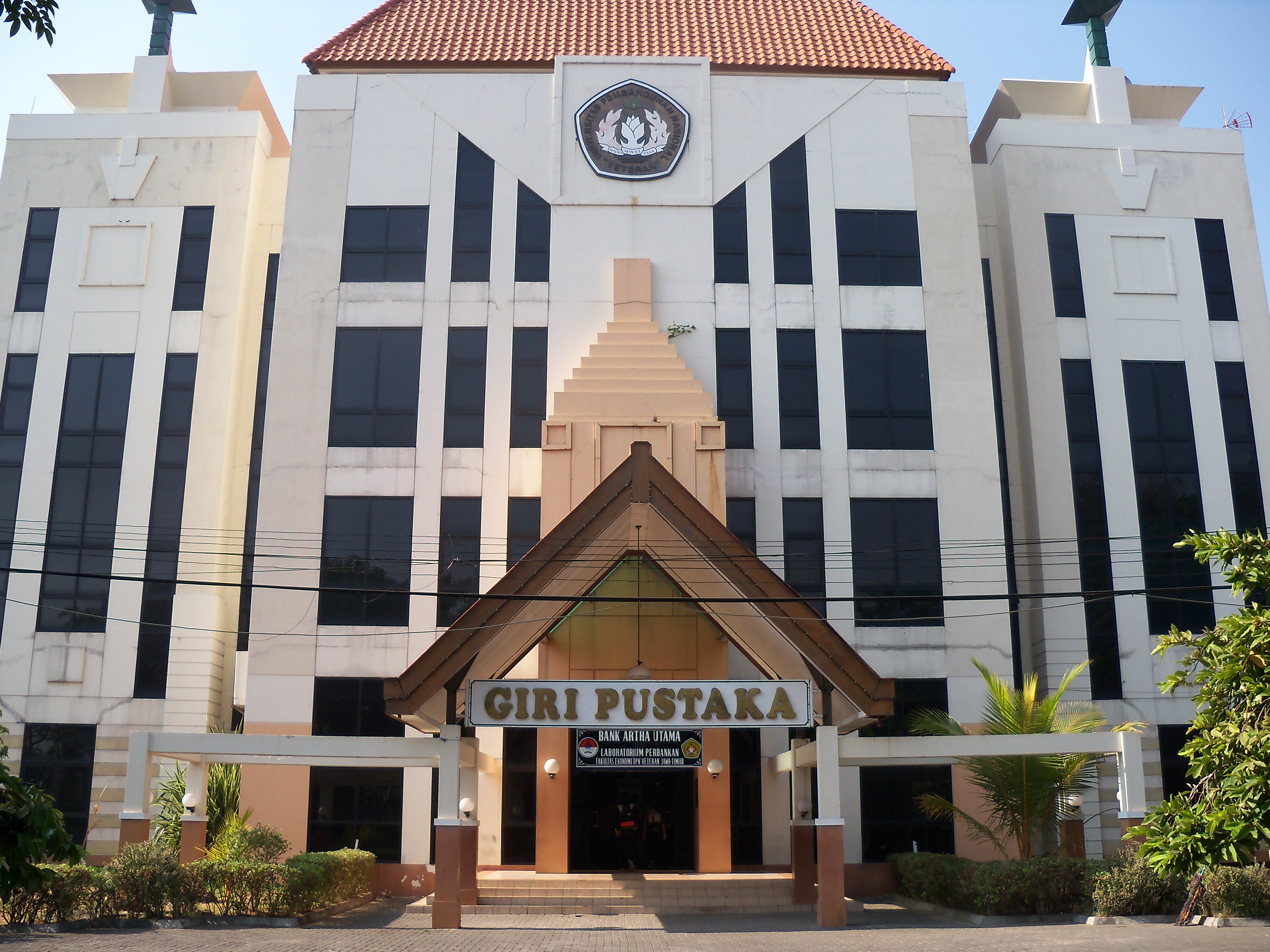
University library

- Library (text books, reference books, research journals, magazines, scripts, theses)
- Information Communication and Computer Center and hotspots (WiFi area)
- Language Center (English, French, Mandarin and German)
- Polyclinic (health care)
- Sports Center (Olympic standard swimming pool, tennis courts, soccer field, basketball court)
- Multipurpose building for sports, graduation, arts and exhibitions
- Greenhouse and field laboratory for agriculture research
- Guest house capacity (10 rooms)
- Students' dormitory for 400 students (with a meeting hall and parking area)
