= Lulu Zaharani =

Indonesian beauty pageant titleholder

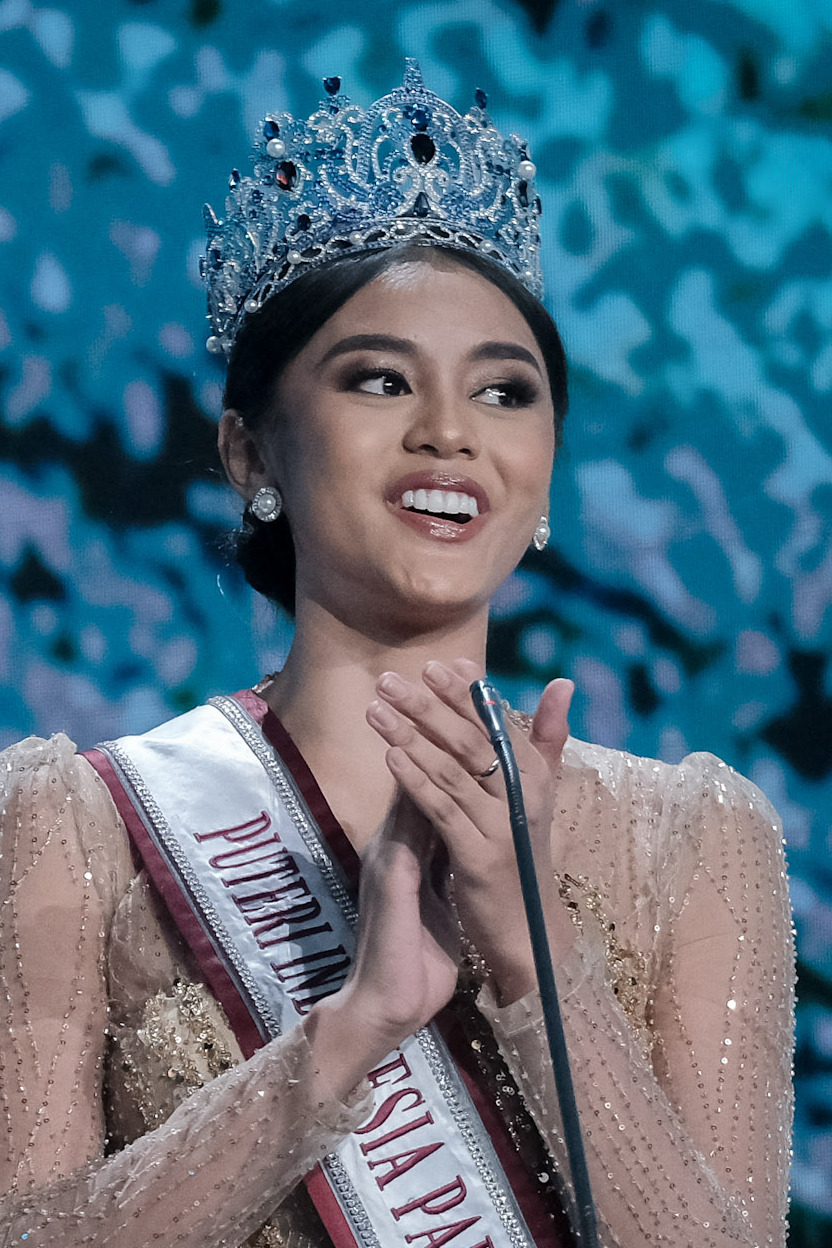
- Zaharani in August 2023
- Born: Lulu Zaharani Krisna Widodo; 16 December 2003 (age 22); Bandar Lampung, Lampung
- Education: Bandar Lampung University
- Occupation: Indonesian Ministry of Tourism and Creative Economy Ambassador
- Beauty pageant titleholder
- Title: Puteri Indonesia Lampung 2023; Puteri Indonesia Pariwisata 2023; Miss Charm Indonesia 2024
- Major competitions: Puteri Indonesia Lampung 2023; (Winner); Puteri Indonesia 2023; (2nd Runner-up – Puteri Indonesia Pariwisata 2023); Miss Charm 2024; (Withdrew)

Lulu Zaharani Krisna Widodo (born 16 Desember 2003) is an Indonesian Ministry of Tourism and Creative Economy Ambassador, and beauty pageant titleholder who was crowned as Puteri Indonesia Pariwisata 2023. Zaharani was scheduled to represent Indonesia at Miss Charm 2024, but she chose to withdraw and replaced by the next titleholder.

== Early life and education ==
Zaharani completed her high school education from SMAN 1 Tumijajar in Tulang Bawang Barat Regency, Lampung. Currently, she is a Communication Science student at "Bandar Lampung University" in Bandar Lampung, Lampung. Zaharani started her career as a retired Paskibraka for Lampung Province in 2019.

== Career ==
In May 2023, Zaharani was appointed as one of brand ambassadors for Bank Central Asia Indonesia as part of a collaboration between PT Bank Central Asia and Puteri Indonesia 2023 to find women with potential to promote their products. The appointment was conveyed by Mustika Ratu Entertainment, a subsidiary of PT Mustika Ratu Tbk.

== Pageantry ==
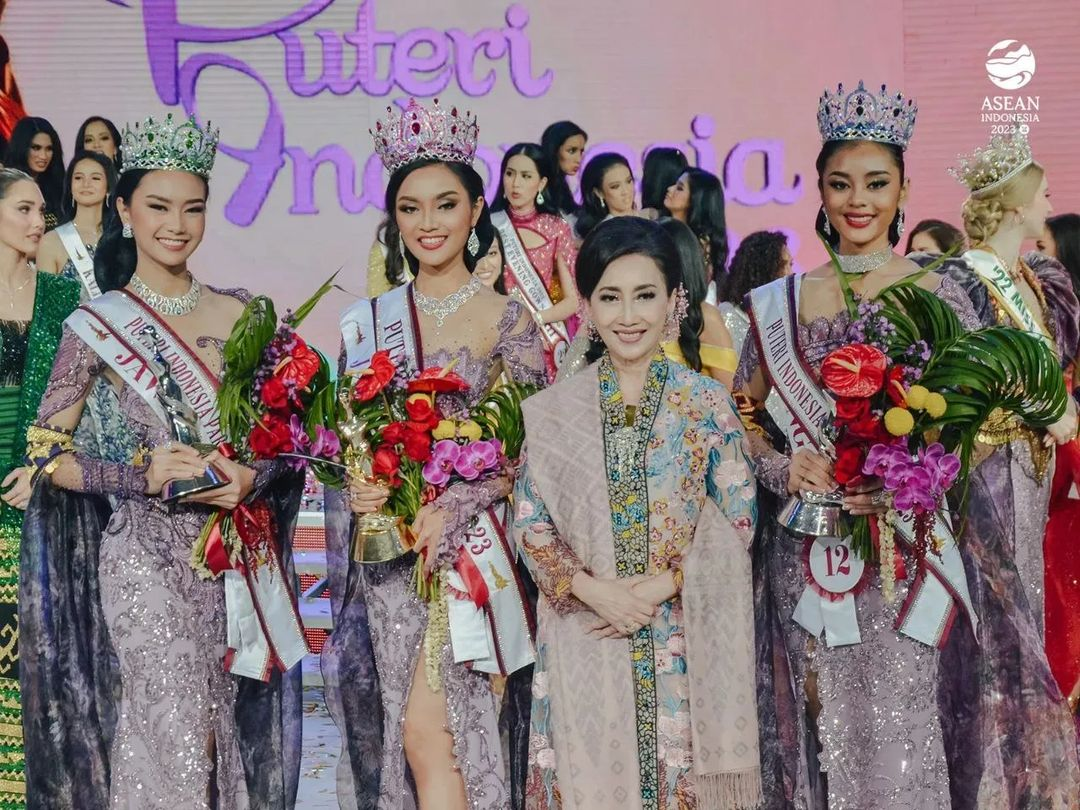
Zaharani (right) after winning Puteri Indonesia Pariwisata 2023, along with the two other winners and Putri Kus Wisnu Wardani, Chair of the Advisory Board of Puteri Indonesia Foundation

Zaharani began her pageantry career by taking part in the Muli Menganai Tulang Bawang Barat Election, where she was first runner-up in Muli Tulang Bawang Barat 2020. She then took part in the Muli Menganai ambassador contest for Tulang Bawang Regency and was selected as Muli Tulang Bawang 2022. In August 2022, Zaharani was selected as Muli Lampung 2022 at the 2022 Muli Mekhanai Lampung Province contest.

=== Puteri Indonesia Lampung 2023 ===
At the end of 2022, Zaharani participated in, and won the provincial level contest Puteri Indonesia 2023, held at the Radisson Hotel in Bandar Lampung on December 24, 2022. With this title, Zaharani had the right to represent the province of Lampung at the national level Puteri Indonesia 2023.

=== Puteri Indonesia 2023 ===
Zaharani represented the province of Lampung at the national beauty contest Puteri Indonesia 2023, at the Plenary Hall, Jakarta Convention Center in Central Jakarta on May 19, 2023.

In the final round, Zaharani was asked by the Chair of the Advisory Board of Puteri Indonesia Foundation, Putri Kus Wisnu Wardani about whether there is a difference between doing good and doing right. She answered:

In my opinion, doing good and doing right are two different things. Doing good is when we say something that can be accepted by many people, doing it from heart to heart. But doing the right thing is doing it logically, it's true in the situation. Thank You.

Zaharani was second runner up and received the title of Puteri Indonesia Pariwisata 2023 from the previous titleholder Adinda Cresheilla from East Java. As Puteri Indonesia Pariwisata 2023, Zaharani had the right to represent Indonesia at Miss Charm 2024. Due to the postponement of the contest, she withdrew and was replaced by Melati Tedja, the next titleholder.

Awards and achievements
Preceded by Feby Annisa; Irene Garcia	Puteri Lampung; 2023	Succeeded by Nabilah Rohma Balqis
Preceded by Adinda Cresheilla (East Java)	Puteri Indonesia Pariwisata; 2023	Succeeded by Permata Juliastrid (Bali)
