= Cinema of Africa =

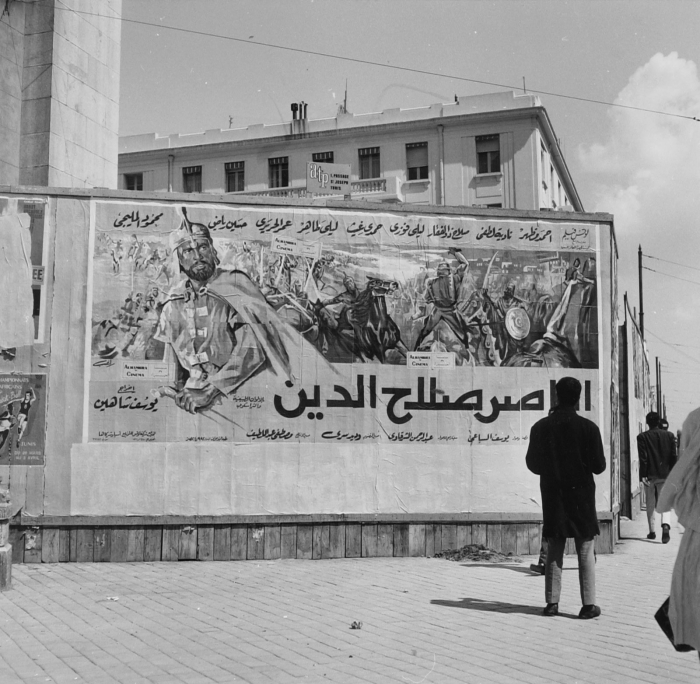
Cinematic street poster in Tunis, Tunisia for the Egyptian film Saladin the Victorious (1963, Arabic: الناصر صلاح الدين, Al Nasser Salah Ad-Din) directed by Youssef Chahine starring Ahmed Mazhar as Saladin, Salah Zulfikar, Nadia Lutfi and others

Cinema of Africa refers to the film industries and films produced in the continent of Africa. It covers both the history and present of the making or screening of films on the African continent, and also refers to the persons involved in this form of audiovisual culture. It dates back to the late 19th century, when film reels were the primary cinematic technology in use. Cairo has been the capital of the film industry in Africa from the early 20th century to the present day.

As there are more than 50 countries with audiovisual traditions, there is no single 'African cinema'. Both historically and culturally, there are major regional differences between North African and sub-Saharan cinemas, and between the cinemas of different countries. The Egyptian and the Tunisian film industries are also among the oldest in the world. The cinema of Egypt in particular is the most established and flourishing industry in Africa. Pioneers Auguste and Louis Lumière screened their films in Alexandria, Cairo, Tunis, Susa, Libya and Hammam-Lif, Tunisia, in 1896. Albert Samama Chikly is often cited as the first producer of indigenous African cinema, screening his own short documentaries in the casino of Tunis as early as December 1905.

The first film to be produced was 1923's Barsoum Looking for a Job in Egypt. Alongside his daughter Haydée Tamzali, Chikly would go on to produce important early milestones such as 1924's The Girl from Carthage. In 1927, Egypt produced Laila, the first feature-length film produced by Aziza Amir and directed by Stephan Rosti and Wedad Orfi. In 1935, the Studio Misr in Cairo began producing mostly formulaic comedies and musicals, but also films like Kamal Selim's The Will (1939). Egyptian cinema flourished in the 1940s, 1950s, and 1960s, considered its Golden Age. Youssef Chahine's seminal Cairo Station (1958) laid the foundation for Arab film.

The Egyptian film industry is the largest in Africa in terms of revenue and popularity, while the Nigerian film industry is the largest in terms of volume and number of annual films, it is also the second largest film producer in the world. In 2016, Nigeria's film industry contributed 2.3% to its gross domestic product (GDP).

== History ==
=== Colonial era ===
During the colonial era, Africa was represented largely by Western filmmakers. In the first decades of the twentieth century, Western filmmakers made films that depicted black Africans as "exoticized", "submissive workers" or as "savage or cannibalistic". For example, see Kings of the Cannibal Islands in 1909, Voodoo Vengeance (1913) and Congorilla (1932). The first film to be produced was the Egyptian film Barsoum Looking for a Job (1923).

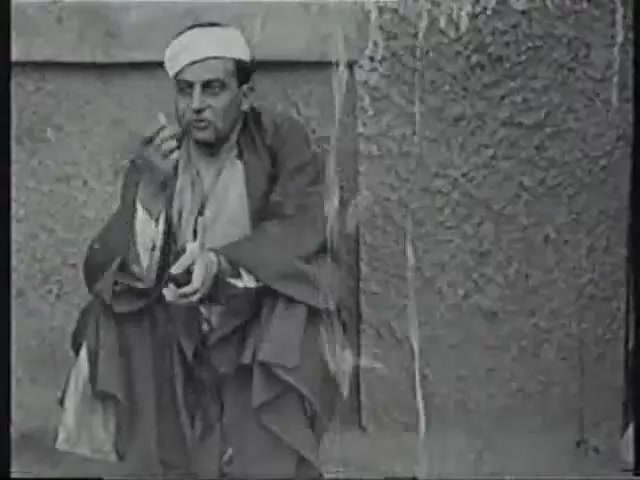
Bishara Wakim in Barsoum Looking for a Job (1923), the first African film production.

Colonial era films portrayed Africa as exotic, without history or culture. Examples abound and include jungle epics based on the Tarzan character created by Edgar Rice Burroughs, and the adventure film The African Queen (1951), and various adaptations of H. Rider Haggard's novel King Solomon's Mines (1885).

One of the first films to be entirely produced in Africa was the South African dramatic film The Great Kimberley Diamond Robbery (1911). It was followed by De Voortrekkers (1916), South Africa's (and possibly Africa's) first epic film and oldest surviving film, about the Great Trek and targeted at an Afrikaner audience. A notable theme in early South African cinema was the ethnic confrontation between Afrikaner (specifically Boer) and British South Africans.

Much early ethnographic cinema "focused on highlighting the differences between indigenous people and the white civilised man, thus reinforcing colonial propaganda". Marc Allégret's first film,Voyage au Congo (1927) respectfully portrayed the Masa people, in particular a young African entertaining his little brothers with a baby crocodile on a string. Yet Africans were portrayed merely as human, but not equals; a dialogue card, for example, referred to the movements of a traditional dance as naive. His lover, writer André Gide, accompanied Allégret and wrote a book, also titled Voyage au Congo. Allégret later made Zouzou, starring Josephine Baker, the first major film starring a black woman. Baker had caused a sensation in the Paris arts scene by dancing in the Revue Nègre clad only in a string of bananas.

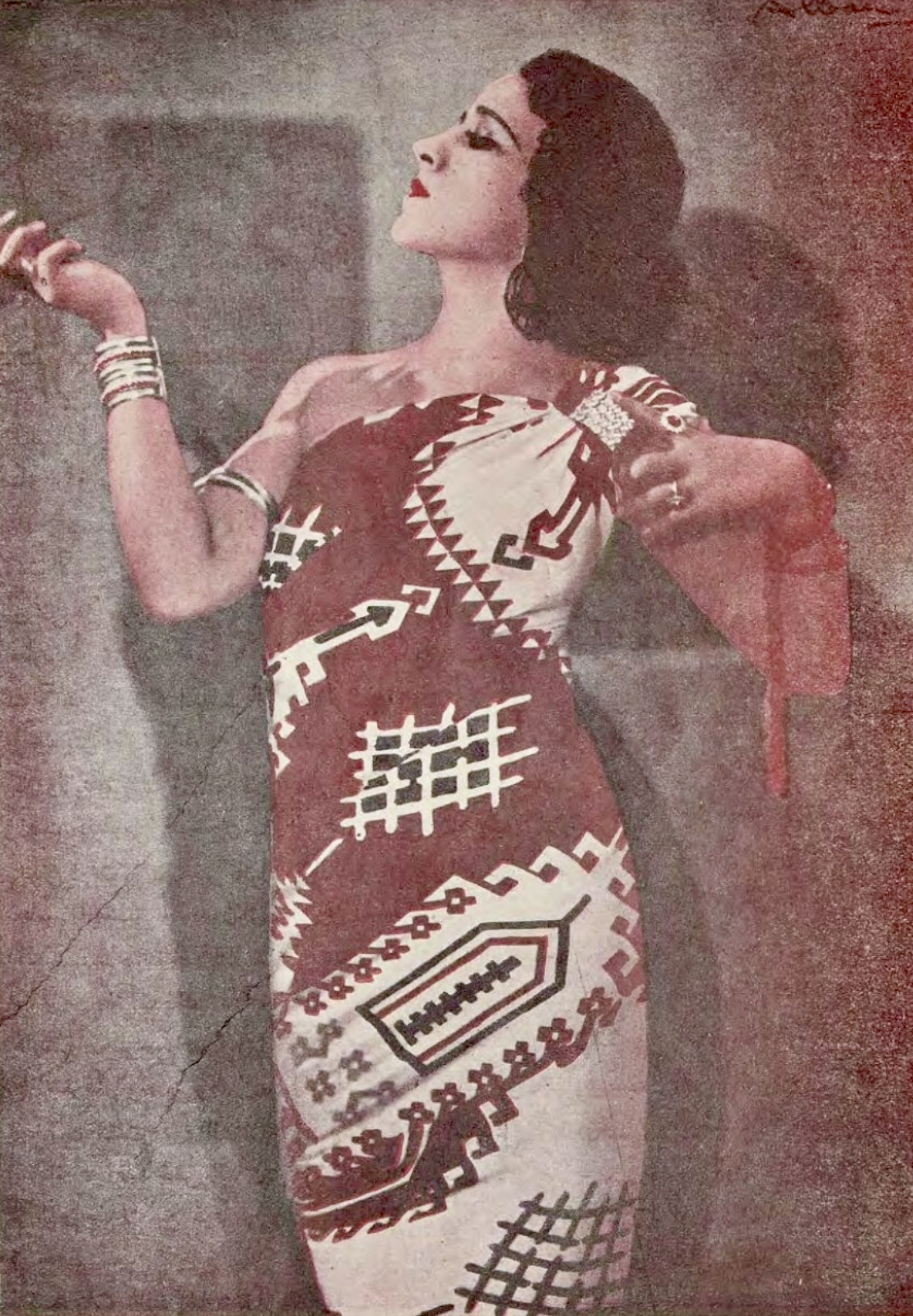
Egyptian filmmaker and actress Bahiga Hafez (1908–1983) in the 1930s

In the French colonies, Africans were prohibited by the 1934 Laval Decree from making films of their own. The ban stunted the growth of film as a means of African expression, political, cultural, and artistic. Congolese Albert Mongita did make The Cinema Lesson in 1951 and in 1953 Mamadou Touré made Mouramani based on a folk story about a man and his dog. In 1955, Paulin Soumanou Vieyra – originally from Benin, but educated in Senegal – along with his colleagues from Le Group Africain du Cinema, shot a short film in Paris, Afrique-sur-Seine (1955). Vieyra was trained in filmmaking at the Institut des hautes études cinématographiques (IDHEC) in Paris, and despite the ban on filmmaking in Africa, was granted permission to make a film in France. Considered the first film directed by a black African, Afrique Sur Seine explores the difficulties of being an African in 1950s France.

Portuguese colonies came to independence with no film production facilities at all, since the colonial government there restricted film-making to colonialist propaganda, emphasizing the inferiority of indigenous populations. Therefore, little thought was given until independence to developing authentic African voices.

In the mid-1930s, the Bantu Educational Kinema Experiment in eastern and south-eastern African countries was conducted in an attempt to "educate the Bantu, mostly about hygiene. Only three films from this project survive; they are kept at the British Film Institute.

Before the colonies' independence, few anti-colonial films were produced. Examples include Statues Also Die (Les statues meurent aussi) by Chris Marker and Alain Resnais, about European theft of African art; the second half of the film was banned for years by the French authorities. The 1950 film Afrique 50 by René Vautier, showed anti-colonial riots in Côte d'Ivoire and in Upper Volta (now Burkina Faso), and was likewise banned, with Vautier being jailed for several months.

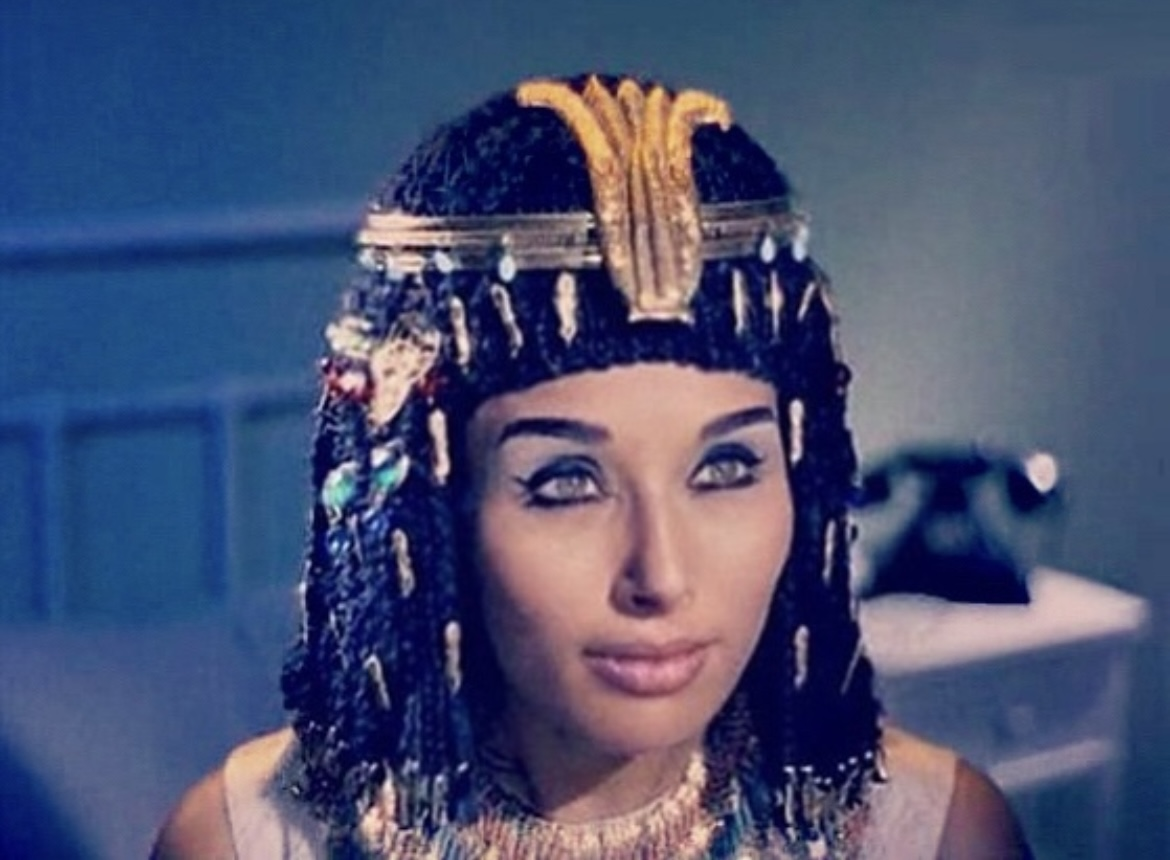
Lobna Abdel Aziz in Bride of the Nile (1963)

Also doing film work in Africa at this time was French ethnographic filmmaker Jean Rouch, controversial with both French and African audiences. Film documentaries such as Jaguar (1955), Les maitres fous (1955), Moi, un noir (1958) and La pyramide humaine (1961). Rouch's documentaries were not explicitly anti-colonial, but did challenge perceptions of colonial Africa and give a new voice to Africans. Although Rouch was accused by Ousmane Sembene and others of seeing Africans "as if they are insects," Rouch was an important figure in the developing field of African film and was the first person to work with Africans, of whom many had important careers in African cinema (Oumarou Ganda, Safi Faye and Moustapha Alassane, and others).

Because most films made prior to independence were egregiously racist in nature, African filmmakers of the independence era, – such as Ousmane Sembene and Oumarou Ganda, among others – saw filmmaking as an important political tool for rectifying the image of Africans put forward by Western filmmakers and for reclaiming the image of Africa for Africans.

=== Post-independence and 1970s ===
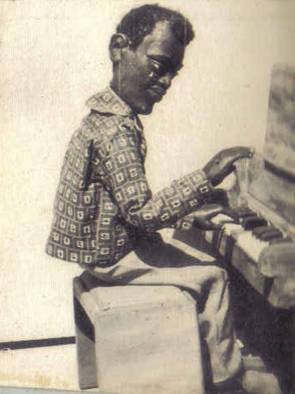
The Ghana Broadcasting Puppet Show developed by Beattie Casely-Hayford (1968)

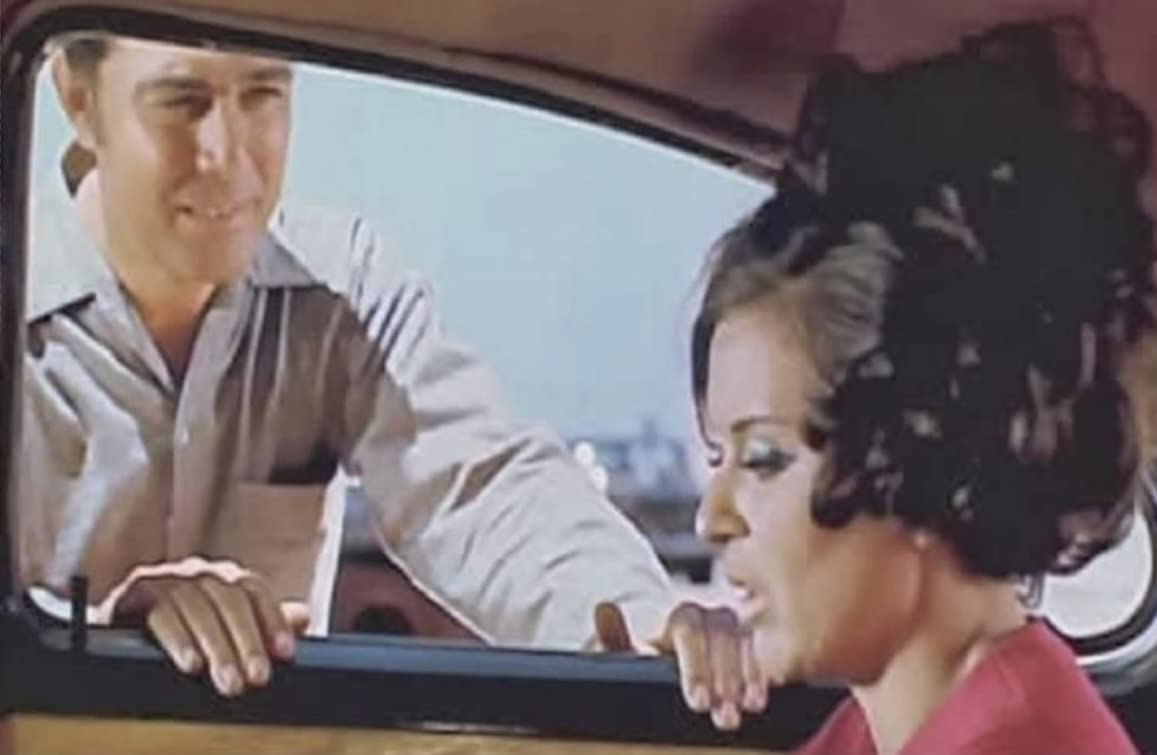
Salah Zulfikar and Soad Hosny in the Egyptian film Those People of the Nile (Egyptian Arabic: الناس والنيل, Al Nass Wal Nil) directed by Youssef Chahine (1972)

The first African film to win international recognition was Sembène Ousmane's La Noire de... also known as Black Girl. It showed the despair of an African woman who has to work as a maid in France. It won the Prix Jean Vigo in 1966. Initially a writer, Sembène had turned to cinema to reach a wider audience. He is still considered the "father of African cinema". Sembène's native Senegal continued to be the most important place of African film production for more than a decade.

With the creation of the African film festival FESPACO in today's Burkina Faso in 1969, African film created its own forum. FESPACO now takes place every two years in alternation with the Carthago film festival in Tunisia.

The Pan African Federation of Filmmakers (Fédération Panafricaine des Cinéastes, or FEPACI) was formed in 1969 to promote African film industries in terms of production, distribution and exhibition. From its inception, FEPACI was seen as a critical partner organization to the Organisation of African Unity (OAU), now the African Union. FEPACI looks at the role of film in the politico-economic and cultural development of African states and the continent as a whole.

Med Hondo's Soleil O, shot in 1969, was immediately recognized. No less politically engaged than Sembène, he chose a more controversial filmic language to show what it means to be a stranger in France with the "wrong" skin colour.

=== 1980s and 1990s ===
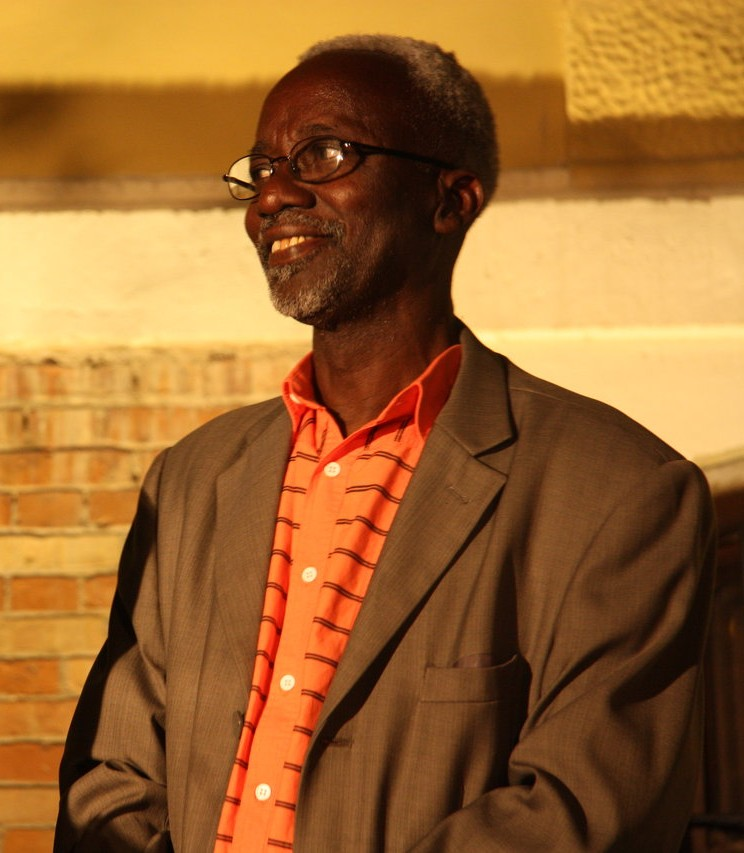
Malian film director Souleymane Cissé at the third International Festival "Cines del Sur" in Granada, 2009

Souleymane Cissé's Yeelen (Mali, 1987) was the first film made by a Black African to compete at Cannes. Cheick Oumar Sissoko's Guimba (Mali, 1995) was also well received in the West. Many films of the 1990s, including Quartier Mozart by Jean-Pierre Bekolo (Cameroon, 1992), are situated in the globalized African metropolis.

Nigerian cinema experienced a large growth in the 1990s with the increasing availability of home video cameras in Nigeria, and soon put Nollywood in the nexus for West African English-language films. Nollywood produced 1844 movies in 2013 alone.

The last movie theatre in Kinshasa, Democratic Republic of the Congo, shut down in 2004. Many of the former cinemas were converted to churches. In 2009 the UN refugee agency screened Breaking the Silence in South Kivu and Katanga Province. The film deals with rape in the Congolese civil wars In neighboring Brazzaville, Republic of the Congo, a 200-seat cinema, MTS Movies House, opened in 2016, and in April 2018, construction began on another new cinema .

A first African Film Summit took place in South Africa in 2006. It was followed by FEPACI 9th Congress. The Africa Movie Academy Awards were launched in 2004, marking the growth of local film industries like that of Nigeria as well as the development and spread of the film industry culture in sub-Saharan Africa.

=== 2000s and 2010s ===
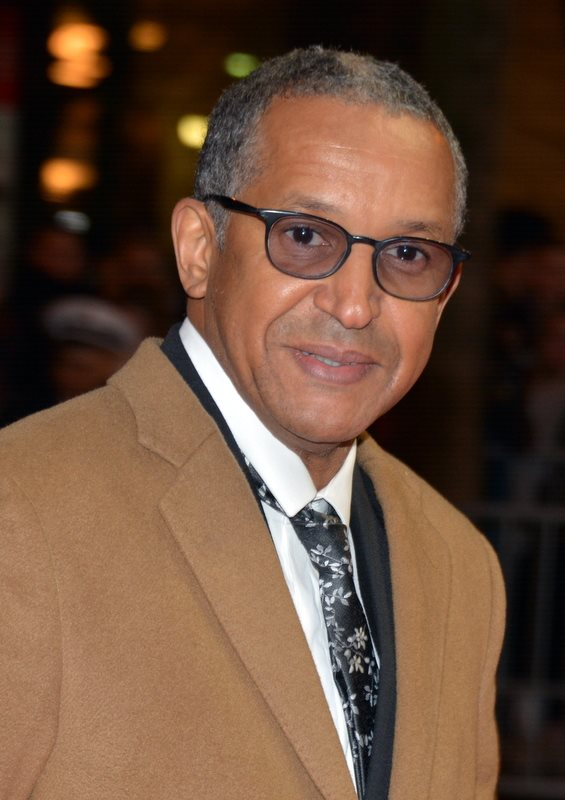
Abderrahmane Sissako at the ceremony of the César Awards, Paris in 2016

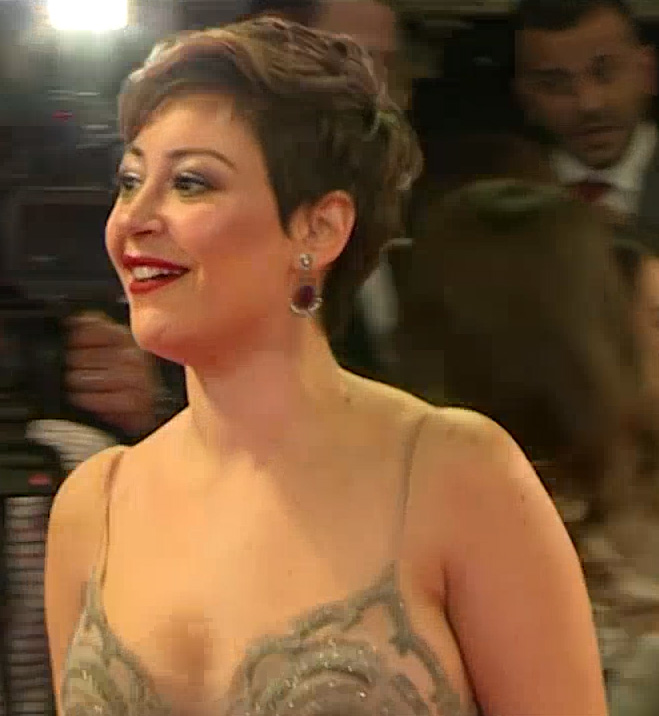
Menna Shalabi, Egyptian film star

Contemporary African cinema deals with a wide variety of themes relating to modern issues and universal problems.

Migration and relations between African and European countries is a common theme among many African films. Abderrahmane Sissako's film Waiting for Happiness portrays a Mauritanian city struggling against foreign influences through the journey of a migrant coming home from Europe. Migration is also an important theme in Mahamat Saleh Haroun's film Une Saison en France, which shows the journey of a family from the Central African Republic seeking asylum in France. Haroun is part of the Chadian diaspora in France, and uses the film to explore aspects of this diasporan experience.

Africanfuturism and Afrofuturism is a growing genre, encompassing Africans both on the continent and in the diaspora who tell science or speculative fiction stories involving Africa and African people. Neill Blomkamp's District 9 is a well-known example, portraying an alien invasion of South Africa. Wanuri Kahiu's short film Pumzi portrays the futuristic fictional Maitu community in Africa 35 years after World War III.

Directors including Haroun and Kahiu have expressed concerns about the lack of cinema infrastructure and appreciation in various African countries. However, organizations such as the Changamoto arts fund are providing more resources and opportunities to African filmmakers.

=== 2020s ===
Some African countries suffer a lack of freedom of speech, that undermine the film industry. This is specially severe in Equatorial Guinea. The feature film The Writer From a Country Without Bookstores is the first to be shot in the country and critic with Teodoro Obiang Nguema Mbasogo's dictatorship, one of the longest lasting in the world.

In 2025, Angola premiered its first musical film, still one of the few to be shot in Africa. Called "The Adventures of Angosat", contains music composed by local rapper Isis Hembe.

=== Themes ===
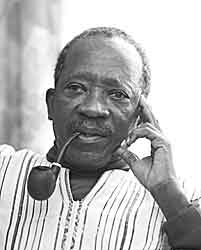
Senegalese film director, producer and write Ousmane Sembène (1923–2007)

African cinema, like cinema in other world regions, covers a wide variety of topics. In Algiers in 1975, the Pan African Federation of Filmmakers (FEPACI) adopted the Charte du cinéaste africain (Charter of the African cinéaste), which recognized the importance of postcolonial and neocolonial realities in African cinema. The filmmakers start by recalling the neocolonial condition of African societies. "The situation contemporary African societies live in is one in which they are dominated on several levels: politically, economically and culturally." African filmmakers stressed their solidarity with progressive filmmakers in other parts of the world. African cinema is often seen a part of Third Cinema.

Some African filmmakers, for example Ousmane Sembène, try to give African history back to African people by remembering the resistance to European and Islamic domination.

The African filmmaker is often compared to the traditional griot. Like griots, filmmakers' task is to express and reflect communal experiences. Patterns of African oral literature often recur in African films. African film has also been influenced by traditions from other continents, such as Italian neorealism, Brazilian Cinema Novo and the theatre of Bertolt Brecht.

== Women directors ==
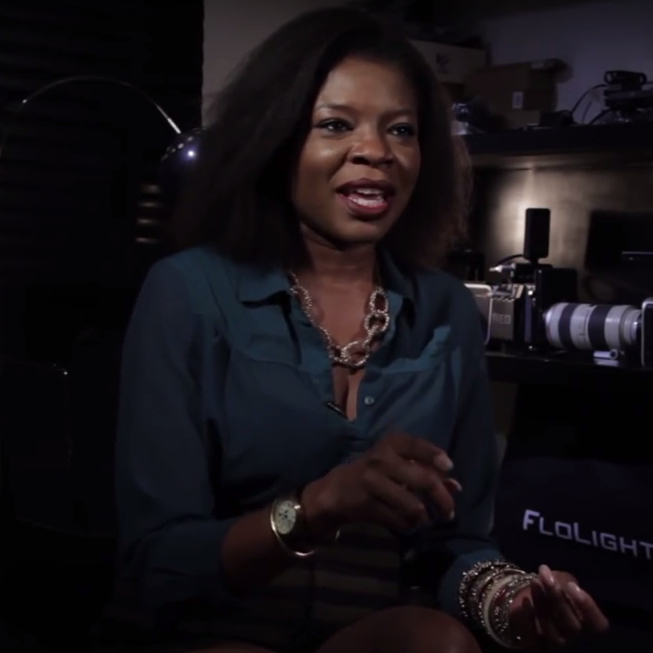
Kemi Adetiba (born 1980), Nigerian film maker, 2014

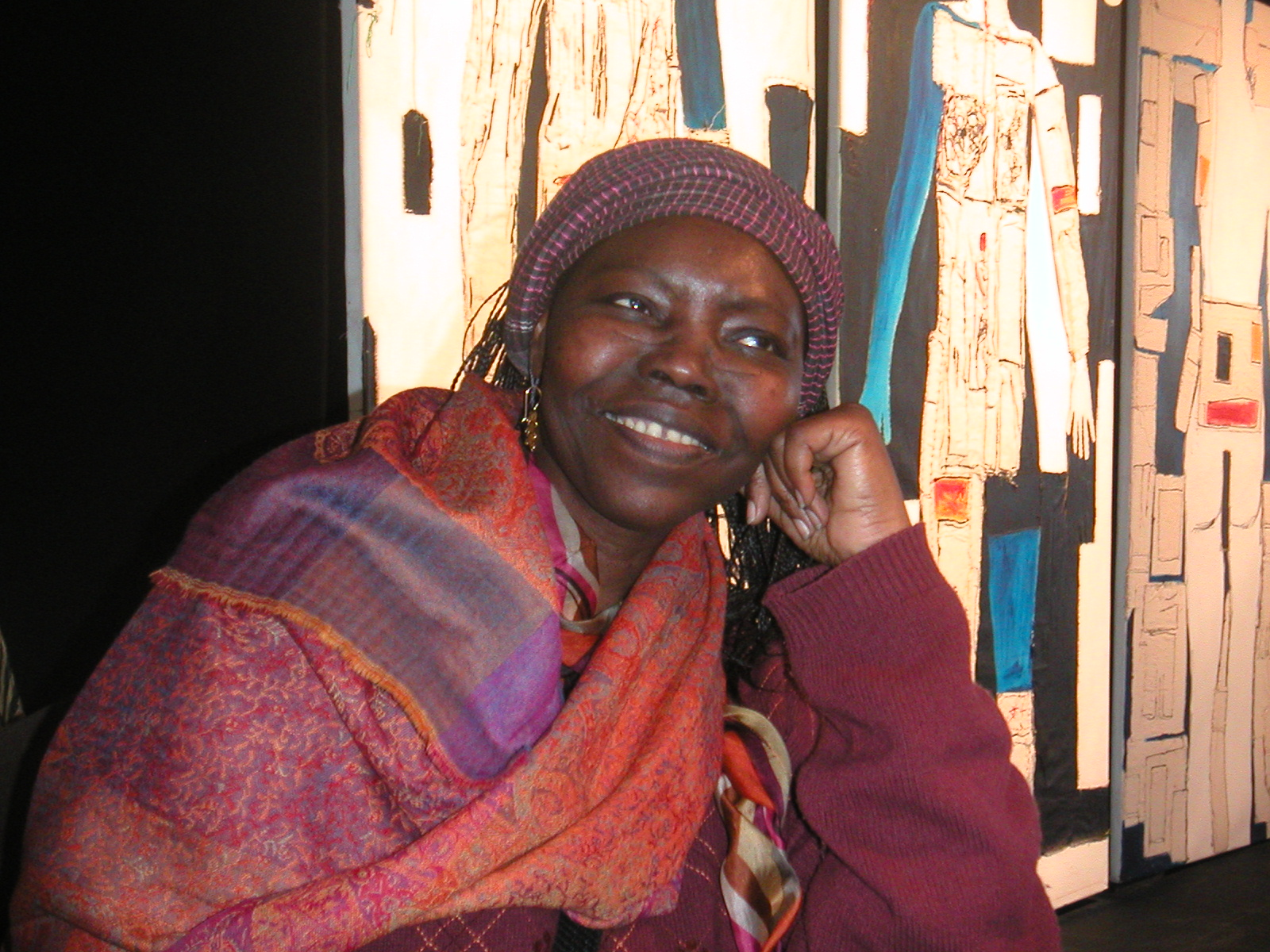
Safi Faye (1943–2023), Senegalese film director, anthropologist, ethnologist and feminist, 2004

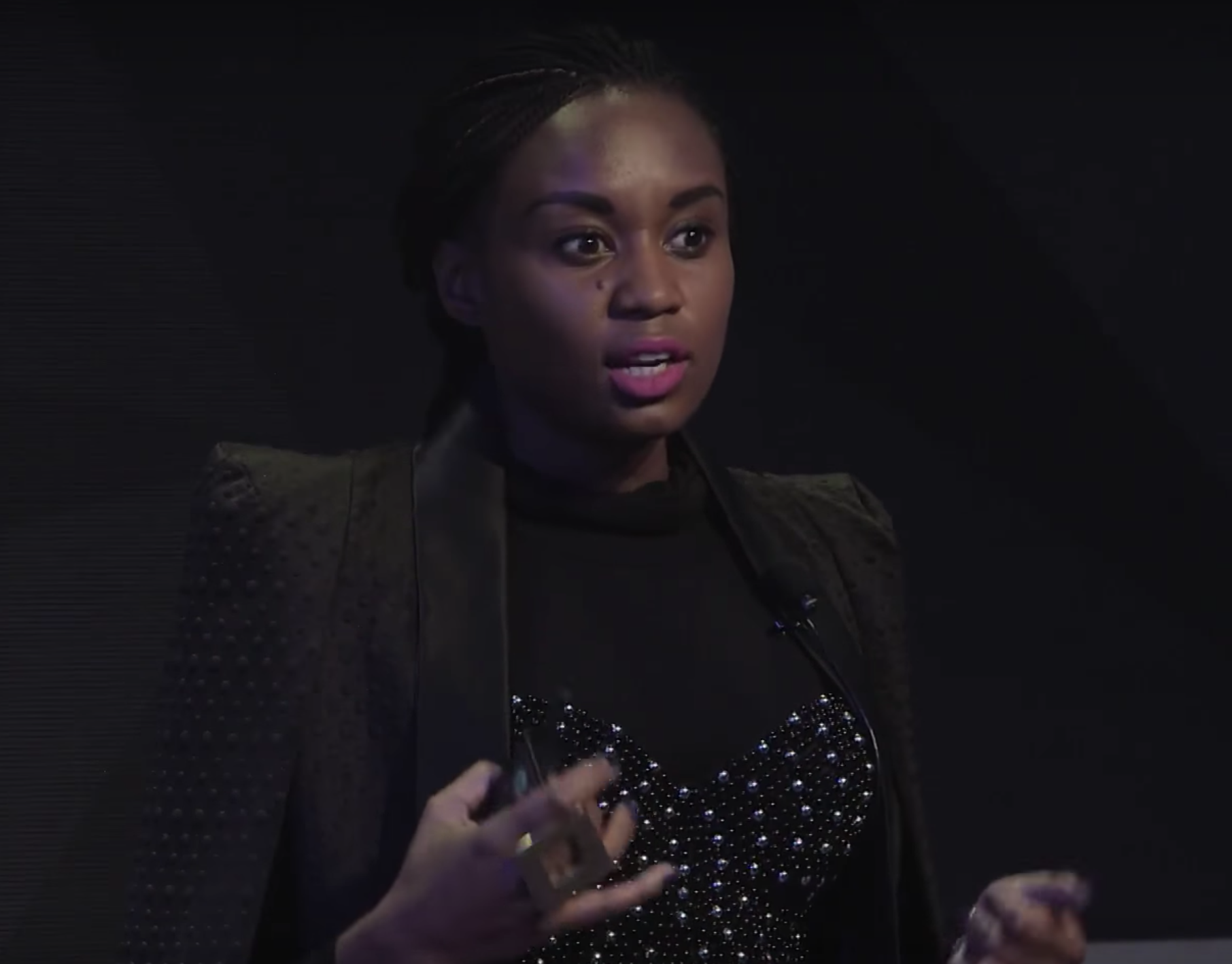
Wanuri Kahiu (born 1980), Kenyan film director, producer, and author, 2018

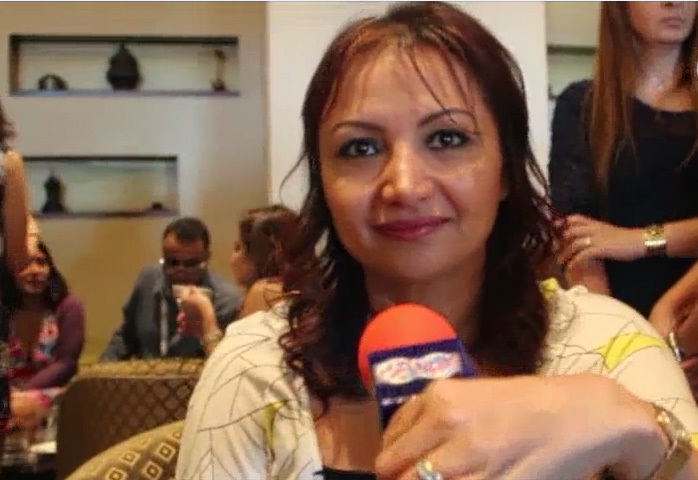
Hala Khalil (born 1967), Egyptian film director, producer, and screenwriter, 2018

Recognised as one of the pioneers of Senegalese cinema as well as cinema developed on the African continent at large, ethnologist and filmmaker Safi Faye was the first African woman film director to gain international recognition. Faye's first film La Passante (The Passerby) was released in 1972 and following this, Kaddu Beykat (Letter from My Village), the filmmaker's first feature film was released in 1975. Faye continued to be active with several released works in the latter half of the 1970s all the way through her latest work, the 1996 drama film Mossane.

Sarah Maldoror, a French filmmaker and the daughter of immigrants from Guadeloupe has been recognised as one of the pioneers of African cinema in the diaspora. She is the founder of Les Griots (The Troubadours), the first drama company in France made for actors of African and Afro-Caribbean descent. Originally in the theatre, she went on to study filmmaking at the State Institute of Cinematography of the Russian Federation (VGIK) in Moscow. In 1972, Maldoror shot her film Sambizanga about the 1961–74 war in Angola. Surviving African women of this war are the subject of the documentary Les Oubliées (The forgotten women), made by Anne-Laure Folly 20 years later. Maldoror also worked as assistant director on The Battle of Algiers (1966) with filmmaker Gillo Pontecorvo.

In 1995, Wanjiru Kinyanjui made the feature film The Battle of the Sacred Tree in Kenya.

In 2008, Manouchka Kelly Labouba became the first woman in the history of Gabonese cinema to direct a fictional film. Her short film Le Divorce addresses the impact of modern and traditional values on the divorce of a young Gabonese couple.

Kemi Adetiba, hitherto a music video director, made her directorial debut in 2016 with The Wedding Party. The film, about the events involved in the celebration of an aristocratic wedding, would go on to become the most successful Nollywood film in the history of her native Nigeria.

Wanuri Kahiu is a Kenyan film director, best known for her film From a Whisper, which was awarded Best Director, Best Screenplay, and Best Picture at the Africa Movie Academy Awards in 2009. Nearly 10 years after the release of From a Whisper, Kahiu's film Rafiki, a coming-of-age romantic drama about two teenage girls in the present-day Kenya. The film made headlines, partly for its selection at the Cannes Film Festival but also for its exploration of sexuality that did not sit well with the Kenyan government.

Rungano Nyoni, best known for the internationally acclaimed feature film I am Not a Witch is a Zambian-Welsh director and screenwriter. Born in Zambia and also raised in Wales, Nyoni went on to graduate from the University of Arts in London with a Master's in acting in 2009. Her filmography as a filmmaker (whether as a director or screenwriter) also includes the short films: The List (2009, short), Mwansa The Great (2011, short), Listen (2014, short), and she was also one of the directors of the international film project Nordic Factory (2014). She has been awarded a variety of awards including a BAFTA for outstanding debut by a British filmmaker for I am Not a Witch.

== UNESCO report on the African film industry ==
In October 2021, UNESCO published a report of the film and audiovisual industry in 54 states of the African continent including quantitative and qualitative data and an analysis of their strengths and weaknesses at the continental and regional levels. The report proposes strategic recommendations for the development of the film and audiovisual sectors in Africa and invites policymakers, professional organizations, firms, filmmakers and artists to implement them in a concerted manner.

Part 1 of the report is titled Pan-African Trends Shaping the Future of the Continent's Film and Audiovisual Sector, Part 2 is Strategic Development and Growth Models, Part 3 presents detailed national mappings of the countries, and an annex lists historical key dates in African cinema from 1896 to 2021. Apart from the historical developments of audiovisual productions, major filmmakers and their artistic merit and recent trends, such as online streaming, as well as the lack of training, funding, and appreciation of this industry, are discussed.

== List of cinema by region ==
=== North Africa ===
- Cinema of Algeria
- Cinema of Egypt
- Cinema of Libya
- Cinema of Morocco
- Cinema of Tunisia

=== West Africa ===
- Cinema of Benin
- Cinema of Burkina Faso
- Cinema of Cape Verde
- Cinema of the Gambia
- Cinema of Ghana
- Cinema of Guinea
- Cinema of Guinea-Bissau
- Cinema of Ivory Coast
- Cinema of Liberia
- Cinema of Mali
- Cinema of Mauritania
- Cinema of Niger
- Cinema of Nigeria
- Cinema of Senegal
- Cinema of Sierra Leone
- Cinema of Togo

=== Central Africa ===
- Cinema of Angola
- Cinema of Burundi
- Cinema of Cameroon
- Cinema of the Central African Republic
- Cinema of Chad
- Cinema of the Democratic Republic of the Congo
- Cinema of Equatorial Guinea
- Cinema of Gabon
- Cinema of the Republic of the Congo
- Cinema of Rwanda
- Cinema of São Tomé and Príncipe

=== East Africa ===
- Cinema of the Comoros
- Cinema of Djibouti
- Cinema of Eritrea
- Cinema of Ethiopia
- Cinema of Kenya
- Cinema of Mauritius
- Cinema of Seychelles
- Cinema of Somalia
- Cinema of South Sudan
- Cinema of Sudan
- Cinema of Tanzania
- Cinema of Uganda

=== Southern Africa ===
- Cinema of Botswana
- Cinema of Eswatini
- Cinema of Lesotho
- Cinema of Madagascar
- Cinema of Malawi
- Cinema of Mozambique
- Cinema of Namibia
- Cinema of South Africa
- Cinema of Zambia
- Cinema of Zimbabwe

== Directors by country ==
- Algeria: Merzak Allouache, Malek Bensmaïl, Nina Khada, Karim Moussaoui
- Angola: Zézé Gamboa, Miguel Hurst
- Benin: Idrissou Mora Kpaï, Jean Odoutan
- Botswana: Thabiso Maretlwaneng, Thato Rantao Mwosa
- Burkina Faso: Gaston Kaboré, Valérie Kaboré, Dani Kouyaté, Fanta Régina Nacro, Sanou Kollo, Idrissa Ouedraogo, Pierre Rouamba, Drissa Touré, Apolline Traoré, Saint Pierre Yaméogo
- Burundi: Justine Bitagoye, Eddy Munyaneza, Léonce Ngabo
- Cameroon: Jean-Pierre Bekolo, Bassek Ba Kobhio, Urbain Dia Moukouri, Bernard Auguste Kouemo Yanghu, Joséphine Ndagnou, Jean-Paul Ngassa, Jean-Pierre Dikongué Pipa, Thérèse Sita-Bella, Francis Taptue, Jean-Marie Teno, Francois L. Woukoache
- Cape Verde: Lolo Arziki, Leão Lopes, Júlio Silvão Tavares
- Chad: Issa Serge Coelo, Mahamat Saleh Haroun
- Comoros: Hachimiya Ahamada
- Côte d'Ivoire: Marie-Louise Asseu, Sidiki Bakaba, Akissi Delta, Henri Duparc, Desiré Ecaré, Fadika Kramo Lanciné, Roger Gnoan M'Bala, Jacques Trabi
- Democratic Republic of the Congo: Machérie Ekwa Bahango, Balufu Bakupa-Kanyinda, Baloji, Mars Kadiombo Yamba Bilonda, Guy Bomanyama-Zandu, Claude Haffner, Dieudo Hamadi, Mamadi Indoka, Kiripi Katembo, Joseph Kumbela, Laura Kutika, Zeka Laplaine, Albert Mongita, Djo Tunda Wa Munga, Guy Kabeya Muya, Mwezé Ngangura, Ne Kunda Nlaba, Monique Mbeka Phoba, Roger Kwami Zinga
- Egypt: Salah Abu Seif, Adel Adeeb, Youssef Chahine, Yousry Nasrallah, Ezz El-Dine Zulficar, Sherif Arafa, Khaled Youssef, Marwan Hamed, Mohamed Khan, Shady Abdel Salam, Khairy Beshara, Samir Seif, Nader Galal, Ali Abdel-Khalek, Ashraf Fahmy, Radwan El-Kashef, Hady El Bagoury, Ali Ragab, Hala Khaleel, Ehab Lamey, Tarek Al Eryan, Atef El-Tayeb, Daoud Abdel Sayed, Ehab Mamdouh, Sandra Nashaat
- Ethiopia: Yemane Demissie, Haile Gerima, Hermon Hailay, Salem Mekuria
- Gabon: Henri Joseph Koumba Bibidi, Pierre-Marie Dong, Imunga Ivanga, Manouchka Kelly Labouba, Charles Mensah
- Ghana: Egbert Adjesu, John Akomfrah, King Ampaw, Kwaw Ansah, Jim Awindor, Yaba Badoe, Akosua Busia, Leila Djansi, Kuukua Eshun, Shirley Frimpong-Manso, Chris Hesse, Nii Kwate Owoo, Kwesi Owusu, Tom Ribeiro, Halaru B. Wandagou
- Guinea: David Achkar, Sékoumar Barry, Cheick Fantamady Camara, Mohamed Camara, Cheik Doukouré, Gahité Fofana, Mama Keïta
- Guinea-Bissau: Flora Gomes, Sana Na N'Hada
- Kenya: Robby Bresson,Jim Chuchu, Wanuri Kahiu, Wanjiru Kinyanjui, Judy Kibinge, Gilbert Lukalia, Jane Munene, Anne Mungai
- Lesotho: Lemohang Jeremiah Mosese
- Madagascar: Alexander Abela, Marie-Clémence Andriamonta-Paes, Lova Nantenaina, Philippe Raberojo, Raymond Rajaonarivelo, Benoît Ramampy, Solo Randrasana, Luck Razanajaona, Laza Razanajatovo
- Mali: Abdoulaye Ascofare, Souleymane Cissé, Cheick Oumar Sissoko, Manthia Diawara, Adama Drabo
- Mauritania: Med Hondo, Abderrahmane Sissako, Sidney Sokhona
- Mozambique: Fátima Albuquerque, Licínio Azevedo, Karen Boswall, Sol de Carvalho, Camilo de Sousa, Mickey Fonseca, Rogério Manjate, Isabel Noronha, Lara Sousa
- Namibia: Joel Haikali, Tim Huebschle, Richard Pakleppa
- Niger: Moustapha Alassane, Oumarou Ganda
- Nigeria: Femi Adebayo, Kemi Adetiba, C.J. Obasi, Kunle Afolayan, Dele Ajakaiye, Andy Amenechi, Bayo Awala, Ola Balogun, Biyi Bandele, Jide Bello, Chico Ejiro, Zeb Ejiro, Obi Emelonye, Lola Fani-Kayode, Greg Fiberesima, Amaka Igwe, Tunde Kelani, Billy Kings, Chris Obi Rapu, Tade Ogidan, Iyabo Ojo, Izu Ojukwu, Zina Saro-Wiwa, Yemi Shodimu, Eddie Ugboma
- Rwanda: Eric Kabera, Kivu Ruhorahoza
- São Tomé and Príncipe: Januário Afonso, Katya Aragão, Ângelo Torres
- Senegal: Tidiane Aw, Moussa Bathily, Ben Diogaye Bèye, Ahmadou Diallo, Clarence Thomas Delgado, Djibril Diop Mambéty, Thierno Faty Sow, Safi Faye, Joseph Gaï Ramaka, Dyana Gaye, Alain Gomis, Ousmane William Mbaye, Bouna Medoune Seye, Samba Félix Ndiaye, Moustapha Ndoye, Ababacar Samb Makharam, Ibrahima Sarr, Ousmane Sembène, Moussa Sène Absa, Blaise Senghor, Mansour Sora Wade, Paulin Soumanou Vieyra, As Thiam, Momar Thiam, Moussa Touré, Mahama Johnson Traoré
- Somalia: Abdisalam Aato, Abdulkadir Ahmed Said, Idil Ibrahim
- Sudan: Amjad Abu Alala, Suhaib Gasmelbari, Gadalla Gubara, Hajooj Kuka, Hussein Shariffe, Marwa Zein
- South Africa: Neill Blomkamp, Seipati Bulani-Hopa, Mickey Dube, Nosipho Dumisa, Oliver Hermanus, Katinka Heyns, Gavin Hood, William Kentridge, Jonathan Liebesman, Nana Mahomo, Zola Maseko, Teddy Matthera, Morabane Modise, Sechaba Morejele, Lionel Ngakane
- Togo: Anne Laure Folly
- Tunisia: Raja Amari, Mehdi Ben Attia, Mohamed Ben Attia, Kaouther Ben Hania, Férid Boughedir, Leyla Bouzid, Nouri Bouzid, Khaled Ghorbal, Nacer Khémir, Anis Lassoued, Moufida Tlatli
- Uganda: Matt Bish, Caroline Kamya, Hassan Kamoga, Usama Mukwaya, Mariam Ndagire, George Stanley Nsamba, Joseph Kenneth Ssebaggala,
- Zambia: Rungano Nyoni
- Zimbabwe: M. K. Asante Jr., Tsitsi Dangarembga, Roger Hawkins, Siphiwe Gloria Ndlovu, Jordan Riber

== Films about African cinema ==
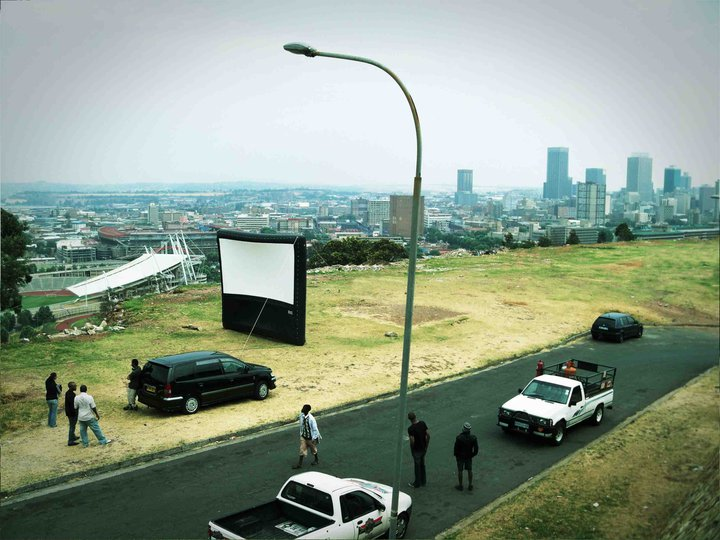
An Open-Air-Cinema in Johannesburg with an inflatable movie screen (2010)

- Caméra d'Afrique, Director: Férid Boughedir, Tunisia/France, 1983
- La Belle at the Movies, Director: Cecilia Zoppelletto, Kinshasa, 2016
- Le Congo, quel cinéma!, Director: Guy Bomanyama-Zandu, Democratic Republic of Congo, 2005
- Les Fespakistes, Directors: François Kotlarski, Eric Münch, Burkina Faso/France, 2001
- Sembene!, Director: Samba Gadjigo and Jason Silverman, 2015
- Spell Reel, Director: Filipa César, Guinea-Bissau, 2017, documentary on the digitization of revolutionary films from Guinea-Bissau.
- This Is Nollywood, Director: Franco Sacchi, 2007

== Film festivals ==
=== Africa ===
- Africa International Film Festival (AFRIFF), Lagos, Nigeria
- Africa Movie Academy Awards (AMAA, AMA Awards), Yenagoa, Nigeria
- Alexandria Mediterranean Countries Film Festival, Alexandria, Egypt
- Amakula International Film Festival, Kampala, Uganda
- Ananse Cinema International Film Festival (ANCIFF), Kasoa, Ghana
- Aswan International Women's Film Festival, Aswan, Egypt
- Bushman Film Festival, held in Abidjan, Côte d'Ivoire
- Cabo Verde International Film Festival
- Cairo International Film Festival (CIFF), Cairo, Egypt
- Carthage Film Festival
- El Gouna Film Festival (GFF), El Gouna, Egypt
- Festival International du Film Amateur de Kélibia (FIFAK), Kélibia, Tunisia
- Panafrican Film and Television Festival of Ouagadougou (FESPACO), Burkina Faso
- Festival of African Cinema (Tarifa-Tangier African Film Festival), Morocco/Spain
- Luanda International Pan African Film Festival (Luanda PAFF)
- Luxor African Film Festival, Luxor, Egypt
- Panafrican Film and Television Festival of Ouagadougou (FESPACO) is the largest and most prestigious film festival in Africa
- Rencontres du Film Court Madagascar (Madagascourt Film Festival)
- Rwanda Film Festival (Hillywood), held in Rwanda
- Sahara International Film Festival (FiSahara), held in Sahrawi refugee camps in Algeria
- Zanzibar International Film Festival (ZIFF)

=== Asia ===
- Atesib Film Festival, Israel

=== Europe ===
- Africa in Motion, held in Edinburgh, Scotland in late October
- Festival cinémas d’Afrique Lausanne, in Lausanne, Switzerland in August
- Festival des Cinémas d'Afrique du pays d'Apt, in Apt, Vaucluse, France in November

=== USA ===
- The African Film Festival (TAFF) held in Dallas in late June
- African Film Festival, held in New York
- Africa World Documentary Film Festival, held in St Louis
- Pan African Film Festival, held in Los Angeles
- Silicon Valley African Film Festival, held in San Jose, California

== See also ==
- African literature
- Africa Movie Academy Awards, Nigeria
- Atlas Corporation Studios, Morocco
- List of African films
- Négritude
- Negrophilia
- Nu Metro Cinemas, South Africa
- Political cinema
- Somaliwood, Somali film industry, Ohio, USA
- Ster-Kinekor, South Africa
- Third Cinema, includes filmmakers from Africa
- Women in African cinema
- World cinema

== Sources ==
This article incorporates text from a free content work. Licensed under CC-BY-SA 3.0 IGO. Text taken from The African film industry. Trends, challenges and opportunities for growth, UNESCO.

== Bibliography ==
- "Africultures, les mondes en relation". africultures.com (in French, English, and Portuguese). Africultures. 2023.
- "Afrimages, Cinémas d'Afrique: analyses critiques". afrimages.net (in French, English, and Portuguese). Afrimages, Olivier Barlet. 2023.
- "Africine.org, Le leader mondial (cinémas africains & diaspora)". africine.org (in French, English, and Portuguese). Fédération africaine de la critique cinématographique (FACC), African Federation of Film Critics. 2023. "Actuellement recensés 21 791 films, 2 562 textes"
- Armes, Roy: Dictionary of African Filmmakers, Indiana University Press, 2008, ISBN 0-253-35116-2
- Barlet, Olivier (2000). African Cinemas: Decolonizing the Gaze. London; New York: Zed Books. ISBN 978-1856497428.
- Barlet, Olivier (15 July 2008). "The Five Decades of African Cinemas". Africultures.
- Barlet, Olivier (2016). Contemporary African Cinema. East Lansing: Michigan State University Press. ISBN 978-1611862119.
- de Medeiros, Paulo; Apa, Livia, eds. (2021). Contemporary Lusophone African film : transnational communities and alternative modernities. Remapping world cinema. Abingdon, Oxon: Routledge. ISBN 9780367134976.
- Dovey, Lindiwe (2009). African Film and Literature: Adapting Violence to the Screen. Columbia University Press. ISBN 978-0231147545.
- Friendéthié, Martial K. (2009). Francophone African cinema : history, culture, politics and theory. Jefferson, N.C.: McFarland. ISBN 9780786439621. OCLC 277136408.
- "Ecrans d'Afrique, Revue internationale de cinéma, télévision et vidéo". africine.org. "Créée en 1992. Elle n'est plus éditée depuis 1998.". See also Ecrans d'Afrique.
- Halhoul, Khalid (2012-07-03). "Using African Cinema to Shift Cultural Perceptions". Utne Reader.
- Harrow, Kenneth W.; Garritano, Carmela, eds. (2019). A companion to African cinema. Wiley-Blackwell companions to national cinemas. Hoboken, NJ: John Wiley & Sons, Inc. p. 498. ISBN 9781119100317.
- Lelievre, Samuel (ed.), "Cinémas africains, une oasis dans le désert?", CinémAction, no. 106, Paris, Télérama/Corlet, 1st trimester 2003
- Okome, Onookome. "Film Policy and the development of the African Cinema" (PDF) – via Michigan State University.
- Ouzgane, Lahoucine (2011). Men in African film & fiction. Woodbridge, Suffolk, UK: James Currey imprint of Boydell & Brewer. ISBN 9781846159329. OCLC 792684913.
- Pfaff, Françoise (2004). Focus on African Films. Bloomington: Indiana University Press. ISBN 9780253216687.
- Roberts, Andrew D. (1987). "Africa on Film to 1940". History in Africa. 14: 189–227. doi:10.2307/3171838. ISSN 0361-5413.
- Solanas, Fernando E., Getino, Octavio, "Towards a Third Cinema" in: Bill Nichols (ed.), Movies and Methods. An Anthology, University of California Press, 1976, pp. 44–64
- Şaul, Mahir and Ralph Austen, Ralph A. (eds), Viewing African Cinema in the Twenty-First Century: Art Films and the Nollywood Video Revolution, Ohio University Press, 2010, ISBN 978-0-8214-1931-1
- Tomaselli, Keyan G., & Mhando, Martin (eds), Journal of African Cinemas, Bristol : Intellect, 2009 -, ISSN 1754-9221
- Ukadike, Nwachukwu Frank (1994). Black African cinema. Berkeley, CA: University of California Press. ISBN 978-0520077478.*Ukadike, Nwachukwu Frank (1994). Black African cinema. Berkeley, CA: University of California Press. ISBN 978-0520077478.
