= Women in African cinema =

Women are involved in the African film industry in a variety of roles, though they have been underrepresented in creative positions.

== Background ==
During the colonial era Africa was exclusively represented exclusively by Western filmmakers, which resulted in portrayals of Africa and African people as "exoticized", "submissive workers" or as "savage or cannibalistic". The African independence movements that rose out of the 1950s and 1960s resulted in cinema that aimed to use the camera as a tool to counter these colonial portrayals. Women were active in the African film industry prior to and during this time, however their roles were predominantly limited to supportive positions such as acting. The emergence of women into other roles in the film industry during this period coincided with a collective assembly of film professionals that desired to promote African cinema. These film professionals, several of whom were women, began to establish organizations and festivals geared towards the cultivation and recognition of African films such as the Panafrican Film and Television Festival of Ouagadougou (FESPACO) and the Pan African Federation of Filmmakers (FEPACI), both created in 1969/70. The World Festival of Black Arts, a month-long culture and arts festival, also emerged during this time period and highlighted literature, fine arts, music, cinema, theatre, fashion, architecture, design, and dance from creators from the African Diaspora, particularly from filmmakers in the United States.

During the 1970s there was a global call to action in various spheres of the lives of women with the evolution of universal women's rights movement, the development of second-wave feminism, the emergence of the Senegal-based bilingual feminist research group the Association of African Women for Research and Development (AAWORD), and the declaration of the United Nations Decade of Women from 1976 to 1985, all of which drastically influenced the development and analysis of women's academic studies, feminist film theory, and the visual representation of women, globally. These movements have been credited by scholars as having engendered an understanding of universal sisterhood, from which emerged a flurry of conferences and media that reflected the diverse experience of women internationally.

== Women directors ==
Africans were limited in what roles they could take in film until the 1950s and 60s, when indigenous Africans began freeing themselves from colonial rule, however few women were given access to the creative process beyond acting. Director Safi Faye is credited as the first African woman to direct a film with the release of her 1975 film Kaddu Beykat, which film scholar N. Frank Ukadike has stated is indicative of wider struggles by black filmmakers in the African diaspora. Filmmaker and author Tsitsi Dangarembga has cited patriarchal biases in the film industry and African society as reasons, why African women in particular struggle as filmmakers. Scholar Nancy Schmidt has further noted that up to 1997, there were only recently online platforms, publications, filmographies or bibliographies that acknowledged all the feature films, documentaries, shorts and works in video, television, and digital media that African women have directed over the past several decades.

Non-profit organizations have been formed to help address these issues and promote African women in film and television, such as the Ladima Foundation, (Dada Trust) and woman-centred film festivals such as the International Images Film Festival for Women and (Udada International Women's Film Festival) have been launched. Examples of online resources on African women in cinema include Beti Ellerson's Centre for the Study and Research of African Women in Cinema, which launched in 2008 and manages the blog African Women in Cinema.

Some directors such as Sarah Maldoror have experienced difficulty receiving recognition as an African film director, resulting in exclusion from lists of African filmmakers, while their films are discussed in studies on African cinema. Paulin Soumanou Vieyra has cited citizenship as a major component on identification as an African film director, stating that films directed by non-citizens about Africa are "of African inspiration/film d'inspiration africaine", which scholar Alexie Tcheuyap argues "would automatically disqualify directors like Sarah Maldoror or Raoul Peck, who are too often, almost intuitively, considered 'African.'" Some scholars, such as art historian Beatriz Leal Riesco have noted that Maldoror is "African with respect to her motivation and themes"

== History of women in African film ==
=== 1960s and 1970s ===
During the colonial era, cultures and laws such as the 1934 Laval Decree, that governed French colonies, prohibited Africans from making their own films, which has been credited as stunting the growth of film as a means of African expression, political, cultural, and artistic. As Africa emerged as a postcolonial world region, Africans began creating their own films and women took on more prominent roles, while still being largely limited to acting roles only. Despite the apparent defeat of colonialism, however, certain conservative notions of European civilization lingered, finding an echo in a form of village traditionalism and patriarchal authoritarianism, with Kenneth W. Harrow stating that "Whereas the protests of the 1950s and 1960s were directed against European colonialists as outsiders, or against Europe itself as an outside force, now they were directed internally against African figures of authority, – oppressive, domineering figures, including those who fled the nation and the economy as well as those who governed villages or families." He argued that even if the colonial overlord has been removed, similar mechanisms of conquest are therefore repeated on the body of the African woman in 1960s and 1970s film.

Films made during this era that featured or were created by African women directors featured themes of sexual impression that included polygamy, conflict between modern romance and traditions of arranged marriages, the marginalization of widows and single women, and female genital mutilation. Scholars such as Sheila Petty have argued that they should not only be read as portraying an unshakeable patriarchy, but as expressions of a general loss of identity, with extreme examples of sexual politics functioning as a "process in which cultural roles can be modified through affective partnerships between men and women."

In 1975 Safi Faye released Kaddu Beykat, which is widely considered to be the first feature film to be commercially released that was directed by an African woman. She had previously released a short film, "La Passante", about three years prior in 1972. She is also credited as being the first African woman film director to gain international recognition, as Kaddu Beykat won several awards among which is the FIPRESCI Prize. Other films that were released during this time period include Maldoror's 1972 film Sambizanga.

=== Women in 1980s and 1990s Cinema ===
Per Harrow, African women filmmakers became prolific during the 1980s and 1990s, "finally providing us with something more significant than Sembene's images of long-oppressed wives or daughters" and that "Perhaps the best way to understand post-engagement cinema is as that of a cinema that has begun to turn in the direction of women as harbingers for Africa's future." Woman centric films were traditionally less essentialist and less about double repression by African patriarchal culture and Western colonising forces.

== Themes ==
Themes are a common element in cinema and the cinema of Africa often covers colonialism and its aftermath, among other topics and events that have impacted life in Africa. Films that feature or are directed by African women may contain themes such as eroticism, African feminism, objectification, or arranged marriage and polygamy. Other themes can include resilience and female independence, as in the case of Cameroon filmmaker Rosine Mbakam's Chez Jolie Coiffure. Some themes, such as education, health, childhood, or the fight for equality, are seen as traditionally feminine per Beatriz Leal Riesco, but are subjected to "the perennial authoritarian gaze, the cardinal characteristic of which is the erection of a hermetic symbolic order codifying the distance between the creator and the reality represented".

=== Representation of women in African cinema ===
The representation of women in African cinema is seen as a common theme among women directors, such as Safi Faye and Sarah Maldoror. Historians have noted that women have made the bulk of the theme's research. Some films, such as Karmen Geï and U-Carmen eKhayelitsha feature female protagonists, but have been criticized as "[representing] a departure from the situation of the contemporary woman in Africa" as the films identify women with music and the voice. Riesco has noted that while these films portray the idealization of the feminine, they also "offer a vibrant alternative to the previous wave of cinema, largely characterized by the exaltation of the rural, of traditions and their recuperation, and of a specific kind of narration, slow and measured, based in oral conventions in which silence and speech were equally stressed."

=== Eroticism and sexuality ===
N. Frank Ukadike has noted that African women are often "at best, sexual objects enveloped in a culture of male chauvinism; and, in the words of Ousmane Sembene, they are "still refused the right of speech." Some films, such as Ceddo and Sarraounia have been credited as dispelling assumptions that African women are "simply sexual objects or exotic clichés", which Ukadike has credited in part to colonialist and traditionalist assumptions.

On the theme of eroticism and sexuality, director François Pfaff has argued that African films are less exploitative, because they anticipate spectators to be religious, while Isabelle Boni-Claverie in Pour la Nuit treats sexuality as emblematic of freedom and choice. The film Puk Nini has been cited by Jyoti Mystri and Antje Schuhmann as a movie that reflects on the multiple roles women are expected to perform both professionally and domestically. According to the authors, it motivated many discussions that address how gender relations operate or how "tradition" might be a constructive factor in the relations. They state that in this film a wife seeks the assistance of her husband's sex worker mistress in order to learn varying methods of seduction and that it reflects on the dual roles of homemaker and professional workers that some women are expected to adopt, while men do not generally carry this same social expectation.

=== Feminism ===
Themes of feminism are present in films such as Faces of Women, which Ukadike states "[questions] Africa's cultural patrimony and the strategies of patriarchal subordination of women". Feminist films became popular in Kenyan films during the 1990s and continued to be popular as of 2017, resulting in many repeated feminist themes such as a female character escaping an early marriage by running away in films such as Price of a Daughter and Saikati, as well as Saikati's sequel. Kenneth W. Harrow wrote that African feminism includes some differences from Western feminism, in that "One would overturn the club; the other would join it" as African feminism is "more a concern over gender equality and social or economic justice" whereas European or Western feminism focuses on issues such as "the status of the subject, gender identity, gendered language, patriarchy and above all oppositionality predominate". He in turn also questions whether European feminism would be at odds with African feminist filmmakers and see them as "inadvertently sustaining a patriarchal order and thus subverting their own goals".

=== Exploitation and emancipation ===
In the 1960s, African feminism came out of the Third Cinema movement, which regarded film as a medium of social and political activism. Films by Sembene, Safi Faye, Sarah Maldoror and others used linear narratives in order to clearly convey the systematic exploitation of certain groups of women. Employing film to further emancipation, these films took part of a more general effort by film-makers of this period to assert independence and reclaim national identities from colonial rule. This close association with the struggle for independence meant a certain marginalization of the cause of women and the challenges specific to their struggle.

=== Women's health ===
Female health has been a theme in films such as Ousmane Sembene's Moolaade, which focuses on the topic of female genital mutilation, and which has been explained as a coming of age ritual in some parts of Africa. Feminists and practitioners have debated over how the practice is seen, with feminists stating that it is a violent kind of women's oppression, while proponents see it as a cultural perception of purification, and critics have argued whether or not Sembene subverts or upholds the status quo. The term "pornotroping", which describes, how myths surrounding the image of black women are imposed on their bodies via visual modes of representation, such as film, that effectively support the "Othering" of black womanhood, has been brought up in the discussion of Moolaade.

== Challenges ==
Common challenges faced by African women in film include sexual harassment and sexism, as well as the balance of work and life. Lucy Gebre-Egziabher has described African women filmmakers as "warrior; they face a lot of obstacles. [...] I remember seeing a picture of a Kenyan filmmaker [...], she had her baby behind her on her back as she was directing. That was a most powerful image, it has stayed with me. To me, that is an African woman filmmaker." Others, such as Kenyan director Wanjiru Kinyanjui, have cited issues with cooperation, once remarking in an interview that her basic problem in studying film at the Deutsche Film und Fernsehakademie in Berlin was to "get the Europeans to co-operate with 'an ignorant black woman.'"

Other problems faced by African women directors in the global conditions of filmmaking involve the divide between local and global expectations of African life and values. Benin documentary filmmaker Giovannia Atodjinou-Zinsou stated that there are problems with awareness of issues that impact African women, as "Women's expression hasn't taken the way it should" and that there is much silence surrounding issues and that it is not limited to only sexual abuse.

=== Sexual harassment and abuse ===
Several women directors have reported experiencing sexual harassment and abuse. According to a report by Deutsche Welle, the South African group 'Sisters Working in Film and Television' "found that just under two-thirds of the South African women they surveyed had been non-consensually coerced or touched at work."
