= Cecilia Zoppelletto =

Italian filmmaker

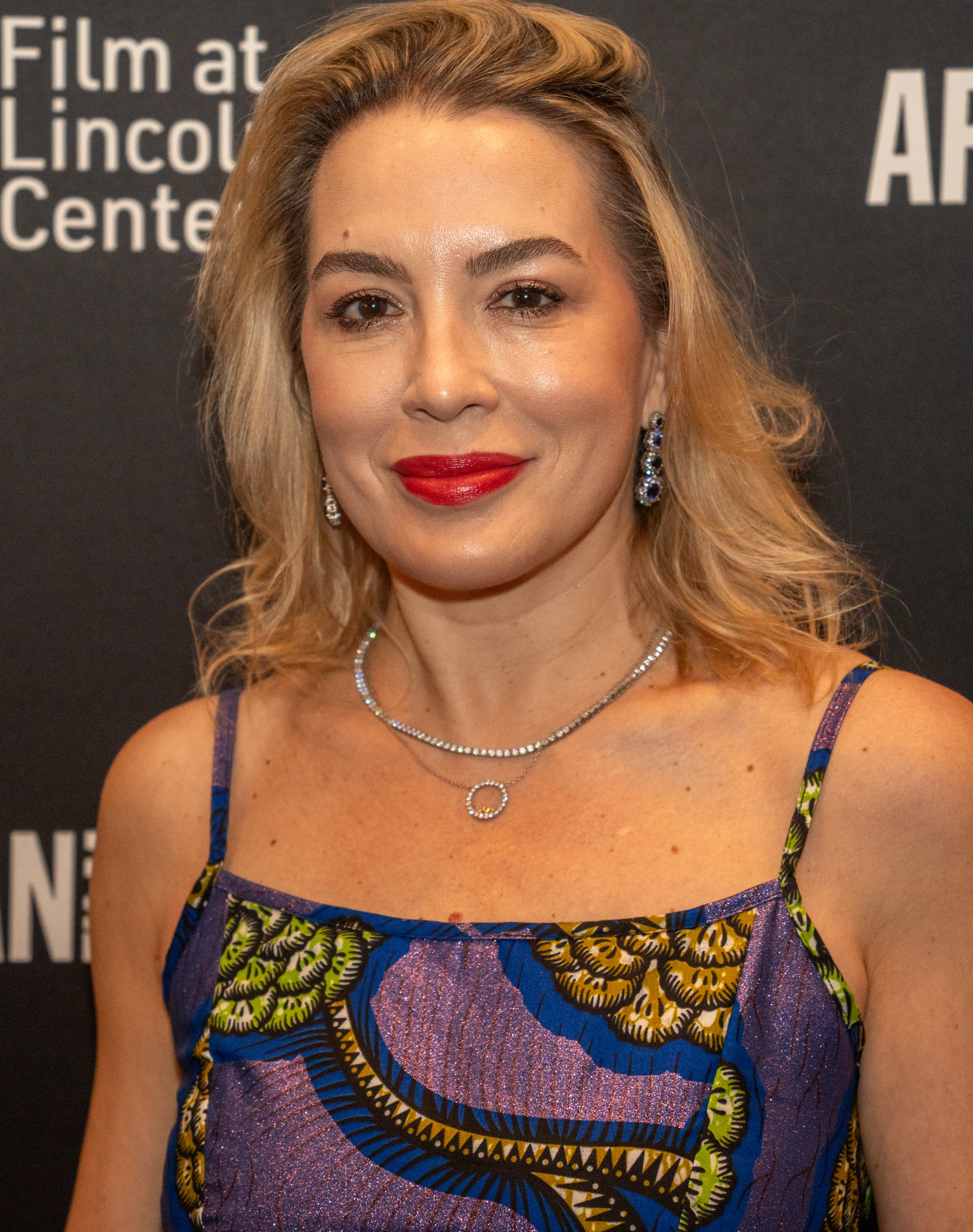
- Born: Cecilia Zoppelletto; Padua, Italy
- Occupations: Director, producer, screenwriter, lecturer
- Years active: 2014–present
- Spouse: Kalaa Mpinga (m.2018)

Cecilia Zoppelletto is an Italian filmmaker. She is best known as the director of the critically acclaimed Congolese documentary La Belle At The Movies.

== Personal life ==
Zoppelletto was born in Padua, Italy. Since 1994, she has been based in London. She holds a PhD in Film Studies from the University of Westminster. Since 2020, she has been teaching Film Studies in the Photography Department of the Académie des Beaux-Arts in Kinshasa, Democratic Republic of Congo.

== Career ==
As part of her research, Zoppelletto wrote Decolonisation through ‘Development Films’: Constructing and Re-Constructing the Zairian Spirit on Film, exploring the archives of the Democratic Republic of Congo and the country's national film image in the post-independence era.

She has worked as a news producer for the Italian broadcasting company RAI and as a TV host and writer for the Italian network 'Antenna Tre Nordest'. In 2015, she directed the documentary La Belle At The Movies, which received critical acclaim and was screened in the United States, Belgium, the United Kingdom, and the Democratic Republic of Congo. In 2017, she directed the experimental short film Falling, followed by the award-winning animated documentary short Ota Benga (2023) and the feature documentary AP Giannini: Bank to the Future (2023), co-written and co-directed with Valentina Signorelli, PhD.

Since 2024, Zoppelletto has serves as Vice-Chair of the Board of African Film Festival, Inc. (AFF), a non-profit cultural organization based in New York City that presents an annual film festival and year-round community programs.

In April 2026, Cecilia Zoppelletto was appointed Associate Professor at the Académie des Beaux-Arts in Kinshasa (founded in 1943), becoming the first woman to hold this position in the institution’s history. A PhD holder in Film Studies and a member of the Photography Department, her appointment marked a significant milestone for gender representation in higher arts education in the Democratic Republic of the Congo.

== Filmography ==
Year	Film	Role	Genre	Ref.
2016	La Belle at the Movies	Director, writer, producer	Documentary	
2017	Falling	Director, producer	Documentary short	
2023	Ota Benga	Director, producer	Documentary animation short	
2023	AP Giannini: Bank to the Future	Director, writer, producer	Documentary	
2025	Clichés	Director, writer, producer	Drama short	

== See also ==
- Cinema of Africa
