= Ecrans d'Afrique =

African filmmaking magazine

Ecrans d'Afrique Magazine
- Editor: Clement Tapsoba, Alessandra Speciale, Francoise Pfaff
- Categories: Film magazine
- Frequency: Quarterly
- Founded: 1992
- Final issue: 1998
- Country: Burkina Faso
- Language: English; French
- Website: Ecrans d'Afrique
- ISSN: 1240-2001
- OCLC: 28329902

Ecrans d'Afrique: Revue Internationale de Cinema Television et Video (English: African Screen) was a bilingual magazine published in English and French, focused on African cinema and film production, published from 1992 until 1998.

Ecrans d'Afrique: Revue Internationale de Cinema Television et Video was founded by African filmmakers in Burkina Faso in 1992 during a period of intense worldwide interest and commentary on African television and film, explored all aspects of African film production. It, along with its many contemporaries, sought to ameliorate an intellectual climate which suffered from a dearth of commentary on African film.

The magazine, which aimed to improve worldwide exposure and access to African films, was linked to the Panafrican Film and Television Festival of Ouagadougou (FESPACO), the continent's leading film festival, from its inception. It was published by Fédération panafricaine des cinéastes (Pan African Federation of Filmmakers or FEPACI) on a quarterly basis.

Burkinabé filmmaker Gaston Kaboré was director of publications. Notable staff included Clément Tapsoba, Alessandra Speciale, Francoise Pfaff, Mbye B. Cham, Baba Diop, William Tanifeani, Therese-Marie Deffontaines, Jean Servais Bakyono, Frank Ukadike, and Beti Ellerson.

It ceased publication in 1998.

Ecrans d'Afrique was lauded for its wide gaze, covering the whole of the African diaspora, and for its excellent coverage of Caribbean film developments.
