= Francois L. Woukoache =

Belgian-Cameroonian filmmaker

- Born: Francois L. Woukoache; February 26, 1966 (age 60); Yaoundé, Cameroon
- Occupations: Director, producer, screenwriter
- Years active: 1991–present

Francois L. Woukoache (born 16 February 1966), is a Belgian–Cameroonian filmmaker and screenwriter. He has made about twenty films and a series of children's stories and of several television programs.

== Personal life ==
He was born on 16 February 1966 in Yaoundé in a family with nine siblings. After secondary studies, he followed higher scientific studies. He studied at the National Institute of Performing Arts in Brussels (INSAS).

== Career ==
In 1991, he made his first documentary film, Melina. In 1995, he made the documentary Asientos which deals on the slave trade. The film was screened at several film festivals and critically acclaimed. Then he made the short The smoke in the eyes in 1997 in Brussels. In 1998, Woukoache directed the feature Fragments de vie. This controversial film described the stages an urban and noisy Africa, that of the bars and nightclubs of a city in Equatorial Africa. In the same year, he directed the film We no longer died which was based on life after the genocide in Rwanda.

Since 1998, he has been involved in training work and audiovisual productions in Rwanda. He later became a teacher at the School of Journalism and Communication at the National University of Rwanda. During this period, he supervised the making of the Rwanda's first two short fiction films in 1999: Kiberinka and Entre deux mondes. In 200, he made the documentary Nous ne Sommes Plus Morts. The film won Special Jury Mention at Zanzibar International Film Festival.

Between 2003 and 2005, he was the coordinator of the project Igicucu n'Urumuri project which was started as an introduction to cinema in Rwandan schools. In 2009, Woukoache directed the short film The lady of the 4 th floor. Between 2013 and 2016, he coordinated the project Faces of Life. Through the project, he trained Rwandan women to use the visual arts as a means of critical expression and social transformation. He later directed the film, Ntarabana.

== Filmography ==
Year	Film	Role	Genre	Ref.
1995	Asientos	Director, writer	Documentary	
1999	Fragments de vie	Director, writer, executive producer	Short	
2000	Bon appetit!	Actor	Short film	
2000	Nous ne sommes plus morts	Director	Documentary	

== See also ==
- Cinema of Africa
