= Albert Mongita =

Congolese comic book author (1916–1985)

Albert Likeke Mongita
- Born: 8 March 1916; Irebu, Équateur, Democratic Republic of Congo
- Died: 1985 (aged 68–69)
- Education: Joseph Institute
- Occupation: Actor Dramatist Painter Filmmaker Theatre director

Albert Likeke Mongita, also known as Mongita Likeke (1916–1985) was an actor, dramatist, painter, filmmaker and theatre director from the Democratic Republic of Congo. Mongita was "one of the leaders of the national theatre movement in the decades after World War II".

== Life ==
Albert Mongita was born on 8 March 1916 at Irebu in Belgian Congo. When he was one year old, he came to Léopoldville (now Kinshasa). After six years in primary school and two years in a professional school, he attended the middle school St. Joseph's Institute for five years. Staying on to teach for five more years, he left to work for the post administration. In 1949 he joined Radio Congo Belge as an editor and announcer.

After writing several sketches, he became interested in theatre. Mongita joined the Alumni Association of the Fathers of Scheuts (ADAPES) in Léopoldville in the early 1950s, later becoming its theatrical driving force. With André Scohy, Mongita organized several national popular theatre festivals, and tours to Léopoldville by foreign theatre groups. Mongito write several plays in French for his theatre group, La ligue folklorique congolaise. Soki Stanley was performed in Léopoldville in 1954, on the fiftieth anniversary of Henry Morton Stanley's death. Lifoco was performed before the Governor General, Léo Pétillon in 1955. Mongita's Lifoco troupe toured through rough Tshela (Mayumbe), Matadi, and Thysville in 1956.

At the start of the 1950s a Congolese cine-club was established in Léopoldville, and under Belgian instruction Mongita helped to shoot La Leçon de Cinéma (The Film Lesson) in 1951. Most of the club's Congolese members did not make films after independence, suggesting that their training had not been thorough, though Mongito did make one documentary in 1963. He also served as director of cultural affairs in the post-independence country and later as director of the national theater.

== Works ==
=== Plays ===
- Mangengenge, published in mimeographed form, 1956
- Soki Stanley, La Quinzaine, 1957
- Ngombe, published serially in Présence Congolaise, 1964

=== Films ===
- (with other students) La Leçon de Cinéma [The Film Lesson], 1951
- Tams-tams du Congo, 1963
