= Sidney Sokhona =

Mauritanian filmmaker and politician

- Born: 1952 (age 73–74)
- Occupations: filmmaker and politician
- Notable work: Nationalité: Immigré [Nationality: Immigration], 1975; Safrana ou le droit à la parole [Safrana, or The Right to Speak], 1977
- Awards: Prix Georges Sadoul; Prix spécial du jury (exaequo avec Sejnane, d’Abdellatif Ben Ammar, Tunisie)

Sidney Sokhona (born 1952) is a Mauritanian filmmaker and politician.

== Life ==
Sokhona shot his first feature film, Nationality: Immigration, from 1972 to 1975 as an immigrant in Paris. The film hybridised documentary and surreal fiction, with Sokhana himself playing the lead role of an immigrant living through a rent strike in the Rue Riquet.

Sokhona wrote on African cinema for Cahiers du Cinéma, arguing that "Africa was colonized, and so is its cinema", and that African film-makers were beginning "to draw up battle plans for [....] cinematic independence".

== Filmography ==
- Nationalité: Immigré [Nationality: Immigration], 1975
- Safrana ou le droit à la parole [Safrana, or The Right to Speak], 1977

== Festivals / Awards ==
1976 | 5ème FESPACO | Ouagadougou, Burkina Faso | www.fespaco.bf

- Prix spécial du jury (exaequo avec Sejnane, d’Abdellatif Ben Ammar, Tunisie)

1975 | Paris, France

- Prix Georges Sadoul
