= Sidet: Forced Exile =

1991 Ethiopian film

Forced Exile
- Directed by: Salem Mekuria
- Produced by: Salem Mekuria
- Release date: 1991
- Country: Ethiopia

Sidet: Forced Exile is a 1991 film directed and produced by Salem Mekuria.

== Plot ==
Three women who are refugees try to survive despite the challenges that each individual faces in their journey of life.
