= Joseph Gaï Ramaka =

Senegalese film director

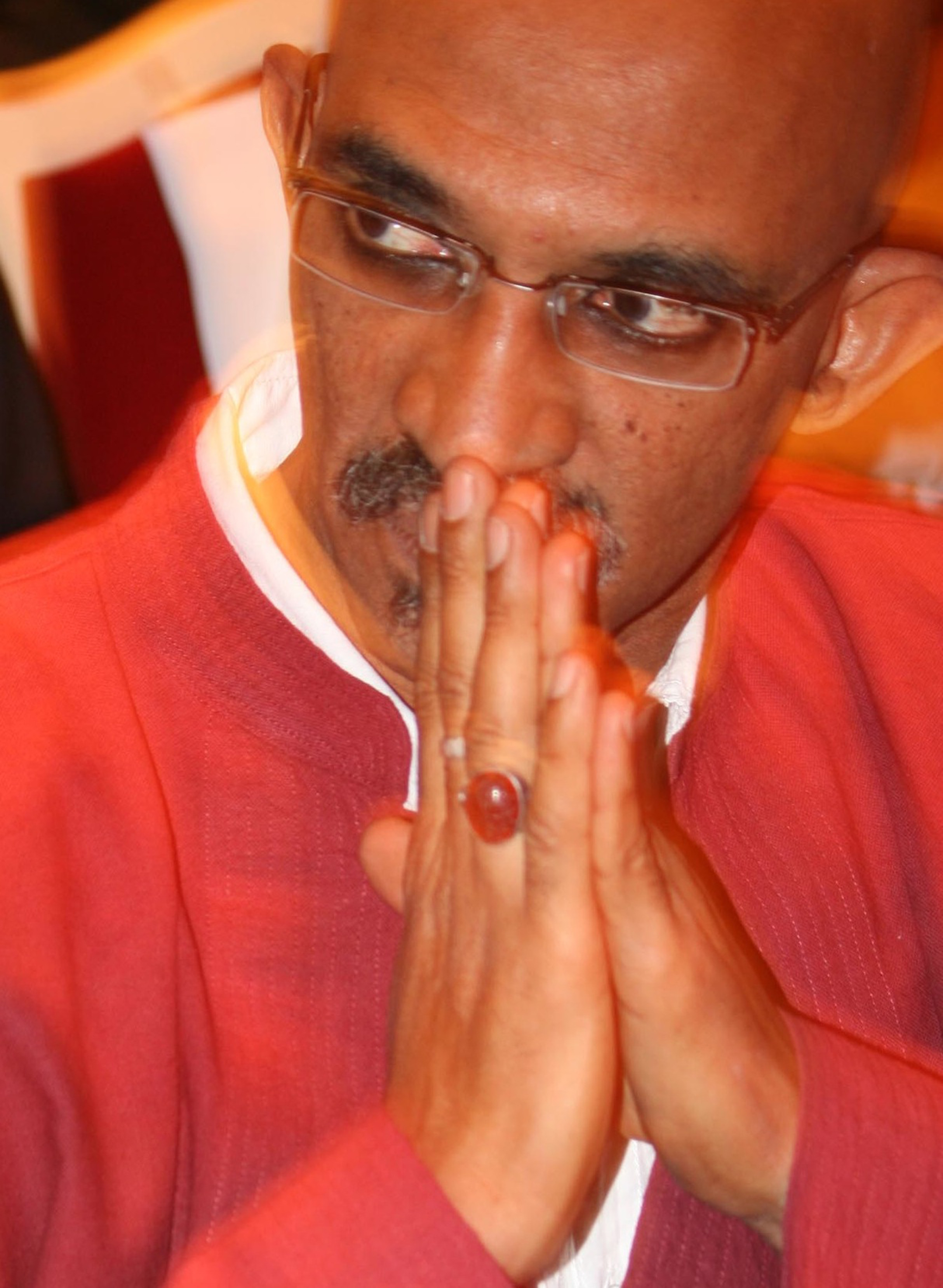
- Joseph Gaï Ramaka, 2010
- Born: 9 November 1952 (age 73); Saint-Louis, Senegal
- Occupations: film director, screen writer, film producer
- Known for: Ainsi soit-il ! (1997), Karmen Geï (2001), Et si Latif avait raison ! (2006)

Joseph Gaï Ramaka (Jo(e) Gaï Ramaka/Joseph Gaye Ramaka, born 9 November 1952 in Saint Louis, Senegal) is a Senegalese film director, screen writer and film producer.

== Biography ==
Gaï Ramaka studied visual anthropology at the Paris School for Advanced Studies in the Social Sciences and film studies at the Institut des hautes études cinématographiques (Institute for Advanced Cinematographic Studies, IDHEC). In 1990 he founded the French production and distribution company Les Ateliers de l’Arche. In 1999, the company established its Espace Bell’Arte branch in Dakar, Senegal, a screening facility with Dolby Stereo. The company's presence expanded with Arche Studios, a 15,000 square meter studio, and the first in West and Central Africa to have computerized lighting.

His feature-length films include Nitt... N'Doxx /Les Faiseurs de pluie, an adaptation of a story by Prosper Merimée, Karmen Geï (2000), an African version of the opera Carmen, and Et si Latif avait raison (And what if Latif were right!, 2006), a political documentary.

In 2007 he founded the New Orleans Afrikan Film and Arts Festival Project (NOAFEST) and in 2013, he created Gorée Island Cinema, a platform for collaborative cinematography, which has hosted the Gorée Cinema Festival since 2015.

Gaï Ramaka currently lives in New Orleans.

== Filmography ==
Gaï Ramaka's films include:

Year	Film	Genre	Role	Duration
1985	Baaw-Naan / Rites de pluie	Short, documentary	Screen writer, director	25 min (m)
1986	La Musique lyrique Peul	Short, documentary	Director	10 m
1986	Portrait d’un mannequin	Short, documentary	Director	10 m
1988	Niiwam by Clarence Thomas Delgado	Feature	Producer	88 m
1989	Nitt... N'Doxx / Les Faiseurs de pluie	Documentary	Screen writer, director	85 m
1991	Boxulmaleen !! (L'An fer) by William Ousmane Mbaye and Amet Diallo	Feature	Producer	30 m
1996	Idylle by Dominique Camara	Short, drama	Coproducer	14 m
1997	Ainsi soit-il ! (So Be It), episode of Africa Dreaming	Fiction	Screen writer, codirector, coproducer	33 m
1997	Baby Sister	Fiction pilot	Director	12 m
1998	Demain je brûle / Ghoudwa Nahrek by Mohamed Ben Smaïl	Drama	Producer	95 m
2001	Karmen Geï	Fiction, music	Screen writer, director	85 or 90 m
2006	Et si Latif avait raison ! (And what if Latif were right!)	Documentary	Screen writer, director, producer	95 m
2007	Jaxaay Plan!	Documentary	Screen writer, director	26 m
2009	It's my man !	Documentary	Director	65 m
2020	Mbas mi (The plague by Albert Camus)	Short, drama	Director, producer	8 m

== Awards ==
Gaï Ramaka won various awards, such as:

- Baaw-Naan/Rites de pluie (1985) - Masque d'Or for documentary at the Deuxième Festival International du Film sur le Carnaval et la Fête à Nice. Special mention by the jury at the Quatrième Festival International Jean Rouch/Bilan du Film Ethnographique in Paris. First Prize for shorts of the Second Festival of Perugia, Italy.
- Ainsi-soit-il (1997) - Silver Lion Award, First Prize Corto-cortissimo, 54th Venice Film Festival 1997. Best Film Prize, Festival Vues d'Afrique Montreal 1998.
- Karmen Geï (2001) - Best Feature Award of the Pan African Film Festival (PAFF Los Angeles) 2006.

== Literature ==
- Adesokan, Akin (2019). "6. 'The Invisible Government of the Powerful'. Joseph Gaï Ramaka's Cinema of Power". In Harrow, Kenneth W.; Garritano, Carmela (eds.). A companion to African cinema. Wiley-Blackwell companions to national cinemas. Hoboken, NJ: John Wiley & Sons, Inc. pp. 136–154. ISBN 9781119100317.

== See also ==
- Cinema of Senegal
- List of Senegalese films
