= Saïkati =

1992 Kenyan film

- Directed by: Anne Mungai
- Starring: Esther Muthee Regina Macharia Eric Babu Anthony Njuguna
- Release date: 1992
- Country: Kenya

Saïkati is a 1992 Kenyan film directed by the filmmaker Anne Mungai. It was the first feature film by a Nairobi-based female filmmaker.

== Plot ==
A young Masai woman has a future determined for her by relatives to marry the son of the chief. However, she plans to improve herself through education. She runs from the village to seek a better life in the capital, Nairobi, where she faces several challenges.

== Cast ==
- Esther Muthee
- Regina Macharia
- Eric Babu
- Anthony Njuguna
