= Tom Ribeiro =

Ghanaian writer and director (born 1935)

- Born: 1935 (age 90–91)
- Education: City University of New York
- Occupations: Filmmaker; Producer; Director; Editor
- Notable work: Dede (1992)

Tom Ribeiro (born 1935) is a Ghanaian writer and director. He wrote and directed several Ghanaian movies made in the post-colonial era, mainly under the production rights of the Ghana Film Industry Corporation (GFIC), which was set up by Osagyefo Dr Kwame Nkrumah. These movies included Genesis Chapter X (1977), Dede (1992), Set on Edge (1999) The Visitor (1983), Out of Sight, Out of Love (1983), Rituals of Fire and The Village Court.

== Career ==
Ribeiro was a student at the City University of New York, New York City. He went on to serve in various roles and capacities as an assistant and a director on different pieces of works. These ranged from advertisements, documentaries, features, and educational works of art.

Of his works on record, Genesis Chapter X (1977), is known to have starred George Williams. Dede (1992) starred David Dontoh and Mavis Odonkor and was the first video produced by the GFIC. 'Set on Edge' (1999) was also produced by the GFIC but was not released as members on the Censorship Board, and the police representative during that time, expressed that the production would tarnish the reputation of the police in the sight of the public (Meyer, 2015).

Ribeiro was one of the pioneers of the Ghana film industry, the then Gold Coast. Other persons credited for the birthing of the industry are Reverend Chris Hesse, Frank Parks, Sam Aryeetey and Seth Ashong Katai.

== Awards ==
In 2015, the National Film and Television Institute (NAFTI) at an awards night, honored Tom Ribeiro and twenty-nine (29) other filmmakers for their important contributions to the Ghanaian film industry. The others include Ivan Quashigah, George Arcton-Tettey, Samuel Nai, Veronica Quarshie-Nai, Socrate Safo, Roger Quartey, Alex Bannerman, Kishore Nankani, Alhaji Mumuni, B. M. Imoro, Steve Hackman, Hammond Mensah, Allen Gyimah, Billy Agbotsi, Mark Coleman, Imoro Yaro, Seth Ashong Katai and William Akuffo, Nana King, Richard Quartey, Mohammed Gado, Bob Smith, Kwesi Enchill, Samuel Nyamekye, Akwasi Badu, Alex Boateng, Augustine Abbey, and Hajia Meizongo.

== Filmography ==
- Genesis Chapter X (1977)
- Dede (1992)
- Set on Edge (1999)
- The Visitor (1983)
- Out of Sight, Out of Love (1983)
- The Village Court
- Rituals of Fire
