= Cinema of Mauritius =

The cinema of Mauritius refers to films made in Mauritius or by Mauritius-related filmmakers or companies. Mauritian cinema does not have a long-established and continuous tradition and organization. However, there have been recent efforts to encourage international filmmakers to shoot on the island and establish an indigenous film industry. Both Western and Indian films are watched by Mauritians.

== Filmmaking in Mauritius ==
Filmmaking in Mauritius started with "sporadic attempts at making home movies in the 1950s". In 1986 a Mauritius Film Development Corporation (MFDC) was established, under the aegis of the Ministry of Arts and Culture, to encourage the development of a film industry in Mauritius. The MFDC helped foreign directors obtain permits to shoot on the island. The popularity of the Bollywood movie Kuch Kuch Hota Hai, filmed in Mauritius in 1997, prompted other Bollywood producers to take advantage of the island's scenery. However, for a long time the MFDC lacked the organizational stability to provide consistent support for local filmmakers. In 2007, the Île Courts International Short Film Festival was established, run by the non-profit organization Porteurs d'Images. In 2013, a Film Rebate Scheme was established to provide both local and international filmmakers with a financial incentive to shoot on the island, and the terms of the rebate were extended in 2016. In October 2017, the Government initiated a Mauritius Cinema Week, and a second edition of the event was held in 2018. Other recent developments include the creation of private film school in 2019 and other festivals.

== Film audiences in Mauritius ==
Films in Mauritius are predominantly broadcast or released in French, with some in English or Indian languages. In 2006, Bénarès, directed and written by Barlen Pyamootoo, became the first film in Mauritian Creole.

The Star Cinema within the Bagatelle Mall of Mauritius in Moka contains six screens, with a total seating capacity of 1,200. Other film theaters include the Cine Klassic Movie Theater and Cinema Star at the Caudon Waterfront, and Cinema ABC in Rose Hill.

== See also ==
- List of Mauritian films
