= Irebu =

- Location within Democratic Republic of the Congo
- Coordinates: 0.6070950°S 17.78019°E
- Country: Democratic Republic of the Congo
- Climate: Af

Irebu is a township located in the Équateur province of the Democratic Republic of the Congo. The only notable feature of this settlement is that it lies on the confluence of the great Congo river and its main tributary, the Ubangi river.
