= Tidiane Aw =

Senegalese film actor and director (1935–2009)

- Born: 1935; Kébémer, Senegal
- Died: 30 May 2009 (aged 73–74); Paris, France
- Education: Institute of Cinematography
- Occupations: film actor, screenwriter, director, and producer

Tidiane Aw (born 1935 – 30 May 2009) was a Senegalese film actor, screenwriter, director and producer. He participated in a range of films, both fiction and documentary as well as short and full feature.

== Biography ==
Born in Kébémer in Louga Region, Senegal, Aw studied at the Institute of Cinematography in Hamburg, Germany. He completed his cinematic training in Paris at the Office for Radio Cooperation (OCORA). Among the precursors of Senegalese television, in the time of Mamadou Dia, who was president of the Senegalese Government Council from 1957 to 1962, Aw worked for primarily for educational television of the state owned channels until 1972.

Aw's first production was a 35-minute educational documentary titled, which explores the customs of the Lebou people and was released in 1968. Aw served as director, screenwriter, producer, and actor for the film Le Bracelet de bronze (the bronze bracelet). It was also his first colored film.

== Filmography ==
- Réalités (1968)
- Pour ceux qui savent (1971)
- Le Bracelet de bronze (1973)
- Le Certificat (1981)
- Soins de santé primaires (1983)
