= Lolo Arziki =

Cape Verdean film director

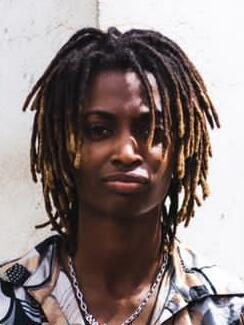
- Born: February 5, 1992 (age 34); Maio, Cape Verde
- Education: New University of Lisbon, Polytechnic Institute of Tomar (pt)
- Occupations: Filmmaker, LGBT rights activist

Lolo Arziki (born February 5, 1992) is a Cape Verdean documentary filmmaker and LGBT rights activist.

== Biography ==
Arziki was born on the island of Maio and moved to Portugal at the age of 13. They currently live between Portugal and Luxembourg. They graduated in film at the Polytechnic Institute of Tomar and completed a Master's degree in aesthetics and artistic studies at the Faculty of Social and Human Sciences at the New University of Lisbon.

As a black feminist, their work explores themes such as sexuality, blackness and gender. Arziki also advocates for the legal prohibition of homophobia in Cape Verde, where homosexuality only ceased to be a crime in 2004.

Arziki is non-binary.

== Filmography ==
=== As director ===
- Homestay (2016)
- Relatos de uma Rapariga Nada Púdica (2016)
- Sakudi (2020)

== Accolades ==
- Homestay:
  - 2017: Prémio Revelação Nacional, Plateau International Film Festival - Praia, Cape Verde
  - 2017: Prémio Estreia Mundial Televisão, Avanca Film Festival - Portugal
