= Eddy Munyaneza =

Burundian filmmaker

- Born: Eddy Munyaneza; October 24, 1981 (age 43); Gitega, Burundi
- Occupation(s): Director, screenwriter, producer, assistant director, editor
- Years active: 2008–present
- Children: 3

Eddy Munyaneza (born 24 October 1981) is a Burundian filmmaker. Considered to be one of Burundi's most promising filmmakers, Munyaneza is notable as the director of the critically acclaimed documentaries Le troisième vide and Lendemains incertains. Apart from filmmaking, he is also a writer, producer and editor.

== Personal life ==
He was born on 24 October 1981 in a small village close to Gitega town in Burundi. He completed education in 2002. Later he completed a master's degree in cinema at Saint-Louis, Senegal.

== Career ==
In 2004 he got the opportunity to work with a company called 'Menya Média' where he trained in audiovisual production. In 2009, he participated as a machinist in the short film Na Wewe, directed by Ivan Goldschmidt. The film was later nominated for the Oscars in 2011.

In 2010, he released his maiden feature-length documentary Histoire d’une haine manquée. The documentary deals with the story of how his Tutsi siblings and himself saved by their Hutu neighbors during the Burundian genocide in 1993. The film won several awards at Festival International du Cinéma et de l’Audiovisuel du Burundi (FESTICAB). In the same year, he received the Prix Spécial Award for Human Rights at Panafrican Film and Television Festival of Ouagadougou (FESPACO). Meanwhile, he was honored with a Certificate of Merit by the president of Burundi, Pierre Nkurunziza, in Kirundo. However, he criticized president Nkurunziza for his controversial run for a third term.

In 2016 he released his second documentary film, Le troisième vide. It included recordings of the violent unrest of the two-year crisis of Nkurunziza's government where between 500 and 2,000 people were tortured and killed, and 400,000 were exiled. After releasing the film, he received anonymous calls with death threats. Therefore he fled the country in late 2016 and separated from his wife and three children. However, he returned to Burundi in July 2016 and in April 2017 to get additional footage for Le troisième vide. Later in the year, the film received the award for Best Documentary at the annual Guido Huysmans Young African Film Makers Award (YAFMA).

In 2018, he made the documentary Lendemains incertains which deals with brutal stories of Burundians who remained or fled the country during the political crisis in June 2015. The film had its premiere in Brussels, Belgium at the famous Palace Cinema. It received positive reviews from critics and was screened at several international film festivals including Festival de Cine Africano (FCAT) in Spain and Afrika Filmfestival in Belgium. The film was screened at the International Film Festival and Forum on Human Rights in Geneva. The film later won the award for the Best Documentary at the African Movie Academy Award 2018.

== Filmography ==
Year	Film	Role	Genre	Ref.
2010	Histoire d’une haine manquée	Director, producer, writer	Documentary	
2016	Le troisième vide	Director, producer, writer	Documentary	
2018	Lendemains incertains	Director, producer, writer	Documentary	
