= Cinema of Burundi =

Film industry in Burundi

The Cinema of Burundi is the filmmaking and film industry in Burundi.

== History ==
Prior to the Burundi Civil War, Burundi's cinematic history was vastly undocumented.

The first recording of film in Burundi occurred in 1980, when Burundian Jean-Michel Hussi Nyamusimba produced the first Burundi film, a French coproduction called Ni-Ni. In 1992 Burundi’s first feature film, Gito l’Ingrat was released, a Swiss-French Burundi co-production directed by Leonce Ngabo.

Burundi film in the 1990s was also pioneered by women, most notably by Sham-Jeanne Hakizimana, who headed television programs at National Radio and Television of Burundi. She produced the documentary film, Une Burundaise aujourd'hui in 1991.

After the civil war, the Burundi film industry was revived in 2007, when Canadian filmmaker Christopher Redmond and Raymond Kalisa, a videographer from Rwanda, co-founded the Burundi Film Centre as a training ground for aspiring filmmakers. They recruited 36 young Burundians for a two-month training in film theory and production.

== Festivals ==
- Festival International du Cinéma et de l’Audiovisuel du Burundi
