= Pierre-Marie Dong =

Gabonese film director

- Born: 1945; Libreville
- Died: 11 December 2006 (aged 60–61); Libreville
- Occupation: film director

Pierre-Marie Dong (1945-2006) was a Gabonese film director, who was also Minister of Culture in Gabon at the end of his life. Along with Charles Mensah and Simon Augé, Dong "is considered the pioneer of Gabonese film".

== Life ==
Pierre-Marie Dong was born in Libreville.

Dong's first films were supported by Gabon's national television company. His short film Sur le sentier du requiem won second prize at the 1972 FESPACO. The following year, Identité won the FESPACO prize for the most authentic African film. That film, and his later Obali, co-directed with Charles Mensah, looked at the dilemmas of identify and alienation felt by Westernised Africans.

Dong succeeded Étienne Moussirou as president of the National Council of Communication (CNC). In January 2006 he was appointed Minister of Culture in Gabon.

== Death ==
He died on 11 December 2006 in Libreville.

Dong's 1972 film Identité was chosen to open FESPACO in 2013.

== Films ==
- Carrefour humain, 1969. Short film.
- Lésigny, 1970. Short film.
- Sur le sentier du requiem, 1971. Short film.
- Identité, 1972
- (with Charles Mensah) Obali, 1977
- (with Charles Mensah) Ayouma, 1978
- Demain, un jour nouveau, 1979
