= Salem Mekuria =

- Born: 1947 (age 78–79); Addis Ababa, Ethiopia
- Education: Macalester College, San Francisco State University
- Occupations: Filmmaker, video artist

Salem Mekuria (born 1947) is an Ethiopian-born independent filmmaker, video artist and educator living in the United States.

== Life and work ==
Mekuria was born in Addis Ababa. She was educated in Axum and in Addis Ababa where she visited the Empress Menen School for Girls and later started studies in architecture at the Haile Selassie I University. She moved to the United States in 1967 where she studied political science and journalism at Macalester College. Mekuria earned a MA in education technology and media production from San Francisco State University in 1978. She later worked at the WGBH TV station in Boston, starting as a secretary but eventually becoming a producer for the Nova series. Mekuria is the Luella LaMer Professor of Women's Studies in the Art department at Wellesley College.

She writes, produces and directs films and video installations related to Ethiopia. Her work has appeared at the 50th Venice Biennale, the CinemAfrica Film Festival in Sweden, the Museum of Fine Arts, Boston, the National Museum of African Art of the Smithsonian Institution, documenta 11 in Berlin and the New York African Film Festival in New York City.

== Works ==
=== Films ===
- Our Place In The Sun (1988)
- As I Remember It: Portrait of Dorothy West (1991)
- Sidet: Forced Exile (1991) – documentary
- Ye Wonz Maibel (Deluge) (1997)

=== Video installations ===
- Ruptures: A Many-Sided Story, Venice Biennale (2003)
- Imagining Tobia (2006-2007)
- Square stories, Addis Ababa (2010)

== Awards ==
=== Fellowships ===
- Fellowship from the Radcliffe Institute for Advanced Study
- New England Media Fellowship
- 1991: Massachusetts Artists Foundation Award
- 1991–1992: Fellowship from the Bunting Institute at Radcliffe College
- 1993: Lila Wallace-Reader's Digest International Artist Residency Fellowship
- 1995: Rockefeller Foundation Intercultural Media Fellowship
- 2003–2004: Fulbright Scholar

=== Film awards ===
- 1991: Juror's Citation, Black Maria Film & Video Festival.
- 1993: Sidet: Forced Exile received a Silver Apple at the National Educational Film and Video Festival
- Sidet: Forced Exile received first place in the National Black Programming Consortium's Prized Pieces and Outstanding Independent film at the New England Film & Video Festival
- 1997: Director's Citation, Black Maria Film & Video Festival.
- Our Place In The Sun was nominated for an Emmy Award
- Ye Wonz Maibel (Deluge) received first place in the National Black Programming Consortium's Prized Pieces
