= Benoît Ramampy =

Malagasy film director

- Born: March 1947
- Citizenship: Madagascar
- Occupation: Film director

Benoît Ramampy (1947–1996) was a Malagasy film director.

== Life ==
Ramampy was born in Ambalavao in 1947. He trained in Paris at the world music record label Ocora and Radio France. On his return to Madagascar, he studied at the Malagasy Production Centre.

His short film The Accident, about a son who tragically kills his father, won the award for best short film at the 4th FESPACO.

== Films ==
- L'accident [The accident], 1972. Short film.
- Dahalo, Dahalo..., 1984. Feature film.
- The Price of Peace / Le Prix de la paix, 1987. Feature film.
