= Joseph Kenneth Ssebaggala =

- Born: Joseph Kenneth Ssebaggala
- Occupations: Screenwriter, film director
- Years active: 2008–present

Joseph Kenneth Ssebaggala or "Joseph S KEN" (born 1983) is a Ugandan film director, screenwriter.

== Career ==
In 2008, he started taking film training and workshops, like the Durban Talent Campus 2011. As a writer, producer, and director, he runs a film company called Zenken Films, under which he has produced two of his feature films: Master on Duty and That Small Piece. He is the recent winner of Best Director in the 2015 Uganda Film Festival with his House Arrest.

His 2015 Call 112 and House arrest were nominated in the 2016 Africa Magic Viewers' Choice Awards (AMVCA) for best East African film, Best Lighting, and overall film of the year making him the most nominated Ugandan so far in the Awards.

== Filmography ==
- Master on Duty (2009)
- Akataka/That Small Piece (2011)
- Reform (2014)
- Call 112 (2015)
- House Arrest (2015)
