= Karmen Geï =

2001 film by Joseph Gaï Ramaka

- Directed by: Joseph Gaï Ramaka
- Written by: Joseph Gaï Ramaka; Prosper Mérimée
- Produced by: Richard Sadler
- Starring: Djeïnaba Diop Gaï; Stephanie Biddle; Magaye Adama Niang
- Cinematography: Bernard Chatry
- Edited by: Hélène Girard
- Music by: Julien Jouga; David Murray; Doudou N'Diaye Rose
- Production companies: Euripide Productions; Film Tonic; Les Ateliers de l'arche
- Release date: June 27, 2001
- Running time: 86 minutes
- Countries: Senegal; Canada; France
- Languages: French; Wolof

Karmen Geï is a musical drama film, directed by Joseph Gaï Ramaka and released in 2001. A coproduction of companies from Senegal, France and Canada, the film is an adaptation of Georges Bizet's opera Carmen in a Senegalese setting, with Karmen portrayed as a seductive bisexual criminal who escapes prison to revive her smuggling ring.

The film stars Djeïnaba Diop Gaï as Karmen Geï, with a supporting cast including Magaye Niang, Stephanie Biddle, Thierno Ndiaye Doss, Dieynaba Niang, El Hadj Ndiaye, Aïssatou Diop, Widemir Normil, Yandé Codou Sène, Massamba Madieye, Ibrahima M'Baye, Coly Mbaye, Abasse Wade, Ibrahima Khalil Paye, Patricia Gomis, Fatou Sow, Awa Sène Sarr, Mayanne Mboup, Oumi Samb, Doudou N'Diaye Rose, Ndèye Thiaba Diop, Samba Cisse, Jo Couly Bouschanzi, Elian Wilfrid Mayila, Abdoulaye Gnagna N'Diaye, Mor Ba, Ndèye Maguette Niang, Malik Niasse and Mouhamadou Gueye.

== Distribution ==
The film premiered in the Directors' Fortnight stream at the 2001 Cannes Film Festival. It screened in Dakar on July 22, 2001, but was subsequently banned for distribution in the country after the Muslim Brotherhood protested the use of Mouride chants in a key scene as "blasphemous".

It had its Canadian premiere in September, in the Planet Africa program at the 2001 Toronto International Film Festival.

== Critical response ==
Dennis Harvey of Variety wrote that "in general, Karmen works better on the level of atmosphere and buoyant, party-hearty set pieces than it does as a cogent action melodrama. Pic’s initial energy burst wanes, though not fatally, once story hits the downhill stretch. Nonetheless, it’s still great fun. Neither p’opera nor conventional tuner, package finds many ways to integrate music that ranges from dynamic percussion busking to hymnals, proto-rap 'toastings,' piano balladry, soundtracked Afropop and jazz. There are no real 'production numbers', sole non-naturalistic device being the neat use of ensemble-mimed choral recitative, which offers populist p.o.v. commentary on the action during numerous sequences."

Writing for The Province, Chris Hewitt opined that "frankly, there's not a believable minute in Karmen Gei, which is in French and Wolof, but who cares? It's sexy, muscular and fast in a way that transcends logic to become something wondrous."

== Awards ==
Hélène Girard received a Jutra Award nomination for Best Editing at the 5th Jutra Awards in 2003.
