= Mars Kadiombo Yamba Bilonda =

Congolese actor and screenwriter (1958–2021)

- Born: 3 March 1958; Katanga Province, Belgian Congo, Belgium
- Died: 15 July 2021 (aged 63); Kinshasa, Democratic Republic of the Congo
- Occupations: Actor; Screenwriter

Mars Kadiombo Yamba Bilonda (3 March 1958 – 15 July 2021) was a Congolese actor, screenwriter, and film director. He was also a stage actor and director.

== Filmography ==
- La face cachée de Mobutu (2016)
- Coloré (2019)
- Paris à tout prix (2021)
