= Thato Rantao Mwosa =

- Citizenship: Botswana
- Occupations: Filmmaker, Film director

Thato Rantao Mwosa is a Botswana-American writer-director, illustrator, playwright, educator, and game inventor.

== Career ==
Mwosa's first film Don't Leave Me was shown at the New York Short Film Festival. Her second film, Don't Tell Me You Love Me, was an adaptation of a poem by a Swazi spoken word artist, Deslisile. The film portrayed the domestic violence accompanying the demise of a marriage. It won the 'Best Emerging Film Maker' award at the 7th Roxbury Film Festival in 2005. Her film The Day of My Wedding was the official selection of BETJ now BET Her Best Shorts Program. Her TV series Ya M'Afrika, screened on the Gabonese satellite channel 3A Telesud, was a fictional drama series following the lives of four African women living as housemates in Queens, New York. Her 2011 documentary A Tribe of Women followed women working for peace in Sudan. Mwosa's feature narrative film Memoirs of a Black Girl will be released in 2021. It is the official selection of the Toronto International Women Film Festival.

== Filmography ==
- Don't Leave Me, 2005. Short film.
- Don't Tell Me You Love Me, 2005. Short film
- The Day of My Wedding, 2007
- Ya M'Afrika, 2007. TV show.
- An African in America, 2008
- Rapping for Life, 2009
- A Tribe of Women, 2011. Documentary.
- Memoirs of a Black Girl, 2021. Feature Narrative Film
