= Januário Afonso =

Santomean film director

- Born: 30 September 1963 (age 62); São Marçal, São Tomé
- Citizenship: Santomean
- Occupation: film director
- Known for: Imprudência, Fogo do Apagar da Vida, 2001 and O Vosso Amor, o Meu Sorriso, 2006

Januário Afonso is a filmmaker from São Tomé and Príncipe born in 1963. His first experience in cinema was working with Austrian filmmaker Herbert Brödl on Brödl's movie Little Fruit from the Equator (1998) which was shot in São Tomé. Afonso graduated in documentary film studies in Portugal (2006) and Scotland (2007), and obtained a law degree at São Tomé in 2016. He made feature films and documentaries on current social themes such as AIDS and domestic violence. Afonso collaborated with Angolan film director Orlando Fortunato de Oliveira on Fortunato's drama movie Batepá (2010).

== Filmography ==
Afonso's films include:

Year	Film	Genre	Role	Duration
2001	Imprudência, Fogo do Apagar da Vida (translated title: Recklessness, life quenching fire)	Drama, tragedy about AIDS	Director	75 min.
2006	O Vosso Amor, o Meu Sorriso (translated title: Your love, my smile)	Drama on domestic violence against women	Director	55 min.
2007	Os que têm sida são iguais aos que não têm (translated title: Those who have AIDS are the same as those who don't)	Six-episode miniseries about AIDS	Director	
2008	Transportador de sonhos (translated title: Conveyor of dreams)	Documentary	Director	27 min.
2012, 2013	O Avesso do Vida (translated title: The wrong side of life)	Drama on the social exclusion of elderly people	Director	46 min.

== Competition ==
In 2015 Afonso won the Unesco Community of Portuguese Language Countries (CPLP) Audiovisual competition in the television fiction (FICTV) category with his adaptation project for the story Rosa do Riboque (Riboque Rose) by Santomean writer Albertino Bragança.
