= Caroline Kamya =

Ugandan film director

- Education: BSc in architecture and urban design; MA in TV documentary from Goldsmiths College
- Occupations: Film director and producer

'Caroline Kamya''' is a British-Ugandan filmmaker, producer and entrepreneur. She is the founder and chief executive officer of IAMNATIV, an African media and production company.

== Early life ==
Kamya was born in Uganda and raised in Kenya and the U.K.

== Education and Career ==
Kamya has an MA in TV documentary from Goldsmiths College, London, and a Bachelor of Science (BSc) in architecture and urban design from Bartlett School of Architecture, London.

Caroline Kamya is a trailblazing Ugandan British director, producer, and entrepreneur renowned for powerful storytelling and championing African-led narratives. She earned her Master’s in television documentary from the University of London. After working for the BBC and UK production houses, she returned to Uganda in 2004, catalyzing her career at the Maisha Film Lab, founded by Mira Nair. Mentored by Abderrahmane Sissako and BBC’s Jane Mote, Kamya further honed her skills at the 2007 Berlinale Talent Campus and co-founded the Uganda Arts and Media Academy. In 2010, she made history as the first Ugandan woman to direct an internation locally shot feature film that went global, debuting with IMANI, which launched at Berlinale and collected numerous global accolades: Best Feature Film (Silver Dhow) at ZIFF (Tanzania), Best Film in African Language at AMAA (Nigeria), Special Jury Mention for Direction at Durban IFF, Best Director at FCAT (Spain), Best Feature Film at Afrikamera (Poland), Best Digital Feature Film (Silver) at Cairo IFF, and Best Film at Vues d'Afrique (Canada). Later, Kamya moved to the Netherlands as Head of Channel for one of the largest short-form content platforms before returning in 2020 and launching IAMNATIV.com, a hub connecting African creatives with global media partnerships, while also serving as a filmmaker directly for UNICEF based in Uganda in 2020. With over 100 productions—including documentaries, short films, reality shows, commercials, and promos—Kamya continues to lead groundbreaking work. Her 2019 documentary, The Peace Between (France/Denmark), was nominated for Best Short Doc at NewFilmmakers LA. In 2023, she produced and executive produced the dark comedy feature for MNET, winning two post-production awards at FCAT (Spain). She continues to develop projects of impact, such as her second feature-length documentary exploring family and traumas, as well as serving on the jury for FCAT 2025. Her commitment to African creatives motivated her to create iamnativ.com, an award-winning platform to provide opportunities for content creators living and working in Africa.

Selection of Awards & Recognition

- IMANI (2010):

   * Nomination—Best Feature Film, Berlinale International Film Festival, Germany
   * Best Feature Film (Silver Dhow), Zanzibar International Film Festival, Tanzania
   * Best Film in an African Language, African Movie Academy Awards, Nigeria (also double-listed)
   * Special Jury Mention for Direction, Durban International Film Festival, South Africa
   * Best Director, Tarifa African Film Festival, Spain
   * Best Feature Film, Afrikamera African Film Festival, Poland
   * Best Digital Feature Film (Silver), Cairo International Film Festival, Egypt
   * Best Film, Vues d’Afrique Film Festival, Canada[2]

- Taxi Girl (2009):

   * Best Film & Best Director, Uhuru Film Festival, USA[2]

- Real Saharawi (2007):

   * Best East African Documentary, LOLA Children’s Film Festival, Kenya[2]

- Women Wake Up (2006):

   * Best Short Film, Pan African Film Festival, Senegal[2]

- Dancing Wizard (2006):

   * Silver Award, Zanzibar International Film Festival, Tanzania[2]

- Real Saharawi (2006):

   * Gold Award, Zanzibar International Film Festival, Tanzania[2]

- Life Choices (2005):

   * Commendation Award, One World Awards, UK

- The Peace Between (2019):

   * Nominee — Best Short Documentary, NewFilmmakers LA, USA[2]

- Kasozi Heights:

   * Two post-production awards, FCAT (Tarifa African Film Festival), Spain[2]

Grants, Funding & Mentorship

- 2017 – EEA & Crowdfunding: The Peace Between
- 2014 – DocuBox Film Fund: Duende Africano
- 2014 – Göteborg Film Fund & 2012 Arte Commendation at Berlinale: Hot Comb
- 2013 – Göteborg Film Fund: Hot Comb
- 2012 – TPM Arte Commendation: Hot Comb

Entrepreneurship awards and prizes

- Winners & Pitch Awards: UNDP Innovation Fund (2022)

Zidicircle Pitch Accelerator Netherlands (2020–21) Volition Pitch USA (2021)

- Nominee, NABC Doing Business in Africa

(Ceekay Films, Netherlands) 2020 Mentorship: Kuva Africa Mentor (2023), nurturing emerging talents.

Workshops, Labs & Jury Service

- Labs: 2006 Maisha Film Lab (Uganda), 2007 Berlinale Talent Campus, 2010 DoxLab (Copenhagen), 2012 Binger Film Lab (Amsterdam), 2014 Locarno Open Doors & Durban FilmMart
- Jury Service: DOX Copenhagen (2012), CORDOBA African FF (2013), Hot Docs Blue Ice Fund Canada (2016), El Ojo Cojo Festival Spain (2017), World Cinema Film Festival Netherlands (2017), FCAT, Spain 2025

Connect: LinkedIn – Caroline Kamya

== Select Filmography ==
- Kasozi Heights (Feature Drama) 2023
- The Peace Between (Feature Documentary), 2019
- Chips and Liver Girls (short), 2011
- Fire Fly (Short, Experimental), 2011
- Imani (Feature film), 2010
- Taxi Girl (short), 2009
- Real Saharawi (short)2007
- Women Wake Up (short)2006
- Dancing Wizard (short)2006
- Life Choices (Series)2005
