= Manouchka Kelly Labouba =

Gabonese filmmaker and scholar

Prof. Manouchka Kelly Labouba مانوشكا كيلي لابوبا
- Born: Manouchka Kelly Labouba; July 15, 1957 (age 69); Gabon
- Other names: Manouch, KLM
- Education: University of California, Santa Barbara; Bordeaux Montaigne University; University of Southern California
- Occupations: Director, producer, screen writer
- Years active: 2004–present
- Height: 5 ft 5 in (165 cm)

Manouchka Kelly Labouba (Arabic: مانوشكا كيلي لابوبا), is a Gabonese director, screenwriter, and producer of short films including the critically acclaimed Marty et la tendre dame, Le guichet automatique and Le divorce. With the release of Le divorce in 2008 she became the youngest director in the history Gabon, and the first Gabonese woman to direct a fiction film in the country. She is also an academic, cinematographer, editor and camera operator.

== Academic career ==
In 2005, she studied Film & Media Studies at University of California, Santa Barbara. Then, in 2007, he obtained Master de Recherche, Arts from Bordeaux Montaigne University. Later he graduated with a M.A. Critical Studies and then Ph.D. Cinema and Media Studies from University of Southern California to obtain and also graduated with a Certificate in the Business of Entertainment.

== Cinema career ==
In 2004, she made the short Bouchées d'Amours. It was officially selected at the 2004 Chartres National Student Film Festival. In 2008, she made her debut cinema production Le divorce, which was critically acclaimed at several international film festivals. This 40 minute short was included in official selection at the 2008 Carthage Film Festival, official selection at the 2009 Panafrican Film and Television Festival of Ouagadougou (FESPACO), official selection at the 2009 Écrans Noirs Festival, official selection at the 2010 Ouagadougou African Women Film Festival. It was also selected out of competition at the 2010 Abidjan International Short Film Festival (FFAA) and 2012 World Music & Independent Film Festival. She also won the award for the Best Directorial Debut at 2009 Eacrans Noirs Festival.

In 2010, she directed four short films: Bébé Portable, Combien Ca Coute?, Enfant De Ta Mére, and Le Menteur & Le Voleur where the later included in official selection at the 2010 Écrans Noirs Festival. She also worked as the first assistant director in three shorts: La Particuliére, Les Bonnes Maniéres, and La Guerre des Ordures. In 2011 she directed the short Le guichet automatique which was included in official selection at the 2011 Écrans Noirs Festival.

Apart from direction, she worked as the writer for many short films including: From D.W.G. to D.W.Jr: The Black ManÕs Burden (2006) and Michel Ndaot: Entre Ombres et Lumiéres (2008).

== Filmography ==
Year	Film	Role	Genre	Ref.
2006	From D.W.G. to D.W.Jr: The Black ManÕs Burden	writer	Short film	
2008	Michel Ndaot: Entre Ombres et Lumiéres	writer	Short film	
2008	Le divorce (The divorce)	Director, writer	Short film	
2010	Le Menteur & Le Voleur (The Liar & The Thief)	director, writer, producer	Short film	
2012	Dans la fraternité (In Brotherhood)	assistant camera, camera operator, dolly grip	Short film	
2011	Mon père africain (My African Father)	director, writer, producer	Short film	
2011	Le guichet automatique (The ATM)	Director, writer, cinematographer, editor	Short film	
2013	Marty et la tendre dame (Marty and the Tender Lady)	Director, writer	Short film	
2013	Un échange (An Exchange)	dolly grip	Short film	
