= Cinema of Guinea-Bissau =

Filmmaking industry in Guinea-Bissau

The cinema of Guinea-Bissau arose along with the country's independence. Since the Guinea-Bissau War of Independence, film in the country has remained an underfunded state-controlled industry. The earliest filmmaking in the country was influenced by Amílcar Cabral's views on propaganda, and consisted of documentation of the war of independence. Although the war was documented by foreign filmmakers, Cabral arranged for the education of four young Bissau-Guineans in Cuba in film technique. Early Bissau-Guinean films were produced by this group, and consisted of propaganda documentaries about the revolutionary struggle, although much of their footage is now lost.

Filmmaking in the country after independence suffered due to a lack of governmental support and funds, although the Instituto Nacional de Cinema was founded during this time. The 1980 coup d'état also interrupted film production in the country. Guinea-Bissau's first feature films were produced in 1987, though by 1995 the country had only produced a few feature films. Guinea-Bissau's films continue to rely heavily on foreign co-productions and collaborations.

== History ==
=== Revolutionary beginnings ===
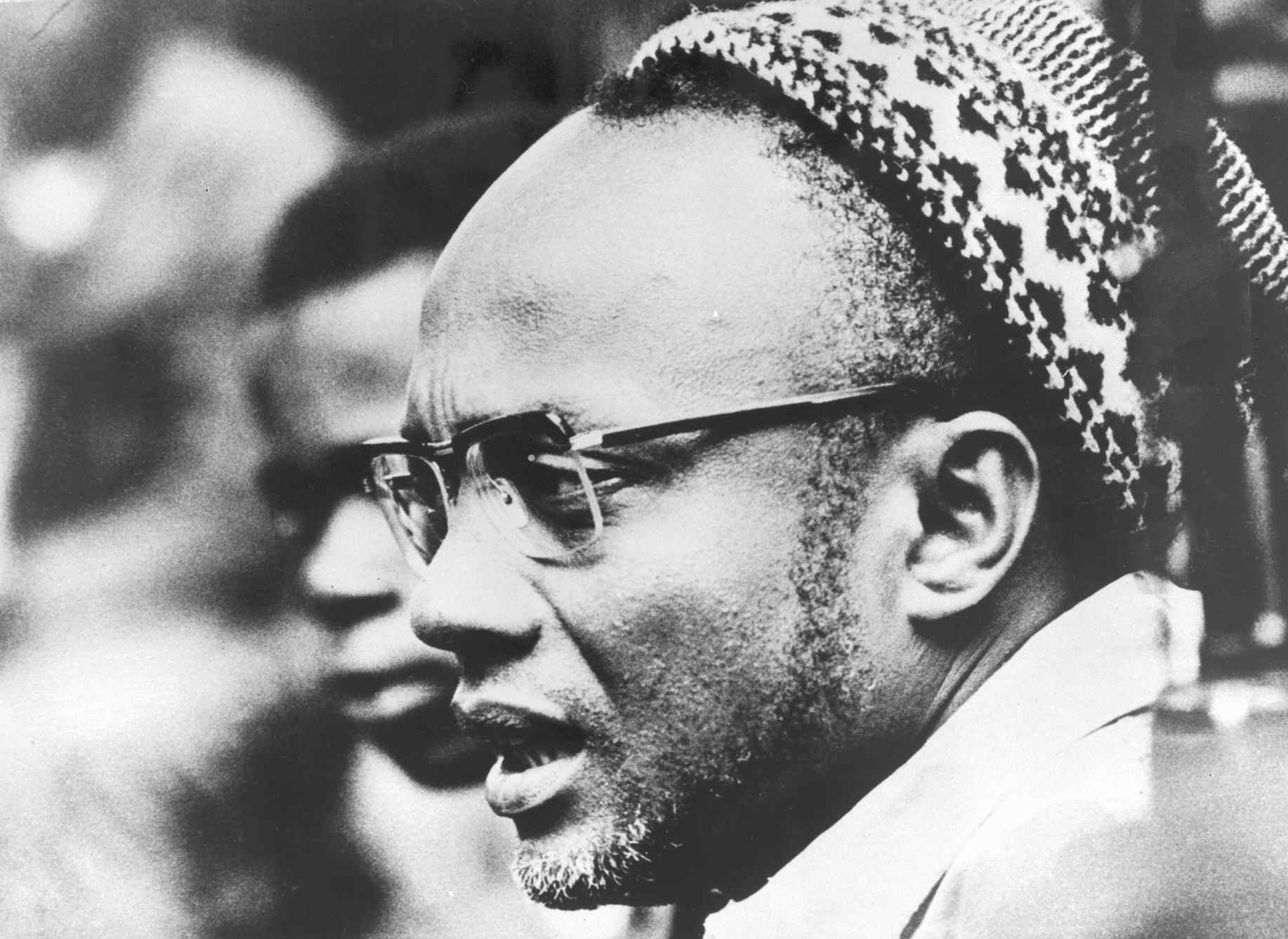
Revolutionary Amílcar Cabral believed cinema could be used as a propaganda tool in the Guinea-Bissau War of Independence.

Guinea-Bissau won independence from Portugal in 1974, after a 15-year conflict. Early attitudes toward film in the emerging nation emerged from the ideology of Amilcar Cabral, leader of the revolutionary African Party for the Independence of Guinea and Cape Verde (PAIGC). Cabral believed that film was a medium well-suited for propagandizing the country's independence struggle, and that Bissau-Guineans should use film to present their own images and representations of themselves. To this end, Cabral sent high schoolers José Balama Columba, Josefina Crato, Flora Gomes, and Sana na N’Hada to the Cuban Film Institute in 1967, where they would learn film techniques under Santiago Álvarez and finish their schooling. Cuba's government was aligned with the PAIGC's goals, and Álvarez himself was a proponent of the Third Cinema movement, which emphasized a non-colonial and revolutionary perspective in film, as well as an experimental, low-budget style. This school of revolutionary filmmaking influenced the Bissau-Guineans. Upon returning from Cuba, the four filmmakers documented the ongoing war for independence, with the guidance of Senegalese filmmaker Paulin Soumanou Vieyra. The group would save up leftover film to venture into "the bush" to document the war. Connections with Cuban film persisted during this period, with one of the first films shot in Guinea-Bissau being Cuban filmmaker José Massip's Madina de Boé (1969). Most films produced in this period were by foreign filmmakers, who aimed to encourage aid to the PAIGC overseas. Early filmmaking in Guinea-Bissau concentrated on documentaries, tied to the revolutionary concept of participao popular. The filmmakers were distrusted by many PAIGC combatants, posing a challenge to the recording of footage.

Much of the footage shot by Bissau-Guinean filmmakers during the war was not used as internal propaganda, as the country did not have labs with which to develop film, leading to much of it being exported. According to N'Hada, much of what was filmed was sent "to Conakry and we would never hear of its whereabouts again." Even the footage of the country's proclamation of independence ended up in the Soviet Union. The foundational Bissau-Guinean film is the 30-minute documentary O regresso de Amílcar Cabral (The Return of Amílcar Cabral). Co-directed by five filmmakers in 1976, including the four Cuban-trained videographers, uses live footage and still imagery to document the procession of Cabral's body from Conakry to Bissau, following the revolutionary's assassination. Another film of this period is Anos de oca luta (The Years of Struggle) (1978), credited to Gomes.

=== Post-independence ===
After the end of the war, Guinea-Bissau's government did not have the resources to sustain a film program, prioritizing instead other needs, such as healthcare. Post-independence Guinea-Bissau, under Amílcar Cabral's brother Luís, who was encouraged by foreign filmmaker Lennart Malmer to stimulate filmmaking in the country, steered its videographers towards the production of news programs, following the models of Cuba and Mozambique. Footage was filmed for the intended program, Jornais de Atualidades, but was never broadcast, and the filmmakers were afforded little creative control on the project. Most film shot in this period was for the Jornais de Atualidades, often of state events such as visiting politicians. In either 1977 or 1978, N'Hada co-founded the Instituto Nacional de Cinema (INC) along with Angolan Mário Pinto de Andrade. Filmmaker Chris Marker spent time with the Bissau-Guinean group of filmmakers in 1979, using footage shot by N'Hadaa in the film Sans Soleil, while Malmer procured equipment for the INC, including 16mm Arriflex cameras, lighting equipment, and a Steinbeck guitar.

Although there were movie theatres that screened mostly Portuguese, and later, non-Western films through a partnership with the Soviet Union, there is no evidence that locally produced documentary films were ever actually screened in Guinea-Bissau, other than accounts by some Bissau-Guinean filmmakers. Despite this, film production in the country remained underfunded. The filmmakers were finally given a grant in 1979 to produce Guiné-Bissau, Seis Anos Depois (Guinea-Bissau, Six Years Later), which would reflect the country's accomplishments since independence. However, production was terminated due to the 1980 Guinea-Bissau coup d'état. Many early documentaries were lost after the coup, with the surviving ones left obscure and vulnerable. João Bernardo Vieira, the new leader of the country banned the film O regresso de Amílcar Cabral, due to its propaganda value towards the previous regime.

The first Bissau-Guinean feature film was N'turrudu (1987), directed by Umban u'Kset. The same year, Flora Gomes set out to make Mortu Nega, which would become the first feature-length Bissau-Guinean fiction film, produced with the backing of the government. Gomes followed up Mortu Nega with a second feature, The Blue Eyes of Yonta (1992), which was again produced by the government, this time with the help of the Institute of Cinema of Portugal and other Portuguese backers. By 1995, the country had only produced a few more films, such as, N'Hada's Xime (1994), a Dutch and French co-production which debuted at Cannes and Gomes' A Mascara (1993). The Instituto Nacional de Cinema began working with the Ministry of Education to increase the capability of Guinea-Bissau to produce and distribute films. Gomes released Po di Sangui in 1996 and Nha Fala in 2002.
