= Kuukua Eshun =

Ghanaian film director

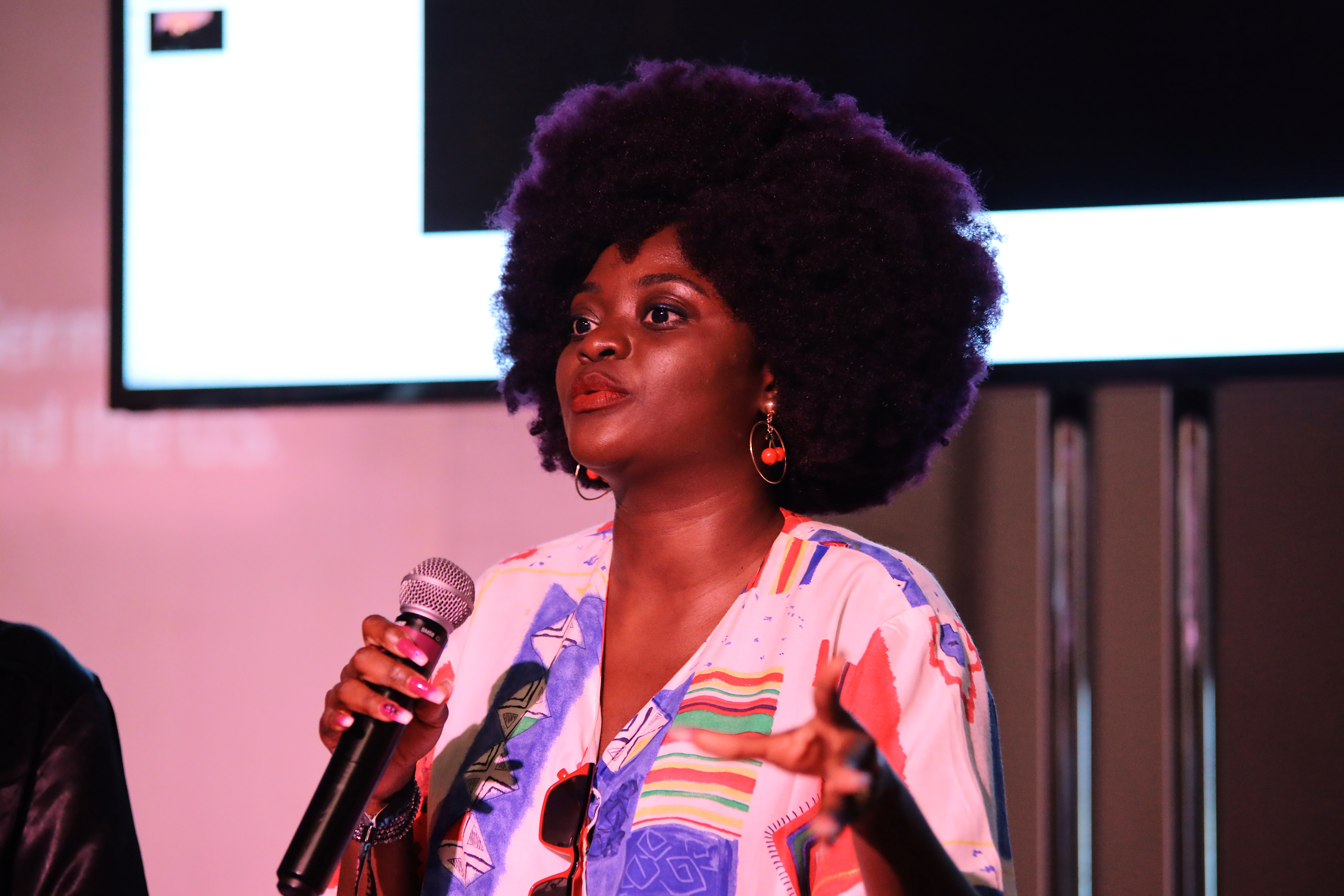
- Kuukua Eshun speaking at re:publica on Sequencer Tour in Detroit
- Born: Kuukua Eshun; Accra, Ghana
- Other name: Kuuksss
- Occupations: Film director, writer and creative
- Known for: Film directing and poetry

Kuukua Eshun is a Ghanaian-American film director, artist and writer. Kuukua raises awareness about social issues and mental health through her writing and film. She is the co-founder of Boxedkids.

== Early life and education ==
Kuukua was born in Accra on 18 May 1994 but hails from Aburi in the Eastern Region of Ghana. She attended Columbus State Community College where she studied Art and Science.

== Career ==
Kuukua's first film titled Artist, Act of Love won an award at the worldwide women's films festival for best visual effect. She is the co-founder of Skate Gal Club. Kuukua believes in gender equity which has pushed her to protest a lot on the streets of Accra. She collaborated with UNFPA Ghana to hold a healing session for young women who are survivors of sexual assault.

Kuukua recently worked with Nigerian musician Wizkid where she directed a performance for him.

Kuukua got her recent documentary film "Unveiling" premiered at the Museum Ostwall Im Dortmunder U in Germany and its showing in the museum till March 2022. The film was commissioned by the ANO Institute of Arts & Knowledge and produced and directed by Kuukua.

Kuukua also directed Nigerian Musician Wizkid's short film for his Made In Lagos album titled Made In Lagos Deluxe Film which was released in December 2021. She co-directed this short film with Wizkid.

== Filmography ==
Short films

Year	Title	Director	Writer	Producer	Ref.
2018	Stranger To Your Seed	Yes	Yes	Yes	
2019	Artist, Act Of Love	Yes	Yes	Yes	
2021	Unveiling	Yes	Yes	Yes	
2021	Made In Lagos (Deluxe)	Yes	Yes	Yes	

== Awards and recognition ==
- Urbanworld Film Festival Finalists for Young Creators Showcase.

Year	Event	Prize	Recipient	Result
2021	2021 Ghana Movie Awards	Best Documentary	Unveiling	Nominated
