= Laval Decree =

The Laval Decree was a law controlling content of motion pictures filmed in French African colonies. It was used to prevent African filmmakers from filming in Africa.

== History ==
In 1934, the French government passed the Laval Decree to prevent cinema from spreading subversive or anti-colonial messages. It was written by Pierre Laval, who later became the Vichy France minister of colonies. The decree stated that "any person who desire to make cinematographic images or sound recordings must address a written request to the lieutenant Governor of the colony where the applicant intends to operate".

The request included all the information about the applicant's professional references, scripts for film or musical accompaniment (for slides). The Decree restricted the work of both African and European filmmakers, from 1934 until it was overturned in 1960.

The decree required the French government's permission to shoot and show films in French colonies and banned colonized people from filming themselves. In 1960 when colonies became independent the decree ended.
