= Anne Mungai =

Kenyan film director (born 1957, died 2025)

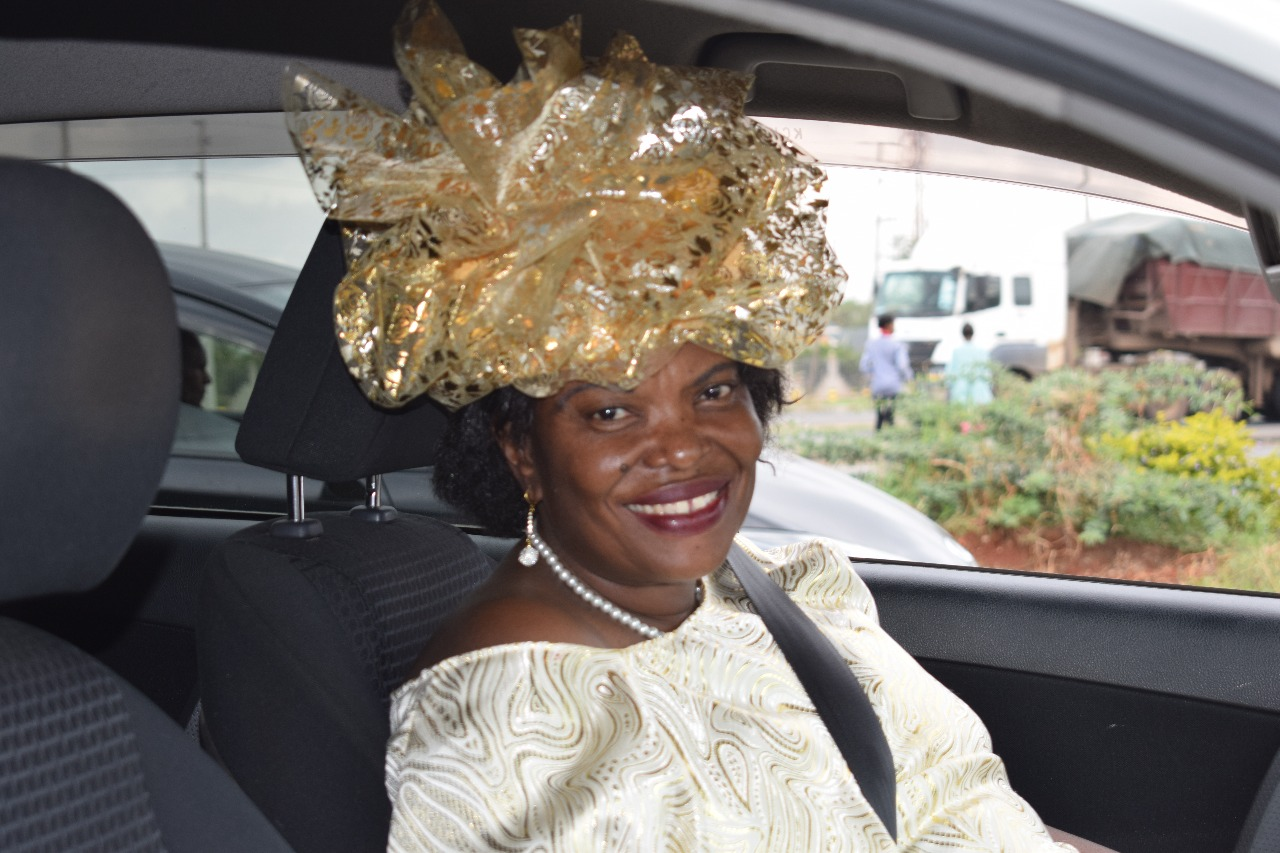
- Citizenship: Kenyan
- Occupation: Film Director
- Years active: 1980-2025
- Known for: exploring the stories of young African women and the challenges they face while navigating post-colonial Africa.
- Notable work: Saïkati

Dr. Anne G. Mungai (born 1957) was a Kenyan film director. She is best known for her feature length film, Saikati (1992). She is known for exploring the stories of young African women and the challenges they face while navigating post-colonial Africa.

== Life ==
Anne Mungai graduated from the Kenya Institute for Mass Communications and went on to work there. She is the founder-director of the Shangilia Street Children's Theatre.

In 1993 Mungai co-founded Women in Cinema in Kenya, affiliated with African Women in Film and Video as the provisional committee of its Kenya section. She died on 24 October 2025 at the Kenyatta University Teaching, Referral and Research Hospital (KUTRRH), where she was receiving treatment. Following her death, colleagues and students at Kenyatta University expressed their condolences and paid tribute to her academic legacy.

== Directorial career ==
Anne Mungai’s directing career began in 1980 with her first short entitled Nkomani Clinic. Since then, she has directed many short- and medium-length films, as well as her first feature film Saïkati. This film, like many of Mungai’s works, focuses on a female character living in Africa during a time that is split between traditional African cultural practices and those brought over from the Western world during colonization.

== Saikati (1992) ==
Saikati was funded by the Kenya Institute of Mass Communication, as Mungai was an alumnus of the school, with the equipment being provided by the Fredrick Engel Foundation. The script was work-shopped at the Institute with help from a script consultant. Mungai and the script consultant, however, did not have the same vision for Saikati during the writing process, meaning Mungai did not have full creative license of the film. Some of the scenes added to the film went against Mungai’s wishes for the cultural content and story that she had in mind, though Mungai still succeeded in getting the main message across to her audience. The film looks at topics surrounding the challenges women face because of the urbanization of Kenya: how difficult it is to navigate the rural-urban drift of the country while also working to discover who they are in terms of their education, beliefs, and sexuality and how they fit into post-colonial Africa. Saikati looks at these topics from an intersectional point of view. (i.e. through depictions of class, gender, sexuality, age, and ethnicity)

=== Plot ===
The film depicts a young woman named Saikati who is conflicted between wanting to attend university to get an education in the city and following her parents' wishes of her marrying the Chief’s son, which her family has already arranged. Ultimately, she decides to run away from traditional life she once knew and goes to live with her cousin Monica in the city. Monica says she can help Saikati get a job so she can afford to go to school. Once Saikati arrives in the city, however, she realizes that her cousin is a prostitute and the job she has lined up for her is in the same profession. Saikati finds herself caught “between two evils: forced marriage and prostitution.” Saikati realizes that although she wants to run away from forced marriage, she does not want to lose the cultural practices she left behind in the Maasai “Maara.” She decides the culture she left behind is still part of who she is, even though she would like to get an education.

== Filmography ==
Film	Year
Nkomani Clinic	1980
The Beggar’s Husband	1980
The Tomorrow’s Adult Citizens	1981
Together We Build	1982
Wekesa at Crossroads	1986
Productive Farmlands	1990
Faith	1991
Root 1	1991
Saikati (online)	1993
Pongezi	1993
Usilie Mtoto wa Africa/Don't Cry Child of Afrika	1994
Tough Choices	1998
Saikati The Enkabaani	1998
Promise of Love	2000

== Awards ==
Year	Award	Type of Award
1993	FESPACO – UNICEF	Award for best projection of an African woman's image
1993	APAC	Association of Professional in Communication Award for best African Woman Director – Burkina Faso
1994	HEAD OF STATE COMMENDATION AWARD (H.S.C)	n/a
1994	M-NET	Special merit award
1995	FESPACO	Best Video Documentary Award
1996	Chile Embassy	Gabriella Mistral Award
1999	PLAN INTERNATIONAL	Director's Film Award (For Saikati)
1999	Zanzibar International Film Festival	Special Jury Director's Award
2022	Women in Film Awards	Most Influential Woman Personality
