= Clarence Thomas Delgado =

Senegalese film director, screenwriter and film producer

- Born: 9 August 1953 (age 73); Dakar, Senegal
- Occupations: Film director, film producer, screenwriter, camera operator and actor
- Writing career
- Notable works: Movies Niiwam (1988), L'appel des arènes (2005), and Que le Père soit (2021).

Clarence Thomas Delgado (born in Dakar in 1953) is a Senegalese film director, film producer, screenwriter and camera operator.

== Biography ==
Delgado was born in Dakar to a family originating in Cape Verde and went to primary and secondary school in Dakar. He joined his uncle first in Switzerland and later in Portugal, where his uncle was Senegalese ambassador. Delgado then worked as a camera operator at the Algerian Radio Television Center (Radiodiffusion-télévision algérienne, RTA) in 1977 and studied directing and production at the Portuguese Cinema Institute in Lisbon. After returning to Senegal, he assisted Paulin Soumanou Vieyra making his movie En résidence surveillé (Under house arrest, 1981).

Later, Delgado was assistant director for several short and feature films, including Camp de Thiaroye (Ousmane Sembène, 1987), Les Caprices d'un rivière (Bernard Giraudeau, 1996) and Moolaadé (Ousmane Sembène, 2004), and produced L'Appel des arènes (Cheikh Ndiaye, 2005). He wrote the scenario and directed his feature film Niiwam (1988), an adaptation of a short story by Ousmane Sembène, which was awarded the OCIC Award at the 1991 Amiens International Film Festival. Clarence Delgado was a president of the Cinéastes Sénégalais Associés organisation (Associated Senegalese Filmmakers, CINESEAS).

== Filmography ==
Delgado's films include:

Year	Film	Genre	Role	Duration (min)
1981	En résidence surveillée by Paulin Soumanou Vieyra	Political fiction feature film	Assistant	100 m
1987	Camp de Thiaroye by Ousmane Sembène	Historical drama feature	Assistant Director	157 m
1988	Niiwam	Drama fiction feature, adaptation of a short story by Ousmane Sembène	Director, screenwriter	88 m
1996	Les Caprices d'un fleuve by Bernard Giraudeau	Historical drama feature	Assistant director	111 m
1997	TGV by Moussa Touré	Comedy drama feature	Actor	90 m
1999	Héroïsme au quotidien by Ousmane Sembène	Drama short	Assistant director	
2002	Fatima, l'Algérienne de Dakar by Med Hondo	Drama fiction feature	Co-producer	89 or 93 m
2004	Moolaadé by Ousmane Sembène	Drama fiction feature	Assistant director	120 m
2005	L'Appel des arènes by Cheikh Ndiaye	Drama fiction feature, adaptation of the novel by Aminata Sow Fall	Assistant director, co-screenwriter, co-producer	105 m
2012	Moi Zaphira ! by Apolline Traoré	Drama fiction feature	Assistant director	102 m
2015	Lune est tombée (La) by Gahité Fofana	Drama fiction feature	Assistant director	77 m
2021	Que le Père soit	Drama fiction feature	Director	110 m

== Award ==
Film	Festival	Award
Niiwam	Amiens International Film Festival (FIFAM)	1991 Winner OCIC Award (SIGNIS)

== See also ==
- Cinema of Senegal

== Bibliography ==
- Pfaff, Françoise (2010). "Clarence Delgado". A l'écoute du cinéma sénégalais. Collection images plurielles (in French). Paris: Éditions L'Harmattan. pp. 99–108. ISBN 9782296103528. OCLC 795438372. Short biography and an interview with Delgado.
