= List of Democratic Republic of the Congo films =

A partial List of Democratic Republic of the Congo films follows:

Title	Year	Director	Genre	Notes
Afro@Digital	2002	Balufu Bakupa-Kanyinda	Documentary	
Benda Bilili!	2010	Renaud Barret and Florent de La Tullaye	Documentary	
Congo in Four Acts	2010	Dieudo Hamadi, Divita Wa Lusala, Kiripi Katembo	Documentary	
Congo - A Political Tragedy	2018	Patrick Kabeya	Documentary	
Le Congo, quel cinéma!	2005	Guy Bomanyama-Zandu	Documentary	
Dix mille ans de cinéma	1991	Balufu Bakupa-Kanyinda	Short documentary	
Downstream to Kinshasa (En route pour le milliard)	2020	Dieudo Hamadi	Documentary	
The Draughtsmen Clash	1996	Balufu Bakupa-Kanyinda	Drama	
Entre la coupe et l'élection	2007	Guy Kabeya Muya; Monique Mbeka Phoba	Documentary	
Héritage envahi	2010	Mamadi Indoka	Thriller	
Identity Pieces (Pièces d'identités)	1998	Mwezé Ngangura	Comedy	
Jazz Mama	2009	Petna Ndaliko	Documentary	
Juju Factory	2006	Balufu Bakupa-Kanyinda	Drama	
Kafka au Congo	2010	Marlène Rabaud, Arnaud Zajtman	Documentary	
Kin Kiesse	1982	Mwezé Ngangura	Documentary	
Kinshasa Makambo	2018	Dieudo Hamadi	Documentary	
Kinshasa palace	2006	Zeka Laplaine	Drama	
Kinshasa Septembre noir	1992	Jean-Michel Kibushi	Documentary	
Ko Bongisa Mutu	2002	Claude Haffner	Documentary	
Lamokowang	2003	Petna Ndaliko	Documentary	
Lumumba. La mort d'un prophète	1991	Raoul Peck	Documentary	
Lumumba	2000	Raoul Peck	Documentary	
Macadam tribu	1996	Jose Laplaine	Comedy	
La Mémoire du Congo en péril	2005	Guy Bomanyama-Zandu	Documentary	
Mama Colonel (Maman Colonelle)	2017	Dieudo Hamadi	Documentary	
Moseka	1971	Roger Kwami Mambu Zinga	Documentary	
Muana Mboka	1999	Jean-Michel Kibushi; Ndjate Wooto	Short drama	
National Diploma (Examen d'état)	2014	Dieudo Hamadi	Documentary	
Papy	2009	Djo Tunda Wa Munga	Drama	
Paris: XY	2001	Zeka Laplaine	Drama	
Un Rêve d’indépendance	1998	Monique Mbeka Phoba	Documentary	
Rumba Rules, New Genealogies	2020	Sammy Baloji, David Nadeau-Bernatchez	Documentary	
Tango Ya Ba Wendo	1992	Roger Kwami Zinga, Mirko Popovitch	Documentary	
Town Criers (Atalaku)	2013	Dieudo Hamadi	Documentary	
La Vie est belle	1987	Mwezé Ngangura	Drama	
Viva Riva!	2010	Djo Tunda Wa Munga	Crime thriller	
We Too Walked on the Moon	2009	Balufu Bakupa-Kanyinda	Short drama	

== See also ==
- Cinema of the Democratic Republic of the Congo
