= Cinema of the Democratic Republic of the Congo =

Cinema of the Democratic Republic of the Congo (DRC; French: Cinéma de la République Démocratique du Congo) originated with educational and propaganda films during the colonial era of Belgian Congo. Development of a local film industry started after the Democratic Republic of the Congo gained its independence from Belgium in 1960, but was hampered by constant civil war.

== Colonial era (1908-1960) ==
=== Colonial cinema in the age of empire ===
According to historian Alexandre Ramos, the emergence of colonial cinema coincided with the height of European imperial expansion during the late nineteenth and early twentieth centuries, when colonialism became a subject of widespread public interest rather than one confined to political elites. The "Scramble for Africa" (c. 1881–1914), during which European powers rapidly partitioned much of the African continent among themselves, attracted considerable attention across Europe. This growing interest was encouraged by newspapers, exhibitions, advertising, literature, and other forms of popular culture, which helped increase public interest by promoting the achievements of the colonial empires.

Representations of colonized peoples and territories became a recurring feature of European cultural life. Ramos explains that newspapers often covered military campaigns, geographic discoveries, and colonial affairs, while scientific journals, travel books, novels, plays, and illustrated magazines introduced readers to Europe's overseas empires. Stories of exploration and conquest, whether based on historical events or fictional narratives, cultivated enthusiasm for overseas expansion and helped make colonial rule seem normal and acceptable. Adventure literature was one of the most popular ways these ideas reached readers. Books such as King Solomon's Mines (1885) by H. Rider Haggard, How I Found Livingstone (1872) by Henry Morton Stanley, and the Portuguese travel narrative De Angola à Contra-Costa (1886) by Hermenegildo Capelo and Roberto Ivens presented Africa as an exciting and little-known land waiting to be explored. Read by many educated Europeans, these works helped portray colonial expansion as legitimate, heroic, and civilizing.

Ramos argues that, in this cultural setting, it is not surprising that colonial themes appeared soon after cinema was invented. Early filmmakers produced films that reflected what audiences were already interested in, including stories about empire that were popular in books and newspapers. Just one year after the first public film screening, La Sortie de l'usine Lumière à Lyon (1895), the Lumière brothers commissioned their first moving images filmed in a colonial territory, Alger: déchargement au port (1896), which was filmed by Alexandre Promio in French Algeria. This became one of the earliest examples of filmmaking in a colonial setting and began a long tradition of portraying colonial life and imperial power on screen. Colonial subjects remained common in cinema throughout the twentieth century and continued into the twenty-first century. Even after the end of colonial rule, films such as Gandhi (1982), Out of Africa (1985), and Tabu (2012) continued to explore colonial history and its legacy.

Although Belgium controlled a large colonial territory in Africa through the Belgian Congo, Ruanda-Urundi, and the Lado Enclave, it was not one of the leading European colonial powers. Compared with countries such as Britain, France, and Germany, Belgium had a smaller population, a weaker military, and less political influence. Because of this, the Belgian government depended more on diplomacy and forms of cultural propaganda, including cinema, to justify, promote, and maintain their colonial possessions.

=== Development of Belgian colonial cinema ===
==== Congo Free State under Leopold II ====
Belgium was a constitutional monarchy with a federal parliamentary system during the colonial period. Its early colonial involvement was mainly shaped by the personal initiative of King Leopold II, rather than by a strong national policy in favour of overseas expansion. Leopold II sought to establish Belgian influence in Central Africa, particularly in the Congo Basin, which led to the creation of the Congo Free State (1885–1908), a territory that was initially controlled as his personal possession rather than as a formal Belgian colony. To support his plans, Leopold II set up the Association internationale du Congo (AIC) in 1879, which replaced earlier groups such as the Comité d'études du Haut-Congo. These organizations helped fund exploration missions in the region, including those led by Henry Morton Stanley. The King also invested his personal fortune and took loans from the Belgian state, pledging his "future territories in Africa as collateral".

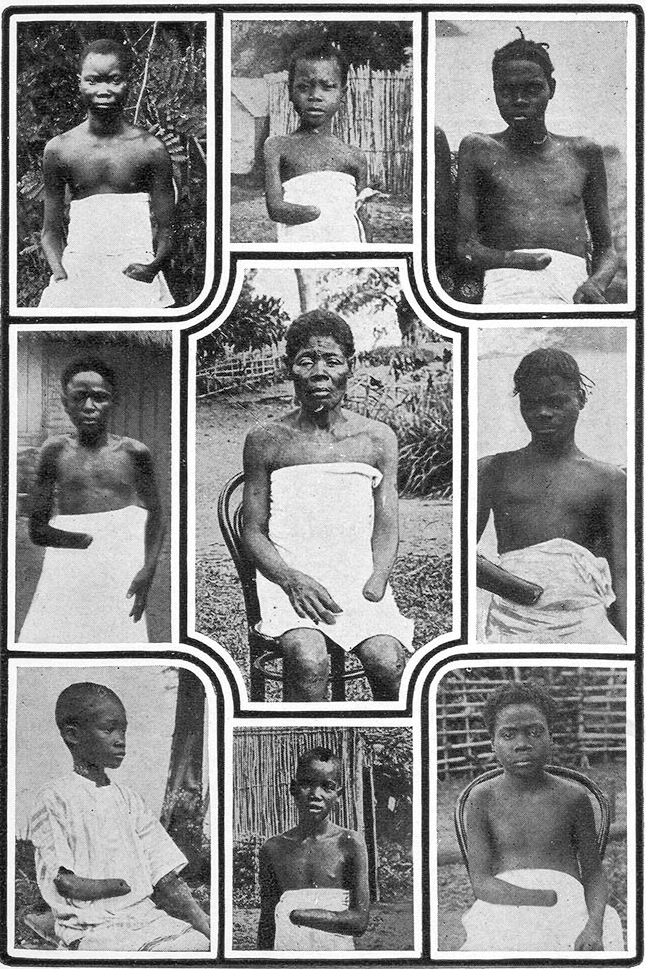
Civilian victims of mutilation by Free State authorities

At the Berlin Conference of 1884–1885, European powers officially recognized King Leopold II's control over the Congo Basin and agreed that he would personally govern the new state created under the AIC framework. The Belgian government largely accepted this arrangement, which allowed Leopold II to manage colonial affairs with minimal parliamentary oversight and without regular reporting to government ministers. By the early twentieth century, however, the Congo Free State faced growing financial problems and increasing criticism from other countries. Reports of forced labor, violence, and harsh rule led to public concern in Belgium and abroad. In 1908, the Belgian parliament voted to annex the territory, which then ended Leopold II's personal control and placed it under the Belgian state. The colony was renamed the Belgian Congo (1908–1960). In 1919, after the First World War and under the League of Nations mandate system, Belgium was given control of Ruanda-Urundi, which had been part of German East Africa. This arrangement was confirmed in 1923, and both territories remained under Belgian rule until the mid-twentieth century.

Colonial expansion was not, at first, a widely supported national policy in Belgium. Historians such as Jean Stengers point out that many sectors of Belgian society, including political and economic elites, were cautious about overseas expansion and often preferred to focus on economic growth at home. This limited interest was also seen in Belgium's neutral stance in earlier colonial issues, such as the Anglo-Portuguese Treaty of 1884, where Belgium did not formally act even though Leopold II had interests in the region. Even after the Congo Free State was annexed by Belgium, anti-colonial sentiment still existed within the country. Because of this, supporters of colonial policy, including those linked to Leopold II's earlier lobbying networks, worked to promote the benefits of empire. To gain public support and build a colonial culture in Belgium, visual media like photography and later cinema were used as propaganda tools. These media were intended to present colonial rule in a positive light and increase public acceptance of Belgium's overseas empire.

==== Cinema ====
According to Ramos, Belgian colonial cinema was shaped by three "three principles" that were commonly used to support colonialism. The first was that having a presence in Africa was important for protecting national economic and military interests. The second was the belief that Europeans had a moral duty to bring "civilisation" to Africa, which was presented as a way to improve living conditions and end practices such as slavery. The third was "proselytise, i.e., convert the populations to Christianity", mainly through Catholic missions to oppose "paganism, superstition, and the progress of Islam".

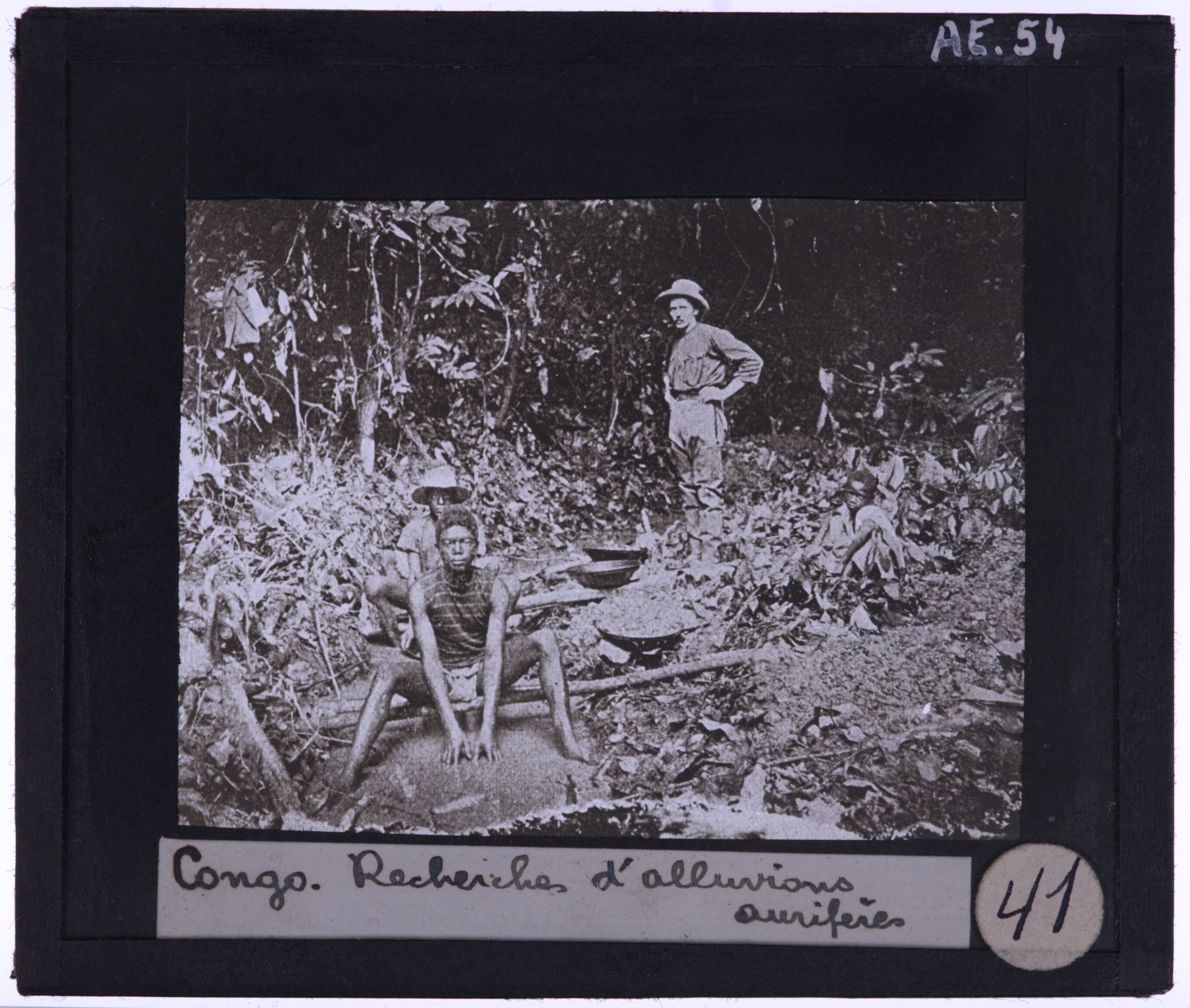
This 1913 photograph depicts aspects of labor and daily life in the Belgian Congo. It shows Congolese workers searching for gold-bearing alluvial deposits under the supervision of a European in Kanwa, located between the Aruwimi River and the Uélé River. The image originates from the publication Panorama du Congo, issued by the Touring Club de Belgique.

Because of these ideas, the Belgian state, the Catholic Church, and large companies operating in the Belgian Congo and Ruanda-Urundi funded films that promoted colonialism to audiences in Belgium and presented the colonies in a positive way to an international audience. An early film screening took place in Boma, then part of the Congo Free State, already on 25 August 1897. In 1909, around 1,000 metres of film were brought to Belgium and shown at a meeting of the Cercle africain de Bruxelles. These films, which were presented as the first moving images of the Belgian Congo, mainly focused on transport systems (such as Départ de Léopoldville à Anvers), local customs and societies (such as Les industries indigènes), and natural resources, especially mining in the Katanga region (such as Le chemin de fer de la Rhodésie).

During the early years of the Belgian Congo, many of these films were produced by foreign companies, including the Anglo-African company African World, and were made without official support from the Belgian state. This was partly because film production was expensive and because most people in Belgium were not very interested in colonial affairs. For these reasons, colonial cinema remained a small and irregular activity at first. This began to change after 1919, as during the First World War and in the years that followed, European audiences became more interested in newsreels and documentary films, especially those showing distant countries and wartime events. After the war, this interest continued, and Africa was often seen as a source of "exotic" and visually appealing content. To meet this demand and present Belgian colonial rule in a positive way, the first official film mission led by photographer Ernest Gourdinne was sent to the colonies in the final years of the war. This mission produced about 12,000 metres of film, which were later edited into 20 short documentaries released in 1919. These films were shown widely in Belgium, with more than 1,000 public screenings.

It was only in 1925 that Belgian colonial cinema began to take a clearer model, after a second filming mission was sent to Africa. In that same year, businessman William Hesketh Lever, 1st Viscount Leverhulme, financed a film about his plantations in Kwilu. This type of public-private collaboration helped shape the main direction of Belgian colonial cinema between 1908 and 1939. Films made during this time usually had two main goals: to give information about life in the colonies and to support colonial rule. These films also influenced later filmmakers working in the Belgian Congo. Ernest Genval (1884–1945) is linked to the early phase of this tradition, while André Cauvin (1907–2004) and Gérard De Boe (1904–1960) represent a later phase, mainly active between 1939 and 1960. According to Glenn Reynolds, these three filmmakers are often seen as the main figures of Belgian colonial cinema.

In the 1930s, Genval became an informal leading filmmaker in the Belgian Congo, producing around 60 films. Like William Hesketh Lever, he first worked on advertising films that promoted colonial economic activities and encouraged investment in the colony. He later shifted to documentary filmmaking while continuing to use similar themes in films like De Boma à Tshela (1926), Fonctionnement d'une bourse de travail (1926), and Or (1938). In these works, Genval presented the development of infrastructure and economic activity in the Congo as beneficial for European and black populations. His films often focused on transport systems such as railways linking agricultural estates between Boma and Tshela, where cocoa and palm oil production was shown; labor systems such as the Kasai labor exchange, where Congolese workers sought employment; and mining activities, including gold extraction along the Aruwimi River.

The second part of these films often focused on living and working conditions. For example, in Fonctionnement d'une bourse de travail, selected workers were shown receiving food and clothing and later being housed in brick buildings. Genval's work soon became more distinct in style. His later films placed greater emphasis on people rather than infrastructure or economic development, as seen in Avec les hommes de l'eau (1938), which focused on communities living from fishing and hunting along the Congo River. During the 1930s, the number of private and public film missions increased, and filmmakers became more professionally trained. At the same time, the nature of colonial cinema began to change. Most films were still documentaries, and their promotional message became increasingly visible to audiences. Because of this, companies were "forced to change their propagandistic narrative". While they continued to promote colonial development, their films became more general in tone and more ambitious in scope.

From the early years of the Belgian Congo, film missions mainly focused on promoting colonial economic activity, especially projects run by private companies, rather than showing the role of the colonial government. As a result, colonial cinema remained mainly a private rather than a state-run activity. This also meant that portrayals of the Congo still followed patterns from King Leopold II's time, when colonial rule was "subordinated to large corporations and other colonial interests". To address this, the Fonds colonial de propagande économique et sociale (FCPES) was set up in 1937, marking the first time the Belgian state, through the Ministry of Colonies, became more directly involved in producing and coordinating films. The FCPES helped manage and direct film production, which meant private companies had less control than before. Rather than competing with the state, many companies chose to cooperate in order to maintain their interests. This led to an increase in film production, along with changes in who made the films. Instead of self-taught individuals or company employees motivated by personal interest in Africa, filmmakers were now more often trained professionals selected by the state according to specific requirements.

==== 1939–1960 ====
In 1939, André Cauvin replaced Genval as the official filmmaker for the colony. His films followed new government guidelines and focused on presenting the outcomes of Belgian colonial policy in Africa, especially themes such as socioeconomic development and scientific activity in the Congo. His documentary Congo, terre d'eaux vives (1939) reflects the main style and ideas of the second phase of Belgian colonial cinema (1939–1960). It portrays both the so-called civilizing effects of colonial rule and aspects of daily life among the local population, helping to shape what is often described as Belgian colonial ideology in film.

With the start of World War II and the German invasion of Belgium, the colony became temporarily isolated and administrative centers were relocated. In Belgian Congo, Cauvin was appointed head of the Mission cinématographique by the Belgian government-in-exile in London. He was tasked with continuing film production that would show the Allies that the Belgian Congo was still contributing to the war effort, even after Belgium's military surrender in Europe. His 1942 documentary Congo, aimed at an international audience, especially in the United States, was one of the main results of this effort, and Cauvin himself presented the film to Franklin D. Roosevelt. At the same time, propaganda films were also produced for international promotion of the Belgian colonial project, such as Yangambi (1943) by Gérard De Boe, which focused on one of the colony's major agricultural estates. De Boe, the third key filmmaker of this period, had earlier made documentaries based on his experience as a health official in rural Congo. His film La Lèpre (1938) gained attention from the colonial administration, after which he was hired to produce documentary series on public health, colonial development, and the Congo's wartime contributions. During the war, he worked with the Centre d'information et de documentation du Congo belge and also created his own production company. He made nearly 70 films covering topics such as health, transport, the economy, religion, education, industry, and ethnography.

One example is Pêcheurs Wagenia (1952), which begins with images of modern Stanleyville (now Kisangani), accentuating its port, transport links, and economic role, including scenes of European passengers arriving on a Sabena flight from Brussels. The second part of the film focuses on the Wagenia fishermen, who are portrayed as skilled and resourceful while also being shown as a peaceful community and a potential attraction for tourism.

Together with Cauvin and other filmmakers, De Boe was part of the development of Belgian colonial cinema between 1939 and 1960, a period that was marked by the decentralization of film production. After World War II, the government information service moved the main film production center to Léopoldville (now Kinshasa). In the 1950s, film production and distribution expanded and reached wider audiences. During this period, colonial censors, who were increasingly concerned about anti-colonial rhetoric and resistance movements, cut scenes from commercial films and imported newsreels, including a sequence from the Laurel and Hardy comedy Sons of the Desert (1933), a swimsuit parade in a Belgavox newsreel, and footage of a prisoner-of-war exchange during the Korean War in Paramount News. Most films were documentaries that promoted the colony's economic activity, natural resources, and industry, while also recording cultural and ethnographic aspects of local communities, often presented as material to be preserved for the future. Alongside films made for Belgian and international audiences, many educational films were also produced for viewers in the Congo and Ruanda-Urundi.

After World War II, Belgian colonial filmmaking gradually adopted a somewhat more respectful portrayal of the colonized population. The creation of UNESCO and its support for greater equality and access to education in colonial territories encouraged colonial governments to place more emphasis on education and social development. In Belgium, the goal of expanding primary education also led to the use of cinema as a "didactic instrument" in this effort to "inform and educate the masses, both in the mainland and in the colonies".

As part of this effort, the colonial government in Léopoldville launched a program in 1947 to produce educational films for the black populations of the Congo and Ruanda-Urundi. These short films promoted ideas that colonial authorities considered essential, including hygiene, punctuality, and other aspects of daily life based on Western social norms. Because of the high production costs, the government sought support from other institutions. The Centre congolais d'action catholique cinématographique (CCACC), founded by Catholic missionaries in 1936, became the main producer of educational films for African audiences. Most of its documentaries were directed by lay filmmakers, while many fictional films about daily life and work were made by priests such as André Cornil and Albert Van Haelst. Usually filmed in local languages with African actors, these productions presented stories based on Christian values. One example is L'élite noire de demain (1950), which shows African students in Christian mission schools learning traditional crafts alongside Western education under white missionary teachers. The film presents education as the means through which Belgium claimed to bring civilization to the Congo. In Léopoldville, the Cinécole film club was founded to make films on Congolese subjects. Its president, Albert Mongita, co-directed La leçon de cinéma (1951).

A new direction emerged in Belgian colonial cinema in 1955. Until then, most productions had either promoted Belgian colonial rule or documented African cultures through educational and ethnographic films, often produced separately for European and African audiences. From 1955 onwards, filmmakers increasingly sought to present both communities within the same narrative. Although this approach accentuated social progress and opportunities for Africans, it also responded to growing international criticism of colonialism by portraying Belgian rule as one based on cooperation and racial harmony. A key example of this approach is Cauvin's Bwana Kitoko (1955), which was produced during the official visit of King Baudouin to the Congo and Ruanda-Urundi. The visit took place at a time of rising tensions between European and African populations, particularly over demands for equal access to education. One of the aims of the royal tour was to promote unity within the colony. Cauvin produced two versions of the event, Le Voyage royal for European audiences and Bwana Kitoko for African audiences. Instead of following the journey in chronological order, Bwana Kitoko focuses on African traditions, local ceremonies, music, landscapes, wildlife, and the "welcome protocol, and the frenzy of Africans and Europeans surrounding the King". Although the visit and the film were well received, and King Baudouin became popular among many Africans, the trip did not bring about any major political or social changes.

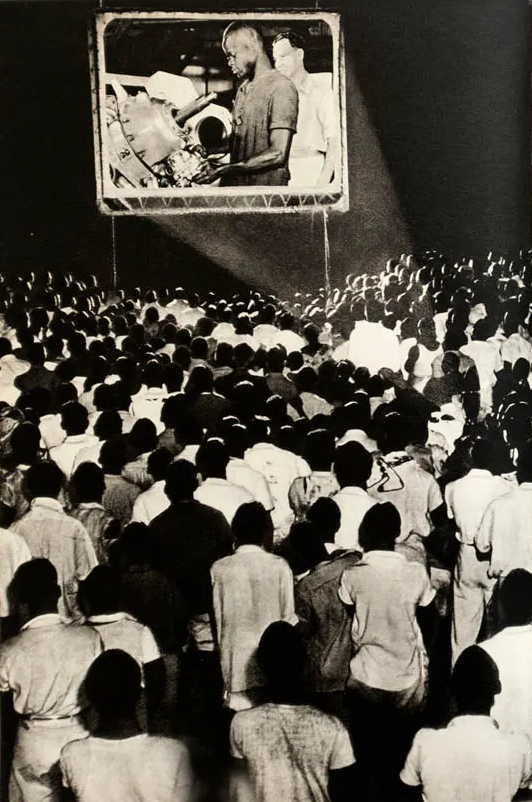
An Inforcongo photograph of one of the screenings

This approach continued after 1955, with films aimed exclusively at either European or African audiences becoming less common as colonial authorities sought to present the colony as a society based on "racial equality and peaceful coexistence". From 1956, the Office de l'information et des relations publiques pour le Congo belge et le Ruanda-Urundi (Inforcongo) regularly produced films showing Africans and Europeans studying and working together. One example is Lovanium (1958), which presents the University of Lovanium as a modern institution with advanced laboratories, libraries, and workshops. The film shows African and European students sharing classrooms, residences, dining halls, and recreational spaces. According to the narrator, this equality was possible because of "half a century of civilising initiatives in the field of education". The film also describes the university's teaching methods and learning facilities, while showing that religious and lay professors taught the students.

==== Independence ====
Between 1957 and 1958, Belgian colonial film production reached its highest level, with nearly 1,000 films made in the Congo and Ruanda-Urundi. This increase was supported by a more effective distribution network and by the 1958 Brussels World's Fair (Expo 58), where many of these films were shown in the Congo and Ruanda-Urundi pavilions. The screenings promoted a positive image of Belgian colonial rule, aiming to attract investment, boost international support for the colonial administration, and counter growing independence movements in the colonies.

One example is En cinquante ans (1958), which marked 50 years of Belgian rule in the Haut-Katanga province. The film presents the colonial administration and local companies as providing employment and social benefits to workers from Ruanda-Urundi who had migrated to work in the mines of Haut-Katanga. It shows workers arriving in Élisabethville (now Lubumbashi) and highlights the hospitals, schools, and other services available to them and their families. The documentary also includes scenes of maternity wards, religious choirs, sporting events, theatres, and public celebrations, with African participants appearing throughout the film. The film portrays the African population as supportive of Belgian rule and downplays the growing independence movement, but despite these efforts to promote Belgian colonialism through film, negotiations between the Belgian government and independence movements led to the independence of the Belgian Congo in 1960, followed by the independence of Ruanda-Urundi in 1962.

==== Censorship ====
The colonial administration censored films in the Belgian Congo from 1917 until independence in 1960. In 1936, a separate censorship board was established for films shown to Congolese audiences. The commission could refuse a film, require cuts, or approve it for particular groups of viewers. Some films were approved for film clubs and study circles while remaining unavailable to general Congolese audiences. Censorship decisions reflected concerns about public order, morality, religion, and the reputation of Europeans. Censors intervened in both feature films and newsreels, cutting out material that ranged from scenes of sexual intimacy to footage of strikes and armed resistance. The commission also restricted films whose portrayal of race relations or life in Europe challenged colonial hierarchies. Beginning in 1956, Congolese members of the commission included, among others, filmmaker Albert Mongita and future President Joseph Kasa-Vubu. In their study of cuts made between 1952 and 1956, film historians Engelart Willems and Daniël Biltereyst found that censors repeatedly removed footage of collective protests and scenes that highlighted Europe’s vulnerability. The cuts affected coverage of events outside the colony, including the Algerian War and the conflict in Indochina.

== Post-independence ==
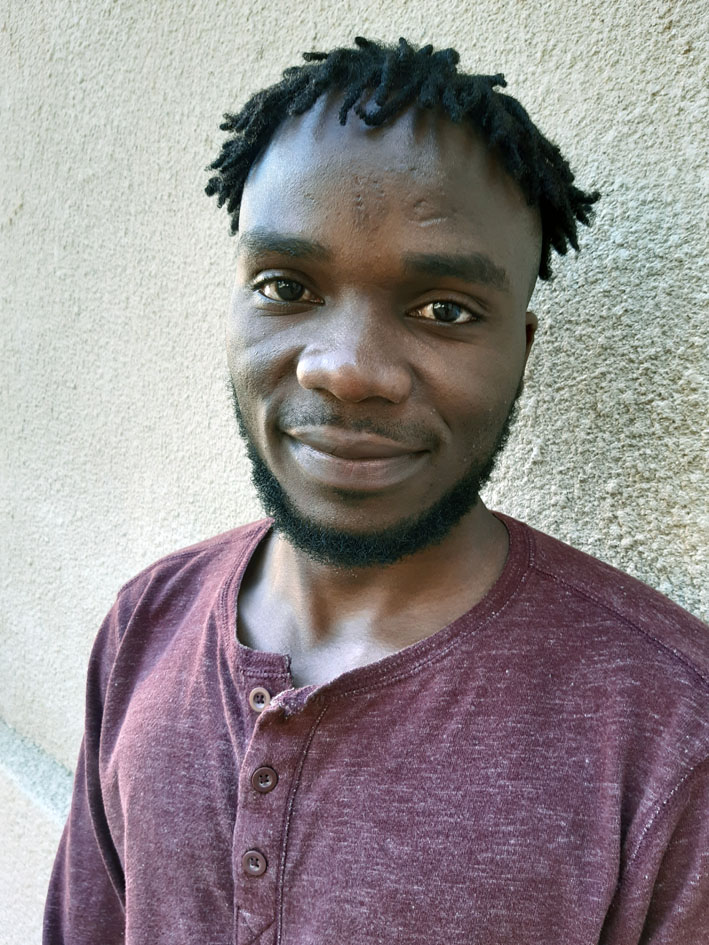
DR Congolese screenwriter and film director Maisha Maene at the Festival des Cinémas d'Afrique du pays d'Apt, France, 2023.

Following Congo's independence from Belgium in 1960, the country experienced a series of civil wars that largely destroyed the nascent film industry. Foreign support has allowed some directors to create movies in the DRC, notably from the French ministry of foreign affairs. The DRC government has shown interest in assisting the development of a local film industry. Almost all DRC filmmakers live and work abroad.

Mwezé Ngangura is among the best known Congolese directors of his generation. Following his first short film Tamtam électronique (Electronic Tamtam) in 1973 he directed the shorts Chéri-Samba (1980) a portrait of the now world famous painter, and Kin Kiesse (1982) about the Congolese city of Kinshasa that would inspire his award-winning first feature, La Vie est Belle in 1987. His Identity Pieces, a musical comedy, won the Stallion de Yennenga at the Panafrican Film and Television Festival of Ouagadougou in 1999.

Raoul Peck, a Haitian who was brought up in Zaire, directed the documentary Lumumba. La mort d'un prophète (1991), about the life of Patrice Lumumba, who led the country into independence. Kibushi N'djate Wooto produced the animated short Crapaud chez ses beaux-parents in 1992, with French funding. In his film Procès Mbako, Anioto Homme Léopard Mythe et Réalité, Kibushi combined animation, re-enactments and interviews to examine the colonial-era trial of Mbako in the Belgian Congo.

In 1994 Josef Kumbela made the short Perle noire (Black Pearl), which he followed with a series of other short films. Jose Laplaine's comic drama Macadam Tribu (Macadam Tribe) (1996) made fun of the constant quest for money, status and sex in Africa's urban neighborhoods. Petna Ndaliko is an internationally acclaimed filmmaker and activist who founded and directs the Yole!Africa cultural center and the Salaam Kivu International Film Festival (SKIFF). SKIFF, the first film festival in the DRC, brought together over 15,000 people in a span of ten days. The festival screens international and local cinema, and has an open-air concert and numerous dance competitions. In 2014 SKIFF celebrated its 10th anniversary. However, as recorded in Guy Bomanyama-Zandu's 2005 documentary Le Congo, quel cinéma!, local productions today have difficulty making money. The film follows three Congolese technicians (Claude Mukendi, Pierre Mieko, and Paul Manvidia-Clarr) and Ferdinand Kanza, a director who made films in the 1970s and now works at the National Radio Television of Congo. Another 2005 documentary by the same director, La Mémoire du Congo en péril (The Momory of Congo in Danger), describes the Congolese Film Library. The library owns thousands of films that form part of the history of Congolese cinema, some dating as far back as 1935. They are in extremely poor condition and in danger of being lost.

In 2009 the United Nations High Commissioner for Refugees was using the cinema to break taboos on discussing rape, which was commonplace during the civil wars. The documentary Breaking the Silence covers sexual violence and abuse of women, topics that most people are reluctant to discuss. It was made by IF Productions of the Netherlands and is being screened by a mobile cinema operated by Search for Common Ground (SFCG), a US-based NGO. Screenings are often open-air, with power provided by a generator. Nonetheless, in 2015 the DRC government, cancelled scheduled screenings of Thierry Michel's L'homme qui répare les femmes (The Man Who Repairs Women) about Dr Denis Mukwege, a Nobel nominee who treats survivors of rape, torture and mutilation in the violence against women that has been endemic to Congolese civil wars. Lambert Mende, the DRC communications minister, said the film made “unjustified attacks” on soldiers.

Filmmaker Balufu Bakupa-Kanyinda helped organize the first Semaine du film congolais (Sefico) festival in May 2011 at Le Zoo, a cultural center. In July 2001 Bakupa-Kanyinda announced at the Festival du cinéma africain in Khouribga that he intended to acquire four cinemas in Kinshasa. He was looking for partners to help acquire the cinemas to serve Kinshasa, a city with ten million inhabitants but no cinemas at all. The industry was given a sobriquet of CongoFilmz to help brand Congolese cinema and promote it further worldwide.

== See also ==
- List of Democratic Republic of the Congo films
- Media of the Democratic Republic of the Congo
- Cinema of Africa
