= Binger Filmlab =

Coordinates: 52.3775°N 4.895°E

Binger Filmlab, formerly the Maurits Binger Film Institute, is an Amsterdam-based international feature-film and documentary development centre where screenwriters, directors, producers and script editors from around the world can be coached and supported by mentors and advisors.

Binger opened its doors in 1996 as a post-academic training facility for film professionals. Its venue is situated at Arie Biemondstraat 111 in Amsterdam. Presently all activities are on hold.

== Notable filmmakers and producers ==
- Michaël R. Roskam
- Nicolas Provost

== Notable projects ==
Related to, or developed at Binger Filmlab:

- Bends by Flora Lau (Hong Kong). Selected to compete in Un Certain Regard at the 2013 Cannes Film Festival. Cinematography by Christopher Doyle and editing by Binger-alumnus Alexis Dos Santos.
- Salvo by Fabio Grassadonia & Antonio Piazza (Italy). Opening film La Semaine de la Critique at the 2013 Cannes Film Festival, competing in its Feature Film section.
- We Are What We Are by Jim Mickle, produced by Rodrigo Bellott (Bolivia). Screened at Sundance Film Festival 2013, selected for the Directors' Fortnight programme of the 2013 Cannes Film Festival.
- A Fold in my Blanket by Zaza Rusadze (Georgia). Opening Film, Panorama Program of Berlin International Film Festival, 2013. The film will also screen at the 37th Hong Kong International Film Festival March 31, 2013.
- The Resurrection of a Bastard by Guido van Driel (Netherlands). Opening Film International Film Festival Rotterdam, 2013, 2013.
- Devastated by Love by Ari Deedler (Netherlands). World Premiere in the 'Bright Future' section of International Film Festival Rotterdam, 2013.
- Shell by Scott Graham (United Kingdom) - 'Best Film' and winner of the FIPRESCI Prize, Torino Film Festival, 2012.
- Bullhead (film) by Michaël R. Roskam (Belgium) - World Premiere Berlin International Film Festival, 2011. 'New Authors Audience Award' and the 'New Authors Critic's Prize for Best Actor' (Matthias Schoenaerts) AFI Fest. 'Best Film Award' at the Ostend Film Festival, nine Magritte Award nominations and it went on to win 'Best Flemish Coproduction', 'Best Screenplay', 'Best Actor' and 'Best Editing.'. Oscar Nomination 'Best Foreign Language Film' at the 84th Academy Awards, 2012. 'Best Debut' Montreal World Film Festival.
- Maori Boy Genius by Pietra Brettkelly (New Zealand) - World Premiere Berlin International Film Festival, 2012. 'Best Documentary' New Zealand Film Awards, 2012. Selected Sydney Film Festival, 2012.
- Allez, Eddy! by Gert Embrechts (Belgium) - 'Best Film' 'Best Child Actor,' SCHLINGEL International Film Festival, 2012. 'Audience Favourite' Palm Springs International Film Festival, 2013.
- Milo by Roel Boorsma and Berend Boorsma (Netherlands) - 'CGS Award for creativity and originality' Giffoni Film Festival, 2012. 'Moviesquad Cinekid Award', Cinekid Festival, 2012.
- The Bastard Sings the Sweetest Song by Christy Garland (Canada) - World Premiere Hot Docs Canadian International Documentary Festival, 2012. 'Best Caribbean Film by an International Filmmaker' Trinidad and Tobago Film Festival, 2012.
- Leones by Jazmín López (Argentina) - World Premiere Venice Film Festival, 2012. Won Special Jury Prize at Buenos Aires International Festival of Independent Cinema. Selected at International Film Festival Rotterdam, 2013.
- The Invader (2011 film) by Nicolas Provost (Belgium). 'Best New Director' Seattle International Film Festival 2011, 'Best Director' Geneva Film Festival. World Premiere Venice Film Festival, 2012. Selected Toronto International Film Festival, 2011, Ostend Film Festival 2011, with 8 nominations, San Sebastian Film Festival 2011, Festival do Rio 2011, Nouveau Cinéma 2011, Ghent International Film Festival 2011, Geneva Film Festival 2011, American Film Institute Festival 2011, Palm Springs International Film Festival 2012, Rotterdam International Film Festival 2011, Edinburgh Film Festival 2012, Atlanta Film Festival 2012.
- Best Intentions by Adrian Sitaru (Romania). 'Best Director' Locarno International Film Festival 2011. CICAE Art Cinema Award, 2011 at Kaunas International Film Festival, 2012.
- Rey by Niles Attalah (Chile) and Lucie Kalmar (France). Development Award Torino Filmlab, 2011. Production Award Torino Filmlab, 2012 of €70,000. Selected Cinéfondation programme of the 2013 Cannes Film Festival.
- Agua Fria de Mar/Cold Water by the Sea by Paz Fabrega (Costa Rica). Winner of the VPRO Tiger Competition International Film Festival Rotterdam, 2010. 'Best Film' 'Lima Latin American Film Festival', 2010. Finalist of the prestigious Sundance / NHK International Filmmakers Award, 2008. Awarded a Production Award to the value of €120,000 by Torino Filmlab. The film was also awarded the Arte Award at the Buenos Aires Lab.
- A Song of Good by Gregory King (Germany). 'Best Film' New Zealand Film Awards 2008. World Premiere International Film Festival Rotterdam, 2008. A total of 8 festival selections.
