= Dieudonné Kabongo =

Congolese-Belgian comedian, humorist, musician and actor

- Born: 1950; Katanga, Belgian Congo (now Democratic Republic of the Congo)
- Died: 11 October 2011 (aged 60–61); Jette, Brussels, Belgium
- Occupations: Comedian, humorist, musician, actor
- Known for: First widely known Belgian comedian of African descent; role in Lumumba
- Awards: First Prize, Festival International du Rire de Rochefort (1984); Lifetime Achievement Award, Africa Filmfestival (2010); Magritte Award nomination

Dieudonné Kabongo (1950 – 11 October 2011) was a Congolese-born Belgian comedian, humorist, musician, and actor. Kabongo co-starred in the 2000 film, Lumumba, portraying Godefroid Munongo. He was the first comedian of African descent to achieve widespread popularity in Belgium.

== Biography ==
Kabongo was born in 1950 in Katanga, Belgian Congo, which is now the Democratic Republic of Congo. He immigrated to Belgium in 1970. He originally studied electromechanical engineering in Virton, Belgium, before embarking on a self-apprenticeship in theater and writing.

In 1984, Kabongo and fellow actor Mirko Popovitch jointly won the First Prize at the Festival International du Rire de Rochefort. His film credits included Identity Pieces in 1998, the 2000 film Lumumba, directed by Raoul Peck, and the 2005 film, Le Couperet, directed by Costa-Gavras. He was awarded the lifetime achievement award by the Africa Filmfestival in 2010. For his role in The Invader, he received a Magritte Award nomination for Best Supporting Actor.

Kabongo collapsed and died during a performance on stage at a cultural center in Jette, a district of Brussels, on 11 October 2011, at the age of 61.
