= Inforcongo =

The Office de l'Information et des Relations Publique pour le Congo Belge et le Ruanda-Urundi lit. 'Office of Information and Public Relations for the Belgian Congo and Ruanda-Urundi', commonly known as Inforcongo or InforCongo, was a government information agency active in the Belgian Congo until its independence. Established in 1955 by the Ministry of the Colonies, it succeeded the Centre d'Information et de Documentation du Congo Belge et du Ruanda-Urundi.

Inforcongo employed photographers and filmmakers including Joseph Makula (who worked for Congopresse, its Léopoldville branch), Carlo Lamote, and Henri Goldstein. Its purpose was to portray Belgian colonial governance in a favorable light. The agency maintained an image library in Brussels, while Congopresse archived and distributed the same photographs and information within the colony. The low cost of Inforcongo's photographs and film clips discouraged newspapers from sending their own photographers into the colonies, as doing so would have been far more expensive. Even the socialist and anti-colonial newspaper Le Peuple made use of material produced by the agency.
