= Mamadi Indoka =

Congolese screenwriter (born 1976)

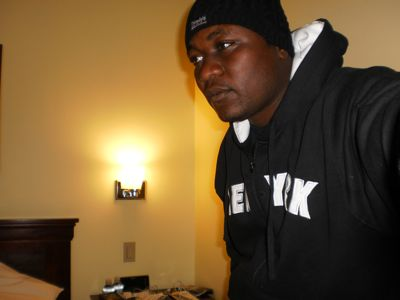
- Mamadi Indoka
- Born: 1976 (age 49–50); Kinshasa, Democratic Republic of the Congo
- Occupations: Director and screenwriter

Mamadi Indoka is a Congolese director and screenwriter born 7 November 1976 in Kinshasa (Democratic Republic of the Congo).

== Biography ==
Indoka first encountered the world of cinema in 2002 with a short film shown in Madrid and decided to take up the practice of the seventh art. He studied cinema in Canada and the United States, where he became a director and screenwriter.

In 2005, he wrote and directed his first short, Une nuit d'enfer (A Night of Hell). In 2006, he wrote and directed another short, La Beauté de la mort (The Beauty of Death), then, in 2007, directed his first full-length feature, 32 ans après (32 Years After), written by Sebastiao Ndombasi. This film told the story of a man who returns to Angola 32 years after having fled war there, and is treated like a foreigner.

In 2008, he wrote and directed the documentary La Pêche artisanale (Artisanal Fishing), and in 2010, he directed two shorts: Le Sida (AIDS), written by Lionel Mwedi Malila, and Victime (Victim) which he wrote himself. In 2010 he filmed his second full-length feature, L'héritage envahi (The Invaded Heritage), written and directed by Mamadi Indoka with the support of Congo Films Productions, his production company. This second feature told the story of a heinous crime, an entire family murdered by a trusted bodyguard, who spared only an infant. He abandoned the child in a forest, certain it would die of natural causes. But years later the child, now a grown man, sets outs out to seek revenge. This may have been the earliest Congolese thriller, since it came out a year before Viva Riva!.

== Filmography ==
=== Director and screenwriter ===
- 2005 : Une nuit d'enfer, (A Night of Hell) (short)
- 2006 : La Beauté de la mort (The Beauty of Death) (short)
- 2007 : 32 ans après (32 Years After) (feature)
- 2008 : La Pêche artisanale (Artisanal Fishing) (documentary)
- 2010 : Le Sida (AIDS) (short)
- 2010 : Victime (Victim) (short)
- 2010 : Héritage envahi (Invaded Heritage) (feature), with Junior Lusaulu, Roch Bodo Bokabela, Annie Lukayisu, Elombe Sukari, Sarah Musau
- 2011 : Kuluna (Kuluna) (short)
- 2013 : Une vie de souffrance (A Life of Suffering) (documentary)
- 2014 : Mokili (Mokili) (short)

== See also ==
- Cinema of Africa
- List of African films
- Cinema of the Democratic Republic of the Congo
- List of Democratic Republic of the Congo films
