= War on Screen =

Annual film festival

War on screen Festival international de cinéma
- Location: Châlons-en-Champagne, France
- Founded: 2013
- Founded by: Philippe Bachman, La Comète - Scène nationale de Châlons-en-Champagne
- Language: French; English
- Website: https://waronscreen.com/

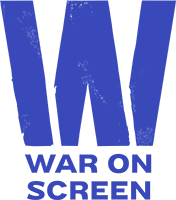
War on Screen logo

The International Film Festival War on Screen (WoS) is an annual French film festival focusing on representations of conflicts in all genres of cinema and animated image. It was established in 2013 and is held each year in October at Châlons-en-Champagne, France.

Over the years various theater, film and music professionals have contributed to the festival, including actor and producer Olivier Broche, actor, film director and screenwriter Albert Dupontel, film director and writer Bertrand Blier, French-Afghan writer and filmmaker Atiq Rahimi, English writer-director Mike Leigh, French director, screenwriter, actor and producer Bertrand Tavernier, French composer, saxophonist, and clarinetist Michel Portal, and French film director, screenwriter and producer Jean-Jacques Annaud.

WoS Fabrique is an associated programme for film students to stimulate screen writing, production and direction of films on conflicts, by courses and subsidies for five laureates. It is supported by La Fémis (France), Konrad Wolf Film University of Babelsberg (Germany), Łódź Film School (Poland), ECAM (Spain), and Caragiale National University of Theatre and Film (Romania).

== Awards ==
The official French award names are Grand prix du Jury, Mention spéciale du Jury, Prix de la mise en scène, Prix du Public, Prix du meilleur court métrage, and Prix du Jury étudiant.

Year	International Jury Grand Prize	International Jury Distinction	International Jury Best Director Award	Audience Award	Best Short Film Award	High School/Student Jury Distinction
2013	Rose by Wojciech Smarzowski (Poland)	Camp 14 - Total control Zone by Marc Wiese (Germany)	Omar by Hany Abu-Assad (Palestine)	Camp 14 - Total control Zone by Marc Wiese	Machsom by Joel Novoa (USA)	-
2014	Tangerines by Zaza Urushadze (Estonia/Georgia)	Canopy by Aaron Wilson (en, Australia/Singapore)	Boys of Abu Ghraib by Luke Moran (USA)	-	Habana by Edouard Salier (France)	-
2015	Soleil de plomb (Zvizdan) by Dalibor Matanic (Croatia/Serbia/Slovenia)	À peine j'ouvre les yeux by Leyla Bouzid (France/Tunisia/Belgium)	Son of Saul by Laszlo Nemes (Hungary)	Censored Voices by Mor Loushy (Israel/Germany)	Bendito Machine V - Pull the trigger by Jessie Malis Alvarez (Spain)	-
2016	Fuocoammare, par-delà Lampedusa by Gianfranco Rosi (France/Italy)	A Good Wife (Dobra zena) by Mirjana Karanovic (Serbia /Bosnia-Herzegovina/Croatia)	Tombé du ciel by Wissam Charaf (Libanon/France)	Les Oubliés by Martin Zandvliet (Germany/Denmark)	No news from home by Patrick Zocco (France)	Les Oubliés by Martin Zandvliet (Germany/Denmark)
2017	Last Men in Aleppo by Feras Fayyad (Denmark/Syria)	To the actor Meinhard Neumann for the film Western by Valeska Grisebach (Germany/Bulgaria/Austria)	Women of the Weeping River by Sheron Dayoc (Philippines/France)	The Yellow Birds by Alexandre Moors (USA)	Battalion to my beat by Eimi Imanishi (USA)	Meteor Street by Aline Fischer (Germany)
2018	Chris The Swiss by Anja Kofmel (Switzerland/Germany/Croatia/Finland)	Los Silencios by Beatriz Seigner (Brasil/Colombia/ France)	Cold War by Pawel Pawlikowski (Poland/UK/France)	Funan by Denis Do (France/Belgium/Luxembourg/Cambodia)	Animal by Jules Janaud et Fabrice Le Nezet (France)	Los Silencios by Beatriz Seigner (Brasil/Colombia/ France)
2019	Pour Sama by Waad al-Khateab and Edward Watts (UK)	Monos by Beatriz Seigner (Colombia)	Papicha by Mounia Meddour (Algeria/France/Belgium)	Pour Sama by Waad al-Khateab and Edward Watts (UK)	-	Papicha by Mounia Meddour (Algeria/France/Belgium)
2020	The Flying Circus by Fatos Berisha (Kosovo)	Les Leçons persanes by Vadim Prelman (Russia/Germany/Belarus)	La Toile de l'Araignée by Andrès Wood (Chile)	Les Leçons persanes by Vadim Prelman (Russia/Germany/Belarus)	-	1982 by Oualid Mouaness (Libanon/France/Norway/Qatar)
2021	En Route pour le Milliard (Downstream to Kinshasa) by Dieudo Hamadi (France/Congo/Belgium)	Olga by Elie Grappe (Switzerland/France/Ukraine)	-	L'homme qui a vendu sa peau (The Man Who Sold His Skin) by Kaouther Ben Hania (Tunisia/France/Belgium/Sweden/Germany)	-	Et il y eut un matin (Let It Be Morning) by Eran Kolirin (Israel/France)
2022	Natural Light by Dénes Nagy (Hungary/Latvia/France/Germany)	Marin des montagnes by Karim Aïnouz (Brazil/France/Germany/Algeria)	-	Amira by Mohamed Diab (Egypte/Jordan/United Arab Emirates/Saudi Arabia)	-	Butterfly Vision by Maksym Nakonechny (Ukraine/Croatia/Sweden)
2023	In the Rearview (Skad dokad) by Maciek Hamela (Poland/France/Ukraine)	Fremont by Babak Jalali (USA)	-	Goodbye Julia by Mohamed Kordofani (Sudan/Egypt/Germany/France/Saudi Arabia/Sweden)	The Record by Jonathan Laskar (Switzerland)	Heroic by David Zonana (Mexico/Sweden)
2024	The Village Next to Paradise by Mo Harawe (Austria/France/Somalia)	Intercepted by Oksana Karpovych (Canada/France/Ukraine)	-	Rabia by Mareike Engelhardt (France)	Moeder by Salomon Ligthelm (Ukraine)	Flavors of Iraq by Feurat Alani and Léonard Cohen (France/Iraq)
