= N'Diagne Adechoubou =

Beninese film director and producer (born 1959)

- Born: November 7, 1959 (age 66)
- Citizenship: Beninese
- Occupations: Film Director and Producer

N'Diagne Adechoubou (born November 7, 1959) is a Beninese film director and producer.

== Life ==
N'Diagne Adechoubou was born on 7 November 1959. He is manager of Akangbe Productions, established in 1992.

In the 1980s Adechoubou travelled to Cuba to film a documentary about the Afro-Cuban painter Manuel Mendive, tracing the elements of Yoruba culture which had travelled to Cuba with African slaves. His documentary on the Autonomous Port of Cotonou, produced in France in the early 1990s, emphasised the port's dynamism.

Adechoubou has worked as producer and cinematographer on several films directed by the Congolese filmmaker Balufu Bakupa-Kanyinda. He was producer for Afro@Digital, a documentary exploring how digital technologies are being used in Africa.

== Filmography ==
As director

- Le Pont-Neuf en scene. Documentary.
- Psychose d’amour et de guerre [Psychosis of love and war]. Documentary.
- Manuel Mendive ou l'esprit pictural yoruba [Manuel Mendive or the Yoruba pictorial spirit]. Short documentary, 1987.
- Port Autonome de Cotonou [Autonomous Port of Cotonou]. Medium-length documentary, 1993.
- Zinsou, le grand témoin [Zinsou, the great witness]. Feature-length documentary, 2013.

As producer

- Watt. Short film directed by Balufu Bakupa-Kanyinda, 1999.
- Article 15 bis. Short film directed by Balufu Bakupa-Kanyinda, 2000.
- Afro@Digital. Medium-length documentary directed by Balufu Bakupa-Kanyinda, 2002.
- Juju Factory. Feature-length film directed by Balufu Bakupa-Kanyinda, 2005.
