= Mirko Popovitch =

Belgian filmmaker

- Born: Mirko Dragolioub Popovich; 1948 (age 77–78); Brussels, Belgium
- Occupations: Director, producer, screenwriter
- Years active: 1991–present

Mirko Dragolioub Popovich (born 1948), is a Belgian filmmaker. He is best known as the director of critically acclaimed film Tango Ya Ba Wendo.

== Personal life ==
He was born in 1948 in Brussels, Belgium and is of Yugoslav descent.

== Career ==
He is the founder and CEO of the 'Zinneke Parade' located in Brussels. In 1993, he made the documentary short Tango Ya Ba Wendo along with Roger Kwami Zinga of the Democratic Republic of Congo. The short deals with the life of the pioneer of modern Zairian music, Wendo, also known as Papa Wendo. From 1966 to 1980, Popovitch worked as a musician in rock groups. He continued to work as the managing director of the Watermael–Boitsfort Cultural Center for 28 years. In 1997, he became the events commissioner for Na Nga Def Senegal, where he later worked for Laafi Burkina Faso in 1999 and Alafia Benin in 2004.

Apart from cinema, he is also a prolific author. In 2004, he wrote and published short stories which won the First Francité Prize in 2004 and then won RTBF Fureur de lire 2004 prize. In 2008, he was elected as the Director of the non-profit organization Africalia, in which he continued to work for 7 years and then retired on 1 January 2013. With all the experience obtained during these years, he launched a production line of documentaries made by African filmmakers on cultural subjects.

== Filmography ==
Year	Film	Role	Genre	Ref.
1978	Magnum Begynasium Bruxellense	Camera operator	Documentary	
1979	Symphonie (Soliloque)	Cinematographer	Short film	
1993	Tango Ya Ba Wendo	Director	Documentary	
2012	Mavambu	Director, cinematographer, writer	Documentary short	

== See also ==
- Dieudonné Kabongo
