= Djo Tunda Wa Munga =

Congolese film director and producer (born 1972)

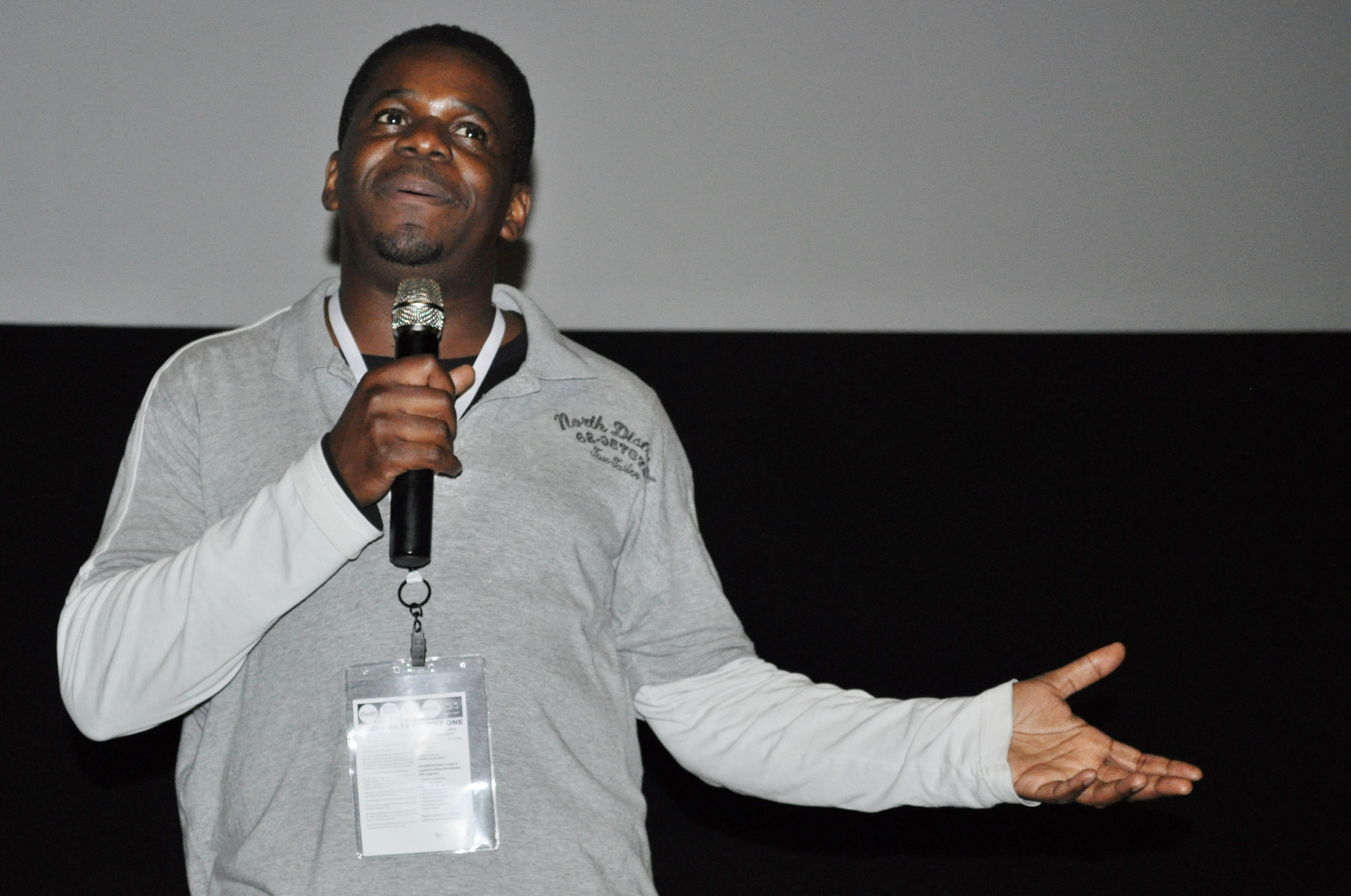
- Djo Tunda Wa Munga speaking at the Seattle International Film Festival, Seattle, Washington
- Born: 1972 (age 53–54); Kinshasa, Zaire
- Occupations: Director, Producer
- Notable work: Viva Riva!
- Awards: Best Director at the Africa Movie Academy Awards in 2011

Djo Tunda Wa Munga (born 1972) also known as Djo Munga, is a Congolese film director and producer. He is best known for his award-winning 2010 thriller Viva Riva!, the first feature film to be produced in the Democratic Republic of the Congo in over 28 years.

== Early life and education ==
Djo Munga was born in 1972 in Kinshasa, in the Democratic Republic of the Congo, then called Zaire. At age nine he moved to Belgium where he attended a catholic boarding school at College St. Augustine for five years. He then attended a fine Arts school in Brussels before enrolling in INSAS, the national film school of Belgium, in 1993.

== Career ==
Munga returned to Kinshasa to start a career as a filmmaker in 1997 when Mobutu Sese Seko's dictatorship ended. His plans were upended when the Second Congo War broke out in 1998, forcing him to take on a variety of jobs beyond filmmaking while traveling back and forth between Belgium and the DRC for the following several years.

In 2002 Munga got his first notable break in the film business as a production manager on the BBC documentary television series Congo: White King, Red Rubber and Black Death about King Leopold II of Belgium's brutal reign over the Congo Free State. Work on other television documentaries followed including as a line producer on the DRTV2 2004 production of The Danish Congo Adventure which chronicled the role of Danish seamen in Belgium's colonization of the Congo. In 2005 he served as assistant director on Cuba, an African Odyssey about Cuba's support for various African revolutions.

In 2005, Munga directed his first solo documentary, Horizon en Transition, which follows the political transition in the DRC after decades of dictatorship and five years of war.

In 2006, he co-founded Suka! Productions with South African producer Steven Markovitz with offices in Kinshasa and Cape Town. It was the first production company to be established in the DRC. Under the Suka! banner Munga directed the 2009 television feature, Papy, about a man struggling with the personal and professional fallout of being afflicted by HIV/AIDS. The film was part of a multi-institutional led effort to build awareness among Congolese on how to prevent the disease.

Other productions followed including the 2010 Congo in Four Acts, a documentary Munga produced and directed by fellow countrymen Dieudo Hamadi, Kiripi Katembo, Divita Wa Lusala, and Patrick Ken Kalala showing different aspects of life and society in Kinshasa. Critically acclaimed, the film became the first Congolese production to premiere at the Berlin International Film Festival, and screened at over 50 film festivals. That same year he released State of Mind (2010), a documentary he directed which addressed reconciliation and healing in the DRC following decades of violence and unrest.

Munga capped 2010 with the international premier of his first feature film,Via Riva!, at the Toronto International Film Festival. He wrote, directed and produced the thriller, a gritty portrayal of life in Kinshasa that became an international critical and commercial success. It went on to receive 12 nominations and win 6 awards, including for Best Director, at the 7th Africa Movie Academy Awards. It also won Best African Movie at the 2011 MTV Movie Awards. In 2011 the film opened in 18 countries throughout Africa, an unusually wide release for an African film.

In the director notes for the film Munga stated: "In making Viva Riva! I wanted to find a new way to talk about life in Kinshasa today - to describe how my hometown works and how it doesn't work. I also felt the time was right to depict aspects of life in the capital that everyone knows exist but no one has ever talked about publicly."

He was named African trailblazer at the 2010 MIPCOM, the international forum for documentary screenings.

=== Kinshasa film training program 2008-2015 ===
In 2008 Munga started a series of training initiatives overseen by Suka! in collaboration with INSAS, the national film school of Belgium, and with the support of the King Baudouin Foundation and other funders. Following the success of the first three years (2008–11) the program expanded to incorporate more students and lengthier training sessions that lasted 11 months. The program became institutionalized in Les Ateliers Actions de Kinshasa, the DRC's first film and television school. However, training was ultimately suspended in 2015 due to political turmoil in the country, lack of funding, and lack of support from Congolese institutions.

A 2020 report by the King Badouin Foundation on the impact of the training found that the increase in film production in Kinshasa over the previous decade could be directly connected to the impact that the production and release of Congo in 4 Acts and Viva Riva!, two Suka! productions, as well as Rebelle (2012) and Kinshasa Kids (2012)—all which involved a large number of students from Suka/INSAS training, including three of the directors of Congo in 4 Acts. According to Congolese film professionals interviewed for the report, the success and global recognition of these films inspired a new generation of emerging Congolese filmmakers. The report also found that there was hardly a film set at in Kinshasa in which it was estimated that at least half of the people involved hadn't participated in the Suka/INSAS training program. One filmmaker and producer was quoted as saying that “90% of film projects that take place in Kinshasa today see the participation of people who attended the trainings organized by Suka".
