= Kinshasa Symphony =

- German poster
- Directed by: Claus Wischmann; Martin Baer
- Screenplay by: Claus Wischmann
- Produced by: Sounding Images GmbH Westdeutscher Rundfunk Rundfunk Berlin-Brandenburg
- Cinematography: Martin Baer Michael Dreyer
- Edited by: Peter Klum
- Music by: Jan Tilman Schade
- Release dates: March 12, 2010 (The Look of the Sound); September 23, 2010 (Germany)
- Running time: 95 minutes
- Country: Germany

Kinshasa Symphony is a German 2010 documentary film.

== Synopsis ==
Kinshasa, the capital of the Democratic Republic of the Congo, is the third-largest city in Africa with 10 million inhabitants. The film shows how some people living there have managed to forge one of the most complex systems of human cooperation ever invented: a symphony orchestra (Orchestre Symphonique Kimbanguiste) performing composers such as Handel, Verdi, Beethoven. "Kinshasa Symphony" shows Kinshasa in all its diversity, speed, colour, vitality and energy. It is a film about the Congo, about the people of Kinshasa and about music.

== Awards ==
- New York City 2010
- Vancouver 2010
- Rhode Island 2010

== See also ==
- Congo in Four Acts, a documentary anthology film featuring music from the Kinshasa Symphony
