= Kiripi Katembo =

- Born: June 20, 1979; Goma, Zaire
- Died: August 5, 2015 (aged 36)
- Education: Académie des Beaux-Arts
- Occupations: photographer, documentary filmmaker and painter.

Kiripi Katembo, also known as Kiripi Katembo Siku, (June 20, 1979 – August 5, 2015) was a Congolese photographer, documentary filmmaker and painter. Katembo's short films, photography and other projects focused on the daily lives of the people of Kinshasa, as well as the economic and social challenges facing the Democratic Republic of the Congo. He was also a founding director of Mutotu Productions, his film production company, and the executive director of Yango Biennale, based in Kinshasa.

== Personal life ==
Katembo was born on June 20, 1979, in Goma, Zaire (present-day Democratic Republic of the Congo). He attended the Académie des Beaux-Arts in Kinshasa.

== Photography ==
Katembo, a noted Congolese photographer, was best known for his series, Un regard, released in 2009. The exhibition used a photography technique called mirroring. In Un regard, Katembo photographed his subjects by capturing their reflections in puddles of water found on the streets of Kinshasa. Katembo explained his goals for Un regard in an interview, "Photography also provides a way of seeing beyond reflection as it opens up a poetic window on another world, the world in which I live. I want each image to tell of the children born here who have to grow up surrounded by pools of water, and of the families who survive while others leave to live in exile. To me, this is one way of campaigning for a healthier environment and to denounce through images what Kinshasa's inhabitants see as fate."

In a 2015 interview with Jenny Stevens of The Guardian, Katembo also explained that the Congolese, including Kinshasaians, don't usually like having the picture taken, noting that a photographer usually has to ask permission. It was one of then reasons Kitembo used the mirroring of puddles in Un regard, saying "That's why I started shooting reflections – it was a way to document people going about their lives."

Katembo's work has been featured at Bamako Encounters, the Royal Museum for Central Africa, the Centre for Fine Arts, Brussels, and the TAZ in Ostend, Belgium. Photos from Un regard collection were on display as part of the "Beauté Congo – 1926–2015 – Congo Kitoko" exhibition at the Foundation Cartier in Paris at the time of his death in 2015.

He also designed the official poster for the 67th Festival d'Avignon in 2013.

== Art ==
He was the founder of Yebela, an art collective in Kinshasa.

== Film ==
Katembo filmed his 2008 seven-minute, digital short film, Cardboard Car Film, which explores Kinshasa and its people, on a mobile phone.

He established the Mutotu Productions and served as the company's founding director. Under Katembo, Mutotu Productions produced Atalaku, directed by Dieudo Hamadi, which won best documentary film at the Centre Georges Pompidou's Cinema du Reel festival in 2013. He also partnered with Hamadi and Divita Wa Lusala to co-direct the 2010 documentary, Congo in Four Acts, which won awards at the Africa Movie Academy Awards and the Cinéma du Réel film festival in 2010.

Katembo had also worked in feature films. He was assistant director on the 2010 Congolese crime thriller, Viva Riva!, which was directed by Djo Tunda Wa Munga. Katembo was also an assistant director the Canadian drama, War Witch (2012), directed by Kim Nguyen. War Witch received a nomination for Best Foreign Language Film category at the 85th Academy Awards.

Katembo's films have been shown at the Berlin International Film Festival, the Carthage Film Festival, the International Documentary Film Festival Amsterdam, and the Toronto International Film Festival. In addition to his work as a filmmaker, he was also the executive director of the Yango Biennale, a film festival held in Kinshasa.

== Death ==
Kiripi Katembo died from cerebral malaria in Kinshasa on August 5, 2015, at the age of 36.

== See also ==
- Christophe Madihano
- Joseph Makula
