= Claude Haffner =

French–Congolese filmmaker

- كلود هافنر
- Born: 1976 (age 49–50); Kinshasa, Congo Republic
- Education: University of Strasbourg; Sorbonne University
- Occupations: Director, production manager, screen writer, actress
- Years active: 2000–present
- Parents: Pierre Haffner (father); Sudila Mwembe (mother)
- Relatives: Frédéric Haffner (brother)

Claude Haffner (Arabic: كلود هافنر; born 1976), is a French-Congolese filmmaker and production manager primarily direct documentary films. She has made several critically acclaimed documentaries including Ko Bongisa Mutu, Défilé Célianthe and Noire ici, blanche là-bas.

== Personal life ==
She was born in 1976 in Kinshasa, Democratic Republic of the Congo to a French father and a Congolese mother. Her father Pierre Haffner is also a researcher and film lecturer at the French Cultural Center in Kinshasa, which influence Claude to start her cinema career. Her mother Sudila Mwembe is from Zaïre (today's Democratic Republic of the Congo). At the very young age, she went France with family and never returned Congo. Then she grew up in Alsace with her brother Frédéric Haffner. His father has a collection of African art together with photos and taped accounts about Congo and Africa. He died in 2000, where Claude decided to return to Congo with her mother to meet her Congolese family.

From 1994 to 1999, she studied History and a University Diploma in Cinema and Audiovisual at the University of Strasbourg. In 2005, Claude completed her master's degree at Sorbonne University.

== Career ==
After graduating from university, she worked on numerous short films to learn techniques of filmmaking. In 2000, Claude worked as the Script supervisor for the short film La fourchette. Then she joined as a production assistant at 'Canal +', where she was able to work with Agnès Varda, her "mentor", on the editing of the film Les Glaneurs et la Glaneuse. After the film, she developed interest to direct documentaries. Therefore, in 2002, she followed a training course in documentary filmmaking at Altermédia (Saint-Denis training center). During this period, she interviewed her mother who lived in Brunstatt about her country, her family and her history.

In 2002, Haffner studied documentary filmmaking at the Altermedia School in Paris. Her maiden direction was a "film-essay" titled Ko Bongisa Mutu in a Congolese hair salon in Paris. In 2004, she directed the documentary La Canne musicale, a promenade with the French filmmaker and ethnographer Jean Rouch. This was happened a few days before his death.

In 2005, After two years of research on African Cinema, she made the documentary D'une fleur double et de 4000 autres which was focused on African Cinema history. After the film, she moved to South Africa in the same year. In 2009, she worked as a production manager and researcher on the docu-drama The Manuscripts of Timbuktu by Zola Maseko and By Any Means Necessary by Ramadan Suleman. Claude continued to work and teach on African Cinema at two Johannesburg-based film schools: AFDA, The School for the Creative Economy (AFDA) and Big Fish School of Digital Filmmaking. In 2011, she returned to France to achieve her documentary Noire ici, blanche là-bas.

== Filmography ==
Year	Film	Role	Genre	Ref.
2000	La fourchette (The fork)	Script supervisor	short film	
2002	Ko Bongisa Mutu (Arrange Your Head)	Director, writer	documentary	
2000	À fleur de peau (On edge)	Continuity supervisor	short film	
2003	Remue-ménage dans le tertiaire (A stir in the tertiary sector)	Director, writer	documentary	
2004	La parole est une fenêtre (The word is a window)	Director, writer	documentary	
2004	Défilé Célianthe (Célianthe parade)	Director, writer	documentary	
2004	La Canne musicale (The Musical Cane)	Director, writer	documentary	
2005	D’une fleur double et de quatre mille autres (Of a Double-Headed Flower and 4,000)	Director, writer	documentary	
2005	En prépa (In preparation)	Director, writer	documentary	
2009	The Manuscripts of Timbuktu	Production manager	docu-drama	
2009	By Any Means Necessary	Production manager	docu-drama	
2010	Ce soir (ou jamais!) (Tonight or never!)	Actor: Self	TV series	
2011	Noire ici, blanche là-bas (Footprints of My Other)	Director, writer	documentary	
