= Home Sweet Home (1973 film) =

- Theatrical release poster
- Directed by: Benoît Lamy
- Written by: Rudolph Pauli; Benoît Lamy
- Produced by: Jacqueline Pierreux; Jacques Perrin
- Starring: Claude Jade; Jacques Perrin
- Cinematography: Michel Baudour
- Release date: July 1973
- Running time: 91 minutes
- Countries: Belgium; France
- Language: French

Home Sweet Home is a 1973 Belgian/French comedy film directed by Benoît Lamy, starring Claude Jade, Jacques Perrin, Marcel Josz, Ann Petersen, Jacques Lippe, Elise Mertens and Jane Meuris. It was entered into the 8th Moscow International Film Festival where it won a Diploma.

== Plot ==
It all began on the day when a new boarder, Flore (Jane Meuris), arrived on the scene. Flore considers the home as a hotel. Jules (Marcel Josz), surprised by her comes to life. And disaster follows... The management steps in: Claire (Claude Jade), the nurse has a love-affair, Jacques (Jacques Perrin), the social worker, highly regarded by the old folks, is sacked. Now the town, which has a stake in the home, takes drastic measures: the chief of police (Jacques Lippe) assists the manager (Ann Petersen) with loving care. Home Sainte-Marguerite is running amok. It all happens in a flash: the mutiny, the fire on the fourth floor, the fire brigade, the panic.

The protagonists of this film are elderly people who live in an old folks home in Brussels where daily living is dictated by militarist rules and where they are treated with condescension, and are there even humiliated as disobedient children. Claire, a beautiful and hard nurse is a young woman under the influence of the director, who does not dare say what she thinks, and the rules applies. Gradually, thanks to welfare Jacques, Claire realises, that old people the right have to live and independent to believe in that Home.

== Cast ==
- Claude Jade as Mademoiselle Claire
- Jacques Perrin as Jacques, l'assistant social
- Ann Petersen as Yvonne, la directrice de la maison de retraite
- Marcel Josz as Jules Claes
- Jane Meuris as Flore
- Elise Mertens as Anna Van Grammelaer
- Jacques Lippe as Le commissaire de police
- Andrée Garnier as Cora
- Dynma Appelmans as Marguerite Van Der Plats
- Henriette Lambeau as Annette Poels
- Josée Gelman as Simone

== About the movie ==
The film's working title was Traité de savoir-vivre à l’usage des vieilles générations (Treatise on Good Manners for the Use of Older Generations). It was the feature debut of 27-year-old director Benoît Lamy, who managed to reach a wide audience with this unconventional, socially critical topic by using a humorous approach. Lead actor and co-producer Jacques Perrin later attributed the film's immense success to finding the right tone, stating that any difficult subject can reach the general public if given the appropriate cinematic form.

The production deliberately contrasted its two young stars, Claude Jade and Jacques Perrin, with an ensemble consisting mostly of elderly non-professional actors, whom Lamy recruited at a Brussels tea dance (thé dansant).

In a key scene, Lamy breaks with cinematic convention: instead of quiet background music, a dramatic, revolutionary theme accompanies Claire's march through the dining room. Paired with a menacing tracking shot, the music builds to a powerful crescendo and stops abruptly when she halts, radically illustrating Claire's inner struggle for authority and the shifting power dynamics in the room.

The direction avoids a sentimental or pitying depiction of the elderly. Instead of passive victims, the residents are portrayed as autonomous individuals demanding dignity and respect. Their revolt is not merely a protest over food rations, but an active struggle against daily contempt and disenfranchisement. The film draws on anti-authoritarian themes previously established in Jean Vigo's Zéro de conduite (1933), applying the spirit of the 1968 movement to the older generation.

The film celebrated its world premiere at the 1973 Moscow International Film Festival, followed by theatrical releases in France and Belgium in early 1974. It has continued to screen at film festivals, including the 2025 Film Heritage Festival (Filmerbe-Festival) in Berlin. In June 2026, the film was made available for streaming on the Arte platform, offered with English subtitles .

== Critics and Awards ==
Critics praise the film as a successful blend of humorous entertainment and profound social commentary that addresses the societal dilemmas of the elderly without false pity. Writing for Écran 75, critic Guy Hennebelle drew parallels to classic revolutionary cinema, noting that Lamy discreetly introduces a revolutionary element that "slowly builds into a metaphorical image of universal revolution," comparing its momentum triggered by a minor incident to Battleship Potemkin.

The Lexikon des internationalen Films (International Film Lexicon) evaluated the work as a "debut film that skillfully combines entertainment and social criticism, as ironic and cheerful in style as it is original in its subject matter."

Benoît Lamy's feature debut won a total of fourteen awards across several international film festivals, including Montreal, Moscow, Cannes, and Tehran. Among its honors were the Best Director award in Budapest and the Special Jury Prize at the Moscow International Film Festival.
