= Orchestre Symphonique Kimbanguiste =

Congolese orchestra based in Kinshasa

The Orchestre Symphonique Kimbanguiste (OSK), or Kimbanguist Symphony Orchestra, is a Congolese orchestra based in Kinshasa, Democratic Republic of the Congo. For many years, the OSK was the only orchestra known to reside in Central Africa, though in recent times, the Kaposoka Orchestra began performing in Angola.

== History ==
Conductor Armand Diangienda founded the orchestra in 1994 after losing his job as an airline pilot, naming it after his grandfather, religious leader Simon Kimbangu. At its conception, the group had only twelve amateur musicians that shared instruments and often used common materials as makeshift instrument parts. The group eventually grew to the size of about 200 amateur musicians and performers consisting of a full orchestra and choir.

The orchestra gained international attention when German filmmakers Martin Baer and Claus Wischmann created the documentary Kinshasa Symphony (2010) depicting the plight of the orchestra and its members in poverty stricken Kinshasa.

In May 2013 it was announced that Diangienda was to become an honorary member of the Royal Philharmonic Society, an award previously bestowed on such famous musicians as Mendelssohn, Rossini, Wagner, Brahms and Stravinsky.

== International Recognition and Support ==
The OSK has also been recognized internationally for its artistic achievements. As part of the Printemps des Arts de Monte-Carlo festival, the orchestra was invited to perform in Monaco on April 6, 2013. Despite operating without subsidies and in a country with limited resources, the OSK has demonstrated perseverance. Musicians have had to improvise with materials like bicycle brake cables to replace strings.

The Monaco concert was a resounding success, and in recognition of their efforts, H.R.H. the Princess of Hanover gifted the orchestra a harp, an instrument they could not afford on their own. The musicians of the Orchestre Philharmonique de Monte-Carlo, moved by the OSK's determination, hosted a dinner in their honor, strengthening international ties for future collaborations. Following this event, the OSK performed in Kinshasa on June 7, 2013, attended by the Princess of Hanover and festival director Mr. Monnet.

The collaboration between Monegasque institutions and the OSK has continued, with the Rainier III Academy of Music providing training for OSK musicians in both 2014 and 2015. On April 1, 2017, the partnership between Monaco and Kinshasa deepened further, as the OSK joined the Orchestre Philharmonique de Monte-Carlo for a Beethoven concert at the Rainier III Auditorium.

In 2019, the Printemps des Arts festival launched a crowdfunding campaign to support the OSK, funding instrumental training, new instruments, and the deployment of a technician from the Prince Rainier III Academy to Kinshasa to enhance local instrument maintenance skills. These initiatives have strengthened the OSK's sustainability and expanded its impact on the African classical music scene.

== Collaborations and Milestones ==
The OSK has collaborated with renowned musicians, including Spanish classical guitarist Rafael Serrallet. On November 26, 2022, the orchestra achieved a historic milestone by performing Joaquín Rodrigo’s Concierto de Aranjuez. This marked the first time a Central African orchestra had ever performed this iconic piece, demonstrating the OSK's growing artistic capabilities and significance on the global classical music stage.

Their performances continue to bridge cultural and musical boundaries, bringing classical music to new audiences.
