= Roger Kwami Zinga =

Congolese film director (1943–2004)

- Roger Kwami with Monique Mbeka Phoba (left)
- Born: Roger Kwami Mambu Zinga; 1943
- Died: 22 February 2004 (aged 60–61); Kinshasa
- Occupation: Filmmaker
- Known for: Moseka

Roger Kwami Mambu Zinga (1943 – 22 February 2004) was a filmmaker in the Democratic Republic of the Congo (DRC).

== Early life and education ==
Roger Kwami Mambu Zinga was born in 1953.

He studied film at the Institut des arts de diffusion (IAD) at Louvain-la-Neuve, Belgium, graduating in 1971.

== Career ==
A year after graduating, Zinga made the first Congolese film to win an award in an international festival; his Moseka won the prize for short film at FESPACO 1972. This movie shows the return of the native son to the DRC after studying in Belgium and adjusting to his new life back in Zaire.

He co-directed Tango ya ba Wendo (1993) with the Belgian documentary-maker Mirko Popovitch. This film documents the elder and talented Congolese musician Wendo Kolossoy, considered to be the "father of Congolese music".

=== Libanga ===
For almost two decades Kwami tried to make Libanga, a feature film, but conditions in Zaire did not make this possible. However, he directed several other films.

== Death ==
At the time of his death Zinga held the position of director of cinematography for television. He was also the president of the Congolese Association of Filmmakers, and an active member of the Pan African Federation of Filmmakers (Fepaci), for which he was the Regional Secretary for Central Africa.

He died on 22 February 2004 in Kinshasa.
