= Kinshasa Makambo =

2018 Democratic Republic of the Congo film

- Directed by: Dieudo Hamadi
- Written by: Dieudo Hamadi
- Produced by: Frédéric Féraud; Dieudo Hamadi; Quentin Laurent
- Cinematography: Dieudo Hamadi
- Edited by: Hélène Ballis
- Production company: Les Productions de l'Oeil Sauvage
- Distributed by: ArtMattan Productions
- Release date: February 18, 2018 (Berlin)
- Running time: 90 minutes
- Countries: Democratic Republic of the Congo; France; Switzerland; Germany; Qatar; Norway
- Languages: Lingala; French

Kinshasa Makambo is a documentary film from the Democratic Republic of the Congo, directed by Dieudo Hamadi and released in 2018. The film centres on three young Congolese democracy activists who were involved in the 2016 protests against president Joseph Kabila.

The film premiered on February 18, 2018, at the 68th Berlin International Film Festival. The film won the Tim Hetherington Award at the 2018 Sheffield DocFest, and the True Vision Award at the 2018 True/False Film Festival.
