= We Too Walked on the Moon =

- Directed by: Balufu Bakupa-Kanyinda
- Screenplay by: Balufu Bakupa-Kanyinda
- Produced by: Dipanda Yo!
- Starring: Jean Goubald Kalala; Dorcas Mbombo Kabongo; Jean Shaka Tshipamba; Virginie Malonda; Dominique Mpundu
- Cinematography: Olivier Pulinckx
- Edited by: Marc Recchia
- Music by: Maria Baratta
- Release date: 2009
- Running time: 16 minutes
- Countries: Algeria; Democratic Republic of the Congo

We Too Walked on the Moon (Arabic: نحن أيضا مشينا على القم) is a 2009 Algerian film directed by Balufu Bakupa-Kanyinda.

== Synopsis ==
The movie is set in 1969 in Kinshasa, Congo, amid the Apollo 11 American Moon landing on July 21 of that year. Husband and wife couple Tanga and Nika wait for Sister Mwezi to spend a "Moon" evening with Nika's brother Muntu-wa-Bantu. However, the nun does not appear. The Moon is full. Muntu-wa-Bantu holds the transistor radio up to his ear as he stares at the Moon. He wants to see the first steps of mankind on the Moon for himself, but cannot reconcile the radio commentary with what he sees. Questioning the Moon's distance from the Earth, Muntu-wa-Bantu decides that he too will walk on the Moon.
