= Avec les Hommes de l'eau =

Belgian short documentary film

- Directed by: Ernest Genval
- Edited by: Ernest Genval
- Release date: 1938
- Running time: 13 minutes
- Country: Belgium

Avec les Hommes de l'eau is a Belgian 1938 short documentary film.

== Synopsis ==
The Berwinne sails off Leopoldville (now known as Kinshasa) up the Congo River. Along the way, it stops at a small village to take on board a plentiful supply of slow-burning wood. Once loaded, the boat sails away, leaving a mesmerised local population behind on the shore. Along the route, the boat encounters canoes and "watermen" carrying out typical activities such as fishing, crocodile hunting, carving hippopotamus meat and salting it for preservation.
