= Nicolas Provost =

Belgian filmmaker and visual artist (born 1969)

- Born: 1969 (age 56–57); Ronse, Belgium
- Occupations: Film and video artist

Nicolas Provost (born 1969, Ronse, Belgium) is a Belgian filmmaker and visual artist who lives and works in New York and Brussels.

His works are in a number of collections, including The New Art Gallery Walsall and Birmingham Museum and Art Gallery, who share Storyteller (2010), SMAK Gent and the Royal Museums of Fine Arts of Belgium.

His short film Suspension received an honorable mention at the Sundance Film Festival in 2008. He has also exhibited at The San Francisco International Film Festival, CineVegas, The International Film Festival Rotterdam, The Viennale, and The Locarno Film Festival.

His first feature film, The Invader, premiered at the Venice Film Festival in 2011.

He has lived in Belgium and Norway, and as of 2013, resides in New York.

== Filmography ==
=== Shorts ===
Provost's short films include:

- 2000: Need Any Help?
- 2001: Madonna with Child
- 2003: Pommes d'amour
- 2002: I Hate This Town
- 2002: Yellow Mellow
- 2003: Bataille
- 2003: Papillon d'amour
- 2004: Oh Dear
- 2004: Exoticore
- 2006: The Divers
- 2007: Induction
- 2007: Suspension
- 2007: Gravity
- 2007: Plot Point – nominated for the European Film Academy Awards
- 2009: Long Live the New Flesh – competed at the Berlinale 2010
- 2010: Storyteller
- 2010: Abstract Action
- 2010: Stardust
- 2011: Moving Stories
- 2013: Tokyo Giants – third prize ALCINE44 European Short Film Competition.
- 2013: The Dark Galleries
- 2014: The Painters
- 2014: Illumination

=== Features ===
- 2011: The Invader
