= Tango Ya Ba Wendo =

- Directed by: Roger Kwami Zinga and Mirko Popovitch
- Screenplay by: Mirko Popovitch Kwami Zengi
- Produced by: Atelier Jeunes Cinéastes Ti Suka
- Cinematography: Jean-Louis Penez
- Edited by: Marie-Hélène Mora
- Music by: Wendo Kolosoy
- Release date: 1992
- Running time: 52 minutes
- Country: Democratic Republic of the Congo

Tango Ya Ba Wendo is a 1992 documentary film.

== Synopsis ==
Tango Ya Ba Wendo is the name given to the 40s and 50s in Kinshasa, Democratic Republic of the Congo, a time when Antoine Kolosoyi, called Wendo, the pioneer of Zairian rumba, triumphed. In 1992, Wendo is almost 70 years old. The old singer and adventurer tells of his life, his mother as a traditional singer, his first job – as a mechanic, his beginning in songs during colonial times, followed by success and then oblivion.

== Award ==
- FesPaCO 1993
