= Mama Colonel =

- French: Maman Colonelle
- Directed by: Dieudo Hamadi
- Written by: Dieudo Hamadi
- Produced by: Christian Lelong; Kiripi Katembo Siku
- Starring: Honorine Munyole
- Cinematography: Dieudo Hamadi
- Edited by: Anne Renardet
- Production companies: Cinédoc Films; IDFA Bertha Fund; Mutotu Productions
- Release date: April 2017 (Cinéma du Réel)
- Running time: 72 minutes
- Countries: Democratic Republic of the Congo; France; Netherlands; United States
- Languages: Lingala; Swahili

Mama Colonel (French: Maman Colonelle) is a documentary film from Democratic Republic of the Congo, directed by Dieudo Hamadi. The film focuses on the work of Colonel Honorine Munyole who, fights against sexual abuse and child abuse.

In the film Colonel Honorine Munyole who first works in the Bukavu police force in the Child protection and Anti-Sexual Violence unit, which is widely known for its good reputation. She is then transferred to Kisangani, where a few days upon her arrival, multiple victims of Sexual Violence paid her a visit. These victims where the result of the 6-day war (Six-day War) between Rwandan and Ugandan troops. She is determined to help the victims achieve justice they deserve.

== Synopsis ==
Colonel Honorine Munyole is a widow and mother of seven children, gets transferred from Bukavu to Kisangani. She is in charge, head of the special unit for protection of women and children. She has challenges communicating with some of the officers in her unit do not speak the local language Swahili they only speak only Lingala. She is yet to gain trust and confidence of the citizens to open up about the problems they face every day. Eventually widows and rape victims of almost 20 years war, feel there is someone to listen to them and rely on. Its hard to obtain justice for these Victims. The police unit is not capable to help these victims financially, thus they depend on donations from the community to help widows, rape victims, and children. Colonel Honorine Munyole uses public spaces, such as the market place to encourage the citizens to build solidarity among themselves, she teaches them about their rights in relations to sexual violence and the responsibilities parents have over their children. She is also seen providing food and shelter to some widows and orphans.

== Production ==
The documentary is produced by Dieudo Hamadi. Language used is Lingala, Swahili and French, it has English Subtitles.
