= The Draughtsmen Clash =

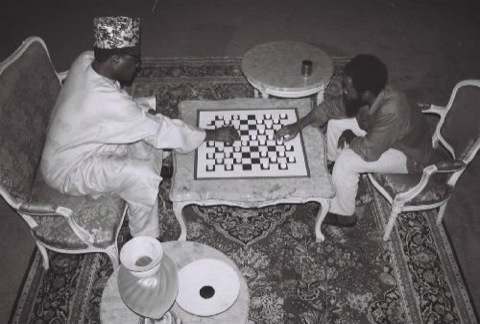
- Directed by: Balufu Bakupa-Kanyinda
- Screenplay by: Balufu Bakupa-Kanyinda
- Produced by: Centrale Productions Dipanda Yo ! Cenaci Myriapodus Films
- Starring: Dieudonné Kabongo Yves Mba Pascal N'Zonzi Jean LaCroix Kamba Djibril Nguemongwa
- Cinematography: Roland Duboze
- Edited by: Victor Howcq
- Music by: So Kalmer
- Release date: 1996
- Running time: 40 minutes
- Country: Democratic Republic of the Congo

The Draughtsmen Clash (Le Damier - Papa National Oyé !) is a 1996 film directed by Balufu Bakupa-Kanyinda of the Democratic Republic of the Congo.

== Synopsis ==
The Draughtsmen Clash is a wicked political satire about African dictators. It tells the story of the president of a fictitious African nation who spends a sleepless night playing checkers with a pot-smoking vagabond who claims to be the all-round champion. However, the rules of the game entail the opponents howling vulgar and foul obscenities at one another. The champion proceeds to insult, and trounce, the President. His reward, and his fate, will not surprise anyone.

The film was restored in 2K in 2021 by NYU Tisch, in association with Villa Albertine – French Embassy in the United States and the Cinémathèque Afrique of the Institut Français.

== Awards ==
- Fespaco (Uagadugú) 1997
- Festival de Villeurbanne 1997
- Reel Black Talent Award (Toronto) 1997
- Festival Francófono de Namur 1998
- National Black Programming Award (Filadelfia) 1998
