= Papy (2009 film) =

- Directed by: Djo Tunda Wa Munga
- Screenplay by: Djo Tunda Wa Munga
- Produced by: Suka! Productions Formosa Productions MG Productions
- Starring: Romain Ndomba; Chaida Chady; Suku Suku; Annie Kuka; Nzita Tumba
- Cinematography: Inigo Westmeier
- Edited by: Nathalie Triniac
- Release date: July 27, 2009 (Zanzibar Film Festival)
- Running time: 53'
- Countries: Belgium; Democratic Republic of the Congo; France

Papy is a 2009 film directed by Djo Tunda Wa Munga. It was released on 27 July 2009 at the Zanzibar Film Festival.

== Plot ==
Papy finds out he has AIDS. His wife and family reject him, he can no longer go to work and he has to take care of his children. To be able to obtain the antiretrovirals, a member of his family must accompany him, but he has no one. Desperate, he hires a homeless man to play the role of his uncle. Papy gets his medicines.
