= The Invader (2011 film) =

2011 film by Nicolas Provost

- Film poster
- Directed by: Nicolas Provost
- Written by: Nicolas Provost
- Produced by: Jacques-Henri Bronckart; Olivier Bronckart
- Starring: Isaka Sawadogo
- Cinematography: Frank van den Eeden
- Release date: 23 November 2011
- Running time: 107 minutes
- Country: Belgium
- Language: French

The Invader (French: L'envahisseur) is a 2011 Belgian drama film written and directed by Nicolas Provost.

== Plot ==
After Amadou, an illegal African immigrant, arrives in Brussels seeking a better life, his illusions of Europe are quickly shattered. He is exploited and consumed with the drudgery of daily existence, until he meets Agnès, a beautiful business woman, onto whom he projects his hopes and desires. His charisma and persistence seduces Agnès, who quickly wearies of his emotional burdens. When she severs all ties with Amadou, he sinks into destruction and violence.

== Cast ==
- Toni d'Antonio as Le taxi
- Laurence César as Caissière épicerie
- John Flanders as Dr. Charles de Yael
- Jean-Louis Froment as L'homme qui achète le bois
- Dieudonné Kabongo as Omar
- James Kazama as Liong Bing
- Hannelore Knuts as the nudist
- Katsuko Nakamura as L'amie d'Omar
- Ken Kelountang Ndiaye as Sioka (as Ken N'Diaye)
- Serge Riaboukine as Jean-Pierre, le passeur
- Stefania Rocca as Agnès de Yael
- Isaka Sawadogo as Amadou / Obama
- Tibo Vandenborre as Kris
- Bernard Van Vooren as Le clochard
- Carole Weyers as Kate

== Production ==
The Invader is a drama film written and directed by Nicolas Provost.

== Release ==
The film was screened at several film festivals, including the Toronto International Film Festival, in 2011 and 2012.

== Accolades ==
Dieudonné Kabongo received a Magritte Award nomination for Best Supporting Actor. The film was nominated for several awards, including Best Production Design at the 2013 Magritte Award; and winner of the Best Original Music and Sound Design at the 2011 Film Fest Gent.
