= Entre la coupe et l'élection =

- Directed by: Monique Mbeka Phoba; Guy Kabeya Muya
- Produced by: Monique MBEKA Phoba
- Cinematography: Guy KABEYA Muya, Amisi RADJABU
- Edited by: Guido WELKENHUYSEN
- Release date: 2008
- Running time: 56 minutes
- Country: Democratic Republic of the Congo
- Language: French

Entre la coupe et l'élection (Between the Cup and the Election) is a 2008 documentary film co-directed by Monique Mbeka Phoba and Guy Kabeya Muya. It tells of Zaire's football team at the 1974 FIFA World Cup and what happened to the players afterwards.

== Synopsis ==
The national team of the Democratic Republic of the Congo, the Leopards, won the Africa Cup of Nations in 1968 and 1974. They then competed in the 1974 World Cup in Germany. They were the first Sub-Saharan African team to qualify, and hopes were high. The team was decisively beaten, scoring no goals in three games against Scotland, Yugoslavia and Brazil. The Scots were openly racist against the Congo team. In the last game the Leopards let Brazil win a third goal so they could qualify for the next round, and ensure Scotland could not. The Leopards' pay was stolen by corrupt officials and they had to return home to face an angry dictator, Mobutu Sese Seko. However, they were each given a car and a house.

A group of young film students from the National Institute of Arts, Kinshasa tracks down the players, now living in obscurity, often without money and in poor health. The film alternates between the past and the present, in the run-up to the 2006 elections that followed the Second Congo War (1998–2003). The film compares failure of the team with the greater failure of the country to establish democracy. The Leopards captain, Kibonge Mafu, is the only successful member of the team, now running for election in Kinshasa. The narrator says of the Leopards "For them as for our country, the decline began".

== Production ==
The movie was made by Clarisse Muvuba and Démato Matondo, two students from the National Institute of Arts, before the 2006 elections. They were given hands-on training in the project by Kabeya Muya, while Mbeka Phoba obtained support and provided guidance via the internet.

== Reception ==
The film was screened at film festivals in cities such as New York, Milan, Libreville (Gabon), Tübingen (Germany), Ouagadougou (Burkina Faso) and Leuven (Belgium). A reviewer in Vanity Fair said the film has an unpolished feel but "offers as much insight into Congolese political culture as it does into Congolese soccer". Another reviewer called it a "spectacularly ambitious student film". Yet another said "The film’s raison d’etre is told unevenly and distractedly ... But still there are gems to be found in here, for footballers and Congo fans alike".
