= Le Congo, quel cinéma! =

- Directed by: Guy Bomanyama Zandu
- Produced by: Zandu Films
- Cinematography: Pierre Mieko
- Edited by: Guy Bomanyama Zandu
- Release date: 2005
- Running time: 7 minutes
- Country: Democratic Republic of the Congo

Le Congo, quel cinéma! is a 2005 documentary film directed by Guy Bomanyama-Zandu.

== Synopsis ==
Congolese cinema came to light by means of propaganda and educational films during the colonial era. Nowadays, local productions have a hard time keeping their above water, and Congolese filmmakers wonder about the future of a cinema lacking any kind of support. The film is a documentary about three Congolese technicians (Claude Mukendi, Pierre Mieko, and Paul Manvidia-Clarr) and Ferdinad Kanza, a director who made films in the years 1970-1980 and works at the National Radio Television of Congo.
