= Un Rêve d'Indépendance =

Un Rêve d’indépendance
- Directed by: Monique Mbeka Phoba
- Screenplay by: Monique Mbeka Phoba
- Produced by: Centre de l'Audiovisuel à Bruxelles
- Cinematography: Michel Baudour Pierre Mieko
- Edited by: France Duez
- Release date: 1998
- Running time: 54 minutes
- Country: Democratic Republic of the Congo

Un Rêve d’indépendance is a 1998 documentary film from the Democratic Republic of the Congo by Monique Mbeka Phoba.

== Synopsis ==
People no longer know what medical assistants were: neither the Belgians, who created this medical category during the colonization of the Belgian Congo, nor the Congolese people, who have let this part of their history sink into oblivion. Tracing the steps of her grandfather - formerly a medical assistant, now a doctor - the Congolese filmmaker uses this family history to portray her country 37 years after independence.

== Awards ==
- Cine Independiente, Bruselas, 1999
- Vues d'Afrique, Montreal, 2000
