= Ko Bongisa Mutu =

- Directed by: Claude Haffner
- Cinematography: Mahongue Mbait Jongue Nicolas Conan Claude Haffner
- Edited by: Chantal Piquet
- Release date: 2002
- Running time: 15 minutes
- Country: Democratic Republic of the Congo

Ko Bongisa Mutu is a 2002 documentary film directed by Claude Haffner.

== Synopsis ==
Plagued by the stress of Paris, a young woman from Congo-Kinshasa takes shelter in a hair salon in the Strasbourg-Saint-Denis neighborhood in Paris, where numerous African hairdressers have opened up for business. She spends a very enjoyable day watching the clients being taken care of, eating, singing and even dancing. She recovers memories from her childhood and a certain amount of serenity.
