= Jazz Mama =

- Directed by: Petna Ndaliko
- Produced by: Alkebu Film Productions
- Cinematography: Petna Ndaliko
- Edited by: Petna Ndaliko
- Release date: 2010
- Running time: 30 minutes
- Country: Democratic Republic of the Congo

Jazz Mama is a documentary film.

== Synopsis ==
Jazz Mama is both a film and a movement inspired by the uncompromising strength and dignity of Congolese women despite the obstacles and violence they face. Jazz Mama aims to bring awareness to gender based violence in Congo without reducing the women to victims whose lives are circumscribed by rape, but instead to recognize that, while sexual violence is indeed a devastating problem, these women are often not only survivors but the pillars of the community.

"The rape of the land, the mutilation of the flesh." La femme Congolaise - courageous and industrious despite the vicissitudes and the turbulence of life. She continues to fight for herself, taking on professions previously reserved for men. More often than not she must pay her children's school fees and compensate for her husband who is either underpaid, unemployed, or absent. She sells kikwembe at Zando market; she is an engineer repairing electronics on the corner of the street, she is a designer, a stylist, minister, or teacher. Demonstrating their incredible strength and their faith in their ability to continue their own advancement, these women stand strong in their communities even as they denounce the rape and the violence they experience.

"Both earth and mother, she is the foundation, like Kinshasa herself, scorned and beloved."

== Awards ==
- Zanzibar International Film Festival 2010
