= Dieudo Hamadi =

Congolese film director (born 1984)

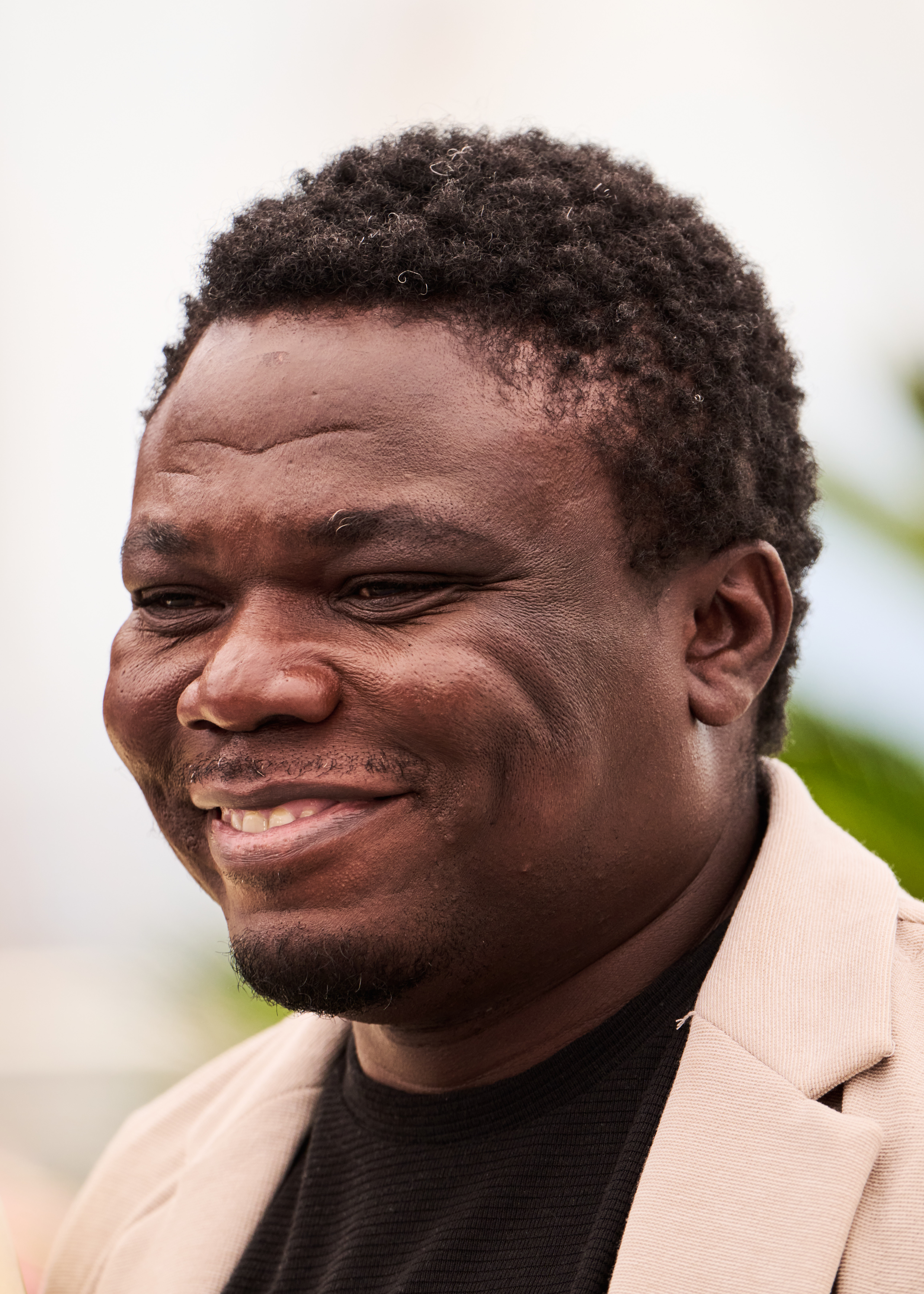
- Hamadi at the 2025 Cannes Film Festival
- Born: February 22, 1984 (age 42); Kisangani
- Citizenship: Democratic Republic of the Congo
- Occupations: Film director and screenwriter
- Notable work: Kinshasa Makambo

Dieudo Hamadi (born February 22, 1984) is a Congolese filmmaker and producer. He is known for documentaries that portray the struggles of ordinary people facing conflict, corruption, and social challenges in the Democratic Republic of the Congo.

== Early life and education ==
Hamadi was born in Kisangani. After starting medical studies in 2005, he eventually turned to filmmaking after participating in two workshops held in Kinshasa in 2007, one led by fellow Congolese Djo Munga. He went on to graduate from the INSAS film school in Brussels.

== Career ==
Hamadi initially directed music videos and commercials before turning to documentary filmmaking. His first short documentary film, Ladies in Waiting (Dames en attente), won the Pierre et Yolande Perrault Grant for an emerging filmmaker at the Cinéma du Réel film festival in 2010. The film was part of Congo in Four Acts, an anthology of four short films by emerging Congolese filmmakers, which also included his short film,Tolerance Zero.

In 2013, his feature film Atalaku (Town Criers) won the Cinéma du Réel festival's Joris Ivens Prize for Best First Film. In 2014, he won the same festival's Potemkine and Société civile des auteurs multimédia awards for Examen d'État (National Diploma), and in 2017 he won the festival's Grand Prize for Mama Colonel.

In 2017, he founded his Kinshasa-based production company, Kiripifilms.

In 2018, his film Kinshasa Makambo won the Tim Hetherington Award at the 2018 Sheffield DocFest, and the True Vision Award at the 2018 True/False Film Festival.

His 2020 film Downstream to Kinshasa (En route pour le milliard) was named an Official Selection of the 2020 Cannes Film Festival, the first film from the Democratic Republic of the Congo ever nominated. Mostly known only in his own country until then, Downstream brought Hamadi to the attention of a global audience. Due to the cancellation of the festival in light of the COVID-19 pandemic in France, it was not screened at that time; however, it was given an online screening for distributors as part of the Marché du Film. It had its public premiere in September 2020 as part of the Planet Africa program at the 2020 Toronto International Film Festival, where it received an honorable mention from the jury for the Amplify Voices Award.

He next co-directed Lumumba: Return of a Hero (Lumumba, le retour d'un héros), a 2023 documentary about the return of Patrice Lumumba's remains to the DRC from Belgium.

In 2024 he wrote and produced Life is a Railroad (La Vie est un chemin de fer) a feature film combining four short films by Maria Donda, Okoko Nyumbaiza, Moimi Wezam et Michael Bauma.

As of June 2026, Hamadi is in post-production on a 6-episode Sci-Fi-Fantasy series, Milimo, Les âmes errantes de Kinshasa, which he is producing and directing for Canal +.

He served as a member of the main Competition jury for the 2025 Cannes Film Festival. At the same festival, Hamadi joined fellow Congolese in founding the Okapi Film Collective, an initiative to strengthen the Congolese film industry through international collaboration.

== Filmography ==
Hamadi's films include:

Year	Film	Genre	Role	Duration (min)
2010	Ladies in Waiting (Dames en attente)	Short documentary on a maternity ward	Co-director with Divita Wa Lusala	24 m
2013	Atalaku (Town Criers)	Drama feature on Congo's 2011 presidential election	Director, screenwriter	62 m
2014	Examen d'État (National Diploma)	Documentary feature on Kisangani students	Director, screenwriter	90 m
2017	Mama Colonel (Maman Colonelle)	Documentary on a female police officer supporting victims of sexual abuse	Director, screenwriter	72 m
2018	Kinshasa Makambo	Documentary on Joseph Kabila's third term	Director, screenwriter	75 m
2020	Downstream to Kinshasa (En route pour le milliard)	Documentary on war invalids	Director, screenwriter	90 m
2023	Lumumba: Return of a Hero (Lumumba, le retour d'un héros)	Documentary	Director, screenwriter	86 m
2024	Life is a Railroad (La Vie est un chemin de fer)	Feature film	Producer, screenwriter	90 m
2025	Les âmes errantes de Kinshasa	Television series	Producer, director	Post-production

== Awards ==
Hamadi's films obtained 16 awards and 23 nominations, including:

Film	Festival	Award
Atalaku (Town Criers, 2013)	Cinéma du Réel	2013 Prix Joris Ivens du Meilleur Premier film
Examen d'État (National Diploma, 2014)	Cinéma du Réel	2014 Cinéma du Réel SCAM Award; 2014 Cinéma du Réel Potemkine Award, (Prix des éditeurs)
Mama Colonel (Maman Colonelle, 2017)	Berlin International Film Festival	2017 Winner Prize of the Ecumenical Jury
Downstream to Kinshasa (En route pour le milliard, 2020)	Toronto International Film Festival (TIFF)	2020 Winner Amplify Voices Award Special mention
idem	Golden Apricot Yerevan International Film Festival	2021 Winner Silver Apricot; Feature Competition
idem	International Film Festival and Forum on Human Rights	2021 Winner Gilda Vieira de Mello Award
idem	War on Screen	2021 Winner International Jury Grand Prize
