= Kafka au Congo =

- Directed by: Marlène Rabaud Arnaud Zajtman
- Screenplay by: Marlène Rabaud Arnaud Zajtman
- Produced by: Eklektik Productions
- Cinematography: Marlène Rabaud
- Edited by: Sophie Vercruysse
- Release date: 2010
- Running time: 59 minutes
- Countries: Belgium; Democratic Republic of the Congo

Kafka au Congo is a 2010 documentary film.

== Synopsis ==
Kafka au Congo is a tragicomic journey behind the scenes of Congo law and politics. Gorette's lands have been unfairly expropriated, and she has spent the last 15 years going from one office to another trying to have her case heard. But whenever she is given an appointment, something gets in the way, she has to grease another bureaucrat and she loses confidence. At the other end of the justice system is the parliamentary administrator, Bahati, in charge of Congo's national parliament's finances, happily making a packet working the corrupt system.
