= Congopresse =

Photographic agency

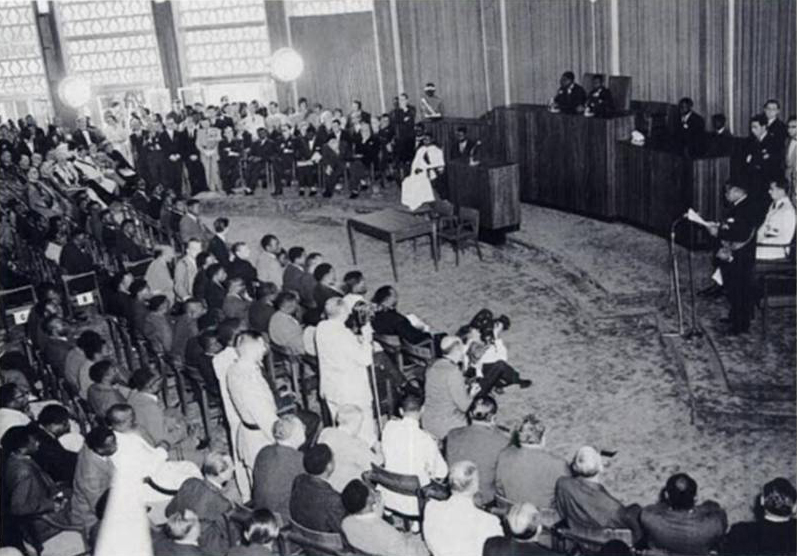
President Joseph Kasa-Vubu speaks at the independence ceremony for the Congo, 30 June 1960 (Congopresse)

Congopresse was a photographic agency active in the Belgian Congo and in the early years of the Republic of the Congo.

== History ==
Congopresse was founded in 1947, under the aegis of the Belgian colonial administration's Centre d'information et de documentation du Congo belge et du Ruanda-Urundi. The agency served was the main source of documentary photography and photojournalism from Congo in the 1950s, as foreign press rarely traveled to the Congo or took their own photographs there. The photos were sent to Brussels where the Ministry of Colonies compiled, edited, and disseminated them as propaganda.

Congopresse largely relied on European photographers in its early years. Joseph Makula was hired as its first Congolese photographer in 1956. The European staff all left at independence, and in the 1960s Makula trained a new generation of Congolese photographers to replace them, including Mpate Sulia, the agency's only female photographer. The agency closed in 1968. The Royal Museum for Central Africa in Belgium currently maintains the Congopresse archives.
