= Afro@Digital =

2002 film by Balufu Bakupa-Kanyinda

- Directed by: Balufu Bakupa-Kanyinda
- Produced by: N'Diagne Adechoubou
- Release date: 2002
- Running time: 52 minutes
- Country: Democratic Republic of the Congo

Afro@Digital is a 2002 documentary film.

== Synopsis ==
Afro@Digital explores how digital technology has changed the lives of Africans. For instance, a marabout explains that he no longer replies by letter to questions from Africans living abroad: he uses his cell phone. Another eloquent illustration of the digital revolution in Africa is the proliferation of Internet cafés full of young people. It raises challenging questions about the use of technology in various domains, and in documenting humanity's memory and also asks how digital technology might be used in the service of African people tomorrow.

== Awards ==
- Zimbabwe 2004
