= Kinshasa palace =

- Directed by: Zeka Laplaine
- Screenplay by: Zeka Laplaine
- Produced by: Les Histoires Weba
- Starring: Zeka Laplaine, Ambre Laplaine, Iris Laplaine, Gaspard Laplaine, Anna Maria Laplaine, Fabienne Luco, Kapinga Wambombo
- Cinematography: Zeka Laplaine, Octavio Espirito Santo
- Edited by: Agnès Contensou
- Music by: Gilles Fournier
- Release date: 2007
- Running time: 71 minutes
- Country: Democratic Republic of the Congo

Kinshasa palace is a 2006 film.

== Synopsis ==
A man about whom we know very little searches for his brother who disappeared after leaving his children at the station. As he traces his steps through Paris, Kinshasa, Brussels, Lisbon and Cambodia, childhood memories flood back. Little by little, he metamorphoses until it's difficult to tell him apart from his missing brother.

== Awards ==
- Quintessence Ouidah (Benín)
