= Pierre Haffner =

20th century French film critic

Pierre Haffner (1943–2000) was a French film critic, "one of the first French critics to seriously study African film".

== Life ==
Pierre Haffner was born in Mulhouse. In the 1970s he lived in Zaire, becoming an expert in the cinema of Zaire. In November 1977 he interviewed his friend Ousmane Sembène in Kinshasa.

He died of cancer on 12 November 2000.

== Works ==
- Essai sur les fondements du cinéma africain. Abidjan: Les nouvelles éditions africaines, 1976.
- Palabres sur le cinématographe: initiation au cinéma, Kinshasa: Presses africaines, 1978.
- 'Entretien avec le père Alexandre Van den Heuvel', Afrique littéraire et artistique, No. 48, 1978, p. 88
- 'Jean Rouch jugé par six cinéaste d’Áfrique noire: Safi Faye, Daniel Kamwa, Rihard de Medeiros, Moussa Yoro Bathily, Oumarou Ganda et Inoussa Ousseini.' Jean Rouch, un griot gaulois. CinéAction, No. 17, 1982.
- Petit à Petit en question: le film de Jean Rouch discuté dans deux ciné-clubs d’Afrique noire. CinéAction, No. 17, 1982.
- Jean Renoir. Paris: Rivages, 1987
- (with André Gardies) Regards sur le cinéma négro-africain. Brussels: OCIC, 1987.
