= Guy Kabeya Muya =

DR Congolese filmmaker (born 1970)

- Born: 1970 (age 55–56); Kinshasa
- Education: National Institute of Performance Arts
- Occupation: Filmmaker
- Known for: Entre la coupe et l'élection

Guy Kabeya Muya (born 1970) is a filmmaker from the Democratic Republic of the Congo. He was co-director with Monique Mbeka Phoba of the 2007 documentary Entre la coupe et l'élection (Between the cup and the election).

== Early life and education ==
Guy Kabeya Muya was born in Kinshasa in 1970. In 1988 he entered the National Institute of Performance Arts (INAS) in Kinshasa, graduating with a degree in drama in 1996. He also took courses in Mbalmayo, Cameroon on audiovisual techniques and in Douala, Cameroon on animation and visual communication. He worked at Les Films de la Passerelle in Brussels as a post-production trainee and attended workshops at the Lagunimages Festival in Benin.

== Career ==
Kabeya Muya wrote and directed television dramas in 1999. In 2004 he was first assistant to Thierry Michel on the set of the film Congo River, Beyond Darkness. In 2006 he and Guy Bomanyama-Zandu co-directed the 52-minute drama Muswamba. This movie tells of a teenage girl thrown onto the street and struggling to survive after being accused of sorcery. It provides a strong moral message about the evils of child abuse. Kabeya Muya established the production company Kabola Films which makes cinematographic animations in the center of Kinshasa. As part of a workshop led by Thierry De Mey of Charleroi Danses he directed the 2007 documentary Cailloux (Pebbles) on informal economic enterprise in Kinshasa.

Kabeya Muya worked with veteran documentary director Monique Mbeka Phoba on a project where a group of young theater students in Kinshasa learned how to make a film. Kabeya Muya provided the hands-on training while Mbeka Phoba provided guidance via the internet. This led to the 2007 documentary Entre la coupe et l'élection (Between the cup and the election) about the first soccer team from Sub-Saharan Africa to participate in a FIFA World Cup, in 1974, co-produced by him and Mbeka Phoba. The team was The Leopards, the national team of the Democratic Republic of the Congo. The team was defeated in three consecutive matches where they scored no goals, had their pay stolen by corrupt officials and had to return home to face an angry dictator.

In April 2006 Kabeya Muya was severely beaten by armed men who threatened to kill him because of his relations with foreigners. In 2009 he received death threats for having worked on the film Katanga Business as assistant director to Thierry Michel. The filmmaker Monique Mbeka Phoba quickly mobilized an international campaign to ensure that the Congolese authorities extended their protection.

== Filmography ==
Year	Film	Role	Notes
2002	Un Foyer au Coeur de la Forêt (A home in the heart of the forest)	Director of Photography	
2004	Congo River, Beyond Darkness	Assistant director	Directed by Thierry Michel
2006	Muswamba	Co-director	52-minute fiction
2007	Cailloux (Pebbles)	Director	Short documentary
2007	Entre la coupe et l'élection (Between the cup and the election)	Co-director	56 minutes documentary. Co-directed by Monique Mbeka Phoba
2008	L'Ecrivaine dans sa vie (The writer in his life)	Producer	Documentary directed by Clarisse Muvuba
2010	Ghetto Millionaires	Assistant Director	54 minutes, Documentary / Drama
