= Muana Mboka =

- Directed by: Jean-Michel Kibushi Ndjate Wooto
- Release date: 1999
- Running time: 14 minutes
- Countries: Belgium; Democratic Republic of the Congo

Muana Mboka is a 1999 short animated film.

== Synopsis ==
Muana Mboka is a street boy like so many others in the big cities of Africa. Like most, he survives through larceny, occasional jobs, and prostitution. Muana Mboka saves the life of a minister who was stuck in a traffic jam. The reward received and the rumors going around create hatred and envy. Suddenly, the entire city is thrown into utter darkness. This sudden event has a beneficial effect on Muana's family members.
