= Moseka =

- Directed by: Roger Kwami Mambu Zinga
- Screenplay by: Félix Blaise Malutuma
- Produced by: Institut des Arts de Diffusion
- Cinematography: Sandro Usai
- Edited by: Robert Couez
- Release date: 1971
- Running time: 24 minutes
- Country: Democratic Republic of the Congo

Moseka is a 1971 documentary film.

== Synopsis ==
Moseka, a young woman from Zaire, travels to Europe to study. With her braided hair and traditional clothes, she is the laughingstock of her fellow students who strive to look European, adopting wigs and European clothing. The film tells of the depersonalization of young Africans when they enter into contact with the European culture. In this sense, the film fits into the "authenticity policy" of Mobutu.

== Awards ==
Moseka was named best short film at the 3rd Panafrican Film and Television Festival of Ouagadougou (FESPACO).
