= Monique Mbeka Phoba =

Belgian-born Congolese filmmaker (born 1962)

- Born: 14 July 1962 (age 63); Brussels, Belgium
- Education: Institut Saint-Luc; Université libre de Bruxelles; Ateliers Varan; Institut des Arts de Diffusion
- Occupations: Filmmaker; screenwriter; journalist; cultural promoter
- Known for: Un Rêve d'Indépendance

Monique Mbeka Phoba (born 14 July 1962) is a Belgian-born Congolese filmmaker, screenwriter, journalist, and cultural promoter. Regarded as one of Africa's leading documentary filmmakers, her work has been broadcast on African public television channels, including those in the Democratic Republic of the Congo, Republic of the Congo, Benin, and Senegal, as well as on European networks such as TV5Monde, RTBF, ARTE, and ZDF. Her award-winning films often address social, cultural, and political issues across Africa. She is the manager of the Brussels-based film production company Rumbacom.

Born in Brussels to a Congolese diplomatic family, she began her media career in the 1980s as a radio presenter while studying business, later earning a degree in commercial and consular sciences from Institut Saint-Luc in Brussels in 1991. She complemented her academic background with training in cultural journalism and worked with the Université libre de Bruxelles radio station as well as RTBF. From 1995 to 2007, Phoba resided in Benin, where she worked for Bénin TV and played a pivotal role in promoting African cinema. In 2000, she founded Lagunimages, a company that later evolved into a film festival dedicated to the production, distribution, and exhibition of African cinema. Since returning to Belgium in 2007, she obtained a degree in screenwriting from Institut des Arts de Diffusion (IAD).

== Early life ==
Monique Mbeka Phoba was born on 14 July 1962 in Brussels to a Congolese father who worked in diplomacy for the Democratic Republic of the Congo. She spent her early years between continents, regularly visiting the DRC during school holidays. Following her father's resignation from diplomatic service, she settled permanently in Belgium in 1978 at the age of sixteen. Phoba developed an early interest in African cinema and, in 1985, reported on the release of the notable Congolese film La vie est belle. She completed a degree in commercial and consular sciences at Institut Saint-Luc in Brussels in 1991, with a thesis titled "Cooperation between the European and African audiovisual industries". She subsequently undertook training in cultural journalism and became involved with Radio-Campus, the student radio of the Université libre de Bruxelles, where she focused on African culture. She also worked with RTBF, the French-speaking public broadcaster of Belgium, and contributed articles to several publications in Brussels and Geneva, such as Tam-Tam, Negrissimo, and Regards. She then enrolled in an introductory course in video documentary at the Ateliers Varan in Paris.

== Career ==
=== 1991–1992: First films ===
In 1991, Phoba premiered her debut 13-minute documentary film, Corps à cœur. The film portrays a dance class set on Rue du Faubourg du Temple in Paris, where Jacques' drumming on the djembe sets the rhythm and participants engage in an immersive celebration of movement. Elisa leads the group with positive direction, guiding a series of African dance steps that leave the narrator physically drained and mentally invigorated. That same year, Phoba created the 26-minute film Revue en vrac in collaboration with Fred Mongu, a journalist from Zaire's national broadcaster OZRT. Though initially envisioned as a documentary on the Sovereign National Conference (Conférence nationale souveraine; CNS), the focus shifted to the development of an independent press in Zaire amid the country's severe political unrest. Phoba believed the timing was significant and felt the film could serve as an important historical record. Working with limited resources, a simple camera and Hi-8 tape, and no budget, she filmed under challenging conditions marked by suspicion from state security forces. The film offers a behind-the-scenes look at key newspapers like Le Potentiel, Elima, La Semaine, Grognon, Forum des As, and Umoja, capturing public and political reactions to Étienne Tshisekedi's appointment as Prime Minister.

=== 1993–present: Recognition and cultural exploration ===
Two years later, she directed the documentary Rentrer? (1993, 52 minutes), which addresses the issue of brain drain and won the South/North prize from the European Council at the Festival International Médias Nord-Sud in Geneva in 1996. Phoba's 1996 short film Une voix dans le Silence depicts the struggles of Bruno Ediko, an HIV-positive man from Benin. Her fourth documentary, Deux petits tours et puis s'en vont… (Two little turns and then gone), co-directed with Emmanuel Kolawole, focuses on Benin as a testing ground for African democracy and won second prize in the TV/Video documentary category at FESPACO in March 1997. In 1998, Phoba made Un rêve d'indépendance, a film reflecting on 35 years of independence in the Democratic Republic of the Congo, which received the Images of Women award at Montreal's Vues d'Afrique Festival in April 2000. That same year, she established Lagunimages, the first film festival in Benin, a biennial event offering free film and documentary screenings in cinemas and outdoor venues.

Phoba premiered her documentary Anna, l'Enchantée in 2001. The film follows Anna Teko, a singer who receives a scholarship to study music in France, but due to inadequate preparation, she returns after just three months. The film was awarded the Images of Women prize at Vues d'Afrique Festival in April 2002. In February 2003, she served as a short film jury member at the 18th edition of the FESPACO. In 2004, she released Sorcière, la vie!, a 52-minute documentary examining the presence of witchcraft in the Democratic Republic of the Congo, critically exploring the cultural values surrounding the phenomenon while serving as a personal investigation into Phoba's own heritage shaped by her years living abroad. In 2008, Phoba co-directed Entre la coupe et l'élection with Guy Kabeya Muya, a documentary set between the 2006 FIFA World Cup and the Congolese elections, focusing on two National Institute of Arts students attempting to document Zaire's historic 1974 World Cup appearance by Les Léopards (meaning "The Leopards"). That same year, on 10 October, she co-directed La santé n'a pas de prix with the Belgian Technical Cooperation (CTB). Premiered at the Wallonie-Bruxelles Center through an initiative of the National Program for Medicine Supply (Programme national d'approvisionnement en médicament; PNAM) and in the presence of Health Minister Victor Makwenge Kaput, the 20-minute documentary shows how PNAM functions and promotes safe access to medicines to prevent the use of counterfeit or low-quality drugs in the country's largely unregulated pharmaceutical market. From 1995 to 2007, Phoba lived in Benin, where she has worked on production, distribution and promotion of African cinema. Her first short 23-minute fiction film, Soeur Oyo, a 23-minute trilingual project in Lingala, Kikongo, and French, was released in 2014. It received three awards and was shown over 50 times at festivals and community events across Africa, Europe, and North America.

== Filmography ==
Year	Film	Role	Ref.
1991	Corps à cœur	Director	
1991	Revue en vrac	Director	
1993	Rentrer?		
1996	Une voix dans le silence		
1997	Deux petits tours et puis s'en vont…	Director	
1998	Un rêve d'indépendance	Director, writer	
2001	Anna, l'enchantée	Director	
2004	Sorcière, la vie!	Director, actor, writer	
2008	Entre la coupe et l'élection	Director, writer	
2010	Tout le monde a des raisons d'en vouloir à sa mère	Actor	
2014	Soeur Oyo		
