= Lamokowang =

Lamokowang (Calabash)
- Directed by: Petna Ndaliko
- Screenplay by: Petna Ndaliko
- Produced by: Centre d'étude et de production vidéographique
- Cinematography: Petna Ndaliko Katondolo
- Edited by: Petna Ndaliko
- Music by: Lokua Kanza Watmon Cultural Group
- Release date: 2003
- Running time: 13 minutes
- Country: Democratic Republic of the Congo

Lamokowang is a 2003 documentary film from the Democratic Republic of the Congo.

== Synopsis ==
The calabash is used as a metaphor for Africa and its representation of cinema. The rhythm intrudes into the film to pose questions of yesterday's cinema and emphatically address tomorrow's. Will cinema be able to break free from clichés and prejudices?

== Production ==
It is one of three short films along with True Story and Intervention Rapide made by Katondolo in conjunction with Yole!Africa, a community arts organization based in Goma.

== Awards ==
- Zanzíbar 2004
