= Benoît Lamy =

Belgian screenwriter, producer and director

- Born: Arlon, Belgium
- Died: 15 April 2008 (aged 62); Braine-l'Alleud, Belgium
- Occupations: Film director, writer

Benoît Lamy (French pronunciation: [bənwa lami]; died 15 April 2008) was a Belgian film director, best known for his picture Home Sweet Home (1973).

== Early life ==
Benoît Lamy was born in Arlon in the Belgian Province of Luxembourg.

== Career ==
Lamy's film debut Home Sweet Home, starring Claude Jade and Jacques Perrin, won a Diploma award at the 8th Moscow International Film Festival. It was also nominated for a Golden Prize award and received 14 international awards from Montréal to Tehran.

Along with Gabrielle Borile, their picture Combat de fauves (1997) won a Golden Bayard award at the Namur International Festival of French-Speaking Film.

== Death ==
On 15 April 2008 Lamy was murdered by Perceval Ceulemans, with whom he lived with in Nivelles, He died in Braine-l'Alleud. On 15 July 2014 Ceulemans was sentenced to 3 1/2 years in prison for "voluntary manslaughter".

== Films ==
- Cartoon Circus (1972, documentary about Franco-Belgian comics, starring Cabu, François Cavanna, Professeur Choron, Jules Feiffer, GAL, Joke, Picha, Jean-Marc Reiser, Siné, Roland Topor, Willem and Georges Wolinski.)
- Home Sweet Home (1973, starring Claude Jade)
- Ham from the Ardennes (Jambon d'Ardenne) (1977, with Annie Girardot)
- Life Is Beautiful (La vie est belle) (1987 with Papa Wemba)
- Wild Games (Combat de fauve) (1997 with Richard Bohringer)
