= Mwezé Ngangura =

Film director from the Democratic Republic of the Congo

- Born: 7 October 1950 (age 75); Bukavu
- Occupation: Filmmaker

Mwezé Ngangura (born 7 October 1950) is a film director from the Democratic Republic of the Congo (DRC). Considered a pioneer of Congolese filmmaking, he is known for the classic La Vie est Belle (1987), the first feature film made in the DRC.

== Early life and education ==
Mwezé Ngangura was born in Bukavu, Democratic Republic of Congo (then called Belgian Congo) on 7 October 1950. At the age of twenty he won a scholarship to study in Belgium, with the criteria that he had to pursue an area of study not available in Zaire. There were no Congolese film schools at the time, and interested in filmmaking, Ngangura went on to pursue film studies at the Institut des Arts de Diffusion in Louvain-la-Neuve, graduating in 1975. While a student he made two short films, Tamtam-Electronique (1973) and Rhythm and blood (1975).

== Career ==
=== Early career ===
After completeing his studies in Belgium, Ngangura returned to Zaire in 1976 and became a lecturer at the National Institute of Arts (INA) in Kinshasa, the capital. In a 2019 interview he explained that it was his only option. “The other option was to work as a director in national television which had only a few entertainment or political propaganda programmes.” He also taught at the Institute of Science and Information Technologies (ISTI), and Studio-School of the Voice of Zaire (SEVOZA).

In 1980, he directed Cherie Samba, a short documentary about the eponymous Congelese artist. He followed up with Kin Kiesse (1983) another short documentary that was a portrait of Kinshasa and its people. According to Ngangura, Samba, who narrated the film, was instrumental in getting the French Ministry of Co-operation, France 2 and Congolese television to back the project. The film went on to win Best Documentary at FESPACO in 1983 and Best First Feature at the 1983 Conseil International des radios et télévisions d'Expression Française (CIRTEF) conference held in Hammamet.

Ngangura's attendance at FESPACO proved to be a seminal experience that was to influence his future filmmaking. He found that most of the African films screened were made for a Western audience and did not reflect the everyday lived experiences of Africans, and therefor not accessible to the average African. “Watching many of the African films screened in this festival it was clear to me that those films were not directed to an African audience. Africa in most of these films was only a subject and the audience were outside the filmmakers’ calculations.”

=== Career progression ===
For his next film and his first feature, La Vie est Belle (Life is Wonderful), Ngangura sought to make a film that was uplifting, humorous, suffused with Congolese music, and relatable to African audiences. In 1985, Mwezé Ngangura returned to Belgium to work on the script of La Vie est Belle with funding from the French Ministry of Foreign Affairs. Set in the vibrant, music-filled streets of Kinshasa, La Vie est Belle follows Kourou (played by legendary Congolese musician Papa Wemba), a young man from a small village who dreams of success in the world of music.

Co-directed with Belgian director Benoit Lamy and released under the banner of Ngangura's Kinshasa based production company, Sol'Oeil Films, La Vie est Belle was a big hit in Francophone Africa and was also among the few African films to reach an international audience outside the continent at the time of its release. It received favorable reviews from mainstream publications such as the New York Times and the Christian Science Monitor.

In 1992, Mwezé Ngangura made Changa-Changa, Rythmes en noirs et blancs (Changa-Changa, Rhythms in Black and White), a documentary produced in Brussels on intercultural encounters where different styles of music enrich. Changa-Changa was broadcast on television and shown at many festivals, including FESPACO (Pan African Film Festival of Ouagadougou), Vues d'Afrique (Montreal), and Bilan du Film Ethnographique (Paris).

In 1994, he made Le Roi, la vache et le bananier (The King, the Cow and the Banana), a 60-minute documentary that won several awards. The next year he directed Lettre à Makura : les derniers Bruxellois, a view by an African ethnologist of the marolliens, the oldest community in Brussels. In 1997, he directed Le général Tombeur, a 26-minute documentary that tells the story of Bukavu from the expedition of General Charles-Henri Tombeur in 1914-18 to the current date. This film was selected at the Festival of Ouagadougou (FESPACO) in February 1997 and the Montreal festival Views from Africa in April 1997.

In 1998 Mwezé Ngangura directed Pièces d'Identités (Identity Pieces), a feature film shot in Brussels (mainly in the district of Matonge - Ixelles ) and Cameroon, which received the Audience Award at the 8th Festival of African Cinema of Milan in 1998 and the Grand Prix at FESPACO in Ouagadougou in 1999. Pièces d'Identités is a modern fairy story set in the world of African immigrants in Europe. His 2005 film Les Habits Neuf du Gouverneur again starred Papa Wemba. The production schedule was disrupted when Wemba was sent to jail in Belgium to await trial on charges of human trafficking.

== Filmography ==
Year	Title	Notes
1973	Tamtam-Electronique	25 minutes
1975	Rhythm and Blood	20 minutes
1980	Chéri-Samba	26 minutes
1983	Kin-Kiesse ou les Joies douces-amères de Kinshasa-la-Belle	26 minutes
1987	La vie est belle	80 minutes. Co-directed with Benoît Lamy
1992	Changa-Changa, Rythmes en noirs et blancs	60 minutes
1994	Le Roi, la vache et le bananier, Chronique d'un retour au royaume de Ngweshe	60 minutes
1995	Lettre à Makura : les derniers Bruxellois	26 minutes
1997	Le général Tombeur	26 minutes
1998	Pièces d'Identités	90 minutes
2001	Au nom de mon père	50 minutes, Documentary
2005	Les Habits neufs du gouverneur	
2010	Tu n'as encore rien vu de kinshasa	
