= Congo in Four Acts =

South African documentary film

- Directed by: Dieudo Hamadi; Kiripi Katembo; Divita Wa Lusala
- Produced by: Djo Tunda Wa Munga Steven Markovitz
- Cinematography: Deschamps Matala Divita Wa Lusala
- Edited by: Divita Wa Lusala Ronelle Loots Frédéric Massiot
- Release date: 2010
- Running time: 72 minutes
- Countries: Democratic Republic of the Congo; South Africa

Congo in Four Acts is a 2010 documentary film.

== Synopsis ==
Initiated as an educational project to help young filmmakers develop their craft, Congo in Four Acts is a quartet of short films. "Ladies in Waiting (Dames en attente)" chronicles the bureaucratic dysfunctions of a maternity ward from which women cannot leave unless they pay their fees. "Symphony Kinshasa" takes the viewer on a tour through Congo's capital city where malaria is rife, electricity cables lie in the street and garbage is everywhere. "Zero Tolerance" deals with rape as a weapon of war in Eastern RDC and the attempts by authorities to re-establish the national moral code. "After the Mine" depicts life in Kipushi, a mining town where the soil is contaminated.

== Production ==
The film was co-directed by Dieudo Hamadi, Kiripi Katembo and Divita Wa Lusala.

== Awards ==
- Cinéma du Réel 2010
- Africa Movie Academy Awards 2011
- The Pierre And Yolande Perrault Grant at Cinema Du Reel (“Ladies In Waiting”)
- The Grand Prix - One World Kyrgyzstan International Film Festival 2011

== See also ==
- Kinshasa Symphony
