= Downstream to Kinshasa =

2020 Democratic Republic of the Congo film

- Film poster
- French: En route pour le milliard
- Directed by: Dieudo Hamadi
- Written by: Dieudo Hamadi
- Produced by: Dieudo Hamadi
- Cinematography: Dieudo Hamadi
- Edited by: Hélène Ballis; Catherina Catella
- Production companies: Kiripifilms; Les Films de l'oeil sauvage Neon Rouge Production
- Release date: September 14, 2020 (TIFF)
- Running time: 90 minutes
- Country: Democratic Republic of the Congo
- Languages: Lingala; Swahili

Downstream to Kinshasa (French: En route pour le milliard) is a documentary film from the Democratic Republic of the Congo, directed by Dieudo Hamadi and released in 2020. The film centres on survivors of the DRC's Six-Day War of 2000, many of whom are travelling to Kinshasa to demand compensation from the government for the losses they incurred during the conflict.

The film was officially selected for the 2020 Cannes Film Festival, the first film from the Democratic Republic of the Congo ever designated, with its English title initially given as The Billion Road. Due to the cancellation of the festival in light of the COVID-19 pandemic in France, it was not screened at that time; however, it was given an online screening for distributors as part of the Marché du Film.

It had its public premiere in September 2020 as part of the Planet Africa program at the 2020 Toronto International Film Festival, where it received an honorable mention from the jury for the Amplify Voices Award. It was subsequently screened at the Dok Leipzig festival in October.

Among other awards, the film also won Gilda Vieira de Mello Prize at FIFDH 2021.
