= La Vie est Belle (1987 film) =

La Vie est belle
- Directed by: Mwezé Ngangura; Benoît Lamy
- Screenplay by: Mweze Ngangura, Maryse Léon, Benoît Lamy
- Produced by: Lamy Films; Stephan Films; Sol’Œil Films; Véra Belmont
- Starring: Papa Wemba Bibi Krubwa Landu Nzunzimbu Matshia Kanku Kasongo Lokinda Mengi Feza Alfa
- Cinematography: Michel Badour
- Edited by: Martine Giordano
- Music by: Papa Wemba, Klody, Zaïko Langa Langa, Tshala Muana
- Release date: 1987
- Running time: 83 minutes
- Country: Zaire

La Vie est belle (English: Life is Rosy) is a 1987 musical comedy directed by Mwezé Ngangura and Benoît Lamy. The film is set in Kinshasa's music scene and tells the rags-to-riches story of a poor village musician, played by Papa Wemba, who moves to the city hoping to build a successful music career. Instead of focusing on the effects of colonialism, as many African films of the time did, La Vie est belle celebrates Congolese culture, music, and daily life in Kinshasa. The cast also includes Bibi Krubwa Landu, Landu Nzunzimbu Matshia, Kanku Kasongo, Lokinda Mengi, Feza Alfa, Pépé Kallé and Rody Emoro.

Ngangura was inspired to make La vie est belle after attending the Panafrican Film and Television Festival of Ouagadougou, where his short film Kin-Kiesse (1983) won the award for Best Documentary. After watching many of the films shown at the festival, he believed that they did not speak directly to African audiences because they focused more on showing Africa than on telling stories about the lives of its people. He also drew ideas from comedy sketches that were regularly shown on national television and were popular because they focused on the daily experiences of ordinary people. Choosing Papa Wemba and music as the main focus was a deliberate decision to appeal to audiences in the Congo and throughout Africa, where Congolese musicians were among the continent's most popular performers.

== Plot ==
Kourou (played by Papa Wemba) goes from his village to Kinshasa, his heart full of dreams of music and success. The capital city of Zaire is then the center of "World Music". Once there, he falls in love with Kabibi, a virginal young woman who wants to be a secretary. Unfortunately Nvouandou, a club owner searching for a second wife, also wants to marry her. Will Nvouandou's first wife turn out to be the best ally for young Kourou?

== Cast ==
Character	Actor
Kourou	Papa Wemba
Kabibi	Bibi Krubwa
Mamou	Landu Matshia Clementine
Nvouandou	Kanko Kasongo
Nzazi	Lokinda Feza
Mongali	Kalimazi Riva
Emoro	Himself
Pépé Kallé	Himself

== Awards ==
- The Georges Delerue Prize of the Ghent International Film Festival (1987)
- Bronze Mask of Taormina International Film Festival.
