= Joseph Makula =

- Born: 1929; Orientale Province, Belgian Congo
- Died: 2006 (aged 76–77)
- Education: Force Publique (military photography)
- Known for: photography
- Patrons: Sango Ya Biso; Pourquoi pas l'Avenir; Congopresse
- Military career
- Allegiance: Congo
- Branch: Force Publique
- Service years: 1948–1956

Joseph Makula (1929–2006) was a Congolese photographer. He initially served as a military photographer for the Force Publique before being hired as the first Congolese photographer for Congopresse in 1956. After Congopresse closed in 1968, he worked as a freelancer and established his own studio. He died in 2006.

== Biography ==
Joseph Makula was born in 1929 in Orientale Province, Belgian Congo. He attended a nursing school in Stanleyville, but enlisted in the Force Publique in Port-Francqui in 1948. The following year he was stationed in Léopoldville, and the editor of the army's newspaper, Sango Ya Biso, tapped him as a photographer for the publication. He was later made a supervisor of a military photographic lab tasked with developing film. He left the army in 1956 and briefly found work at a newspaper, Pourquoi pas l'Avenir.

Later in 1956 or 1957 Makula was hired by Congopresse, the Belgian Congo's official press agency, as its first Congolese photographer. He mainly photographed évolués, educated Congolese who formed an elite social group in the colony. He worked mostly in and around the capital, Léopoldville, taking few photographs in the outlying provinces and never taking pictures of villages. Unlike his European colleagues, Makula took few photographs of official ceremonies or visiting foreign dignitaries.

Following Congolese independence in 1960, Congopresse's European staff departed, and Makula went to Belgium for a training course in photography. When he returned to the Congo, he trained a new group of Congolese photographers for the agency, including its only woman photographer, Mpate Sulia. In 1968, Congopresse closed down and Mukula became a freelance photographer. He set up his own photo studio, Photo Mak, in Lemba, Kinshasa, in 1981. It operated until 1991. He died in 2006.

== Sources ==
- Geary, Christraud M.; Pluskota, Krzysztof (2003). In and Out of Focus: Images from Central Africa, 1885-1960. London: Palgrave Macmillan. ISBN 9780856675522.
- Fall, N'Goné; Lyé Mudaba Yoka (2001). "Kinshasa photographies". Revue Noire (in French). 36. ISBN 9782909571539.
- Colard, Sandrine (2018). "The Afterlife of a Colonial Photographic Archive: The Subjective Legacy of InforCongo". Journal of African Art History and Visual Culture. 12 (2): 117–139. doi:10.1080/19301944.2018.1492280. S2CID 166543261.
