= Guy Bomanyama-Zandu =

Belgian filmmaker

- Born: 22 November 1972 (age 53); Kinshasa, Zaire
- Occupation: Film director
- Known for: Mayasi, taximan à Kinshasa

Guy Bomanyama-Zandu (born 22 November 1972) is a filmmaker from the DRC.

== Early years ==
Guy Bomanyama-Zandu was born in Kinshasa on 22 November 1972. In the late 1980s he moved with his family to Brussels, obtaining Belgian citizenship. He first studied electronics, and then film at the Institut de radioélectricité et de cinématographie (INRACI) in Brussels, graduating in 2000. He made his first documentary, Papa Mobutu (2000) at INRACI. It was selected for the Namur Francophone Film Festival. Almost all his films were presented at the Afrika Film Festival à Louvain en Belgique.

== Later work ==
After leaving INRACI Bomanyama-Zandu started his own production company, Ateliers de Production des Films du Congo (APFC), now called Zandu Films, based in Kinshasa and Brussels. In 2001 he made a documentary on Gbadolite, the former stronghold of Mobutu Sese Seko in the region of the DRC, later controlled by Jean-Pierre Bemba. The film recorded testimonies about the atrocities committed by the forces of Mobutu, and then by troops from Chad and Uganda. He was forced to leave this film in the hands of Bemba's security service.

In 2003 Bomanyama-Zandu made Congo je te pleure, a 54-minute documentary co-production between Zandu Movies Brussels and Zandu Movies sprl, which he founded that year in Kinshasa, and was the first production company officially recognized by the Congolese Ministry of Culture. The film was made with the collaboration of Congolese National Radio and Television and was supported by the Congolese Ministry of Culture. The film ranged between the colonial past and the modern Congo, exposing young Congolese to a period of their history that was almost completely unknown to them.

Bomanyama-Zandu created Mayasi, Taximan a Kinshasa in 2004, and a series of short films dealing with the protection and enhancement of the Congolese film heritage. Mayasi, Taximan in Kinshasa is a docudrama that records a day in the life of an old mechanic and taxi driver in Kinshasa. Born in 1938, Mayasi drove coaches in the colonial era. He tells how the city and especially public transport has deteriorated over the years. Along the way the director portrays aspects of everyday life in Kinshasa, a city of about eight million people. His 2005 Film La Vertu deals with Marie, who is raped when she is 15 years old. She is refused an abortion by a doctor, and resorts to an illegal abortion. The police start an investigation of the case, assigning it to the inspector who raped Marie. The film was shown in the 2006 International Festival of Film of Amiens.

== Filmography ==
Bomanyama-Zandu's films include:

Year	Title	Role
2005	Grand écran à Kinshasa, est-ce possible? (documentary)	Director
2005	Le Congo, quel cinéma! (The Congo, What Cinema!)	Director
2005	La Mémoire du Congo en péril (The memory of the Congo in peril)	Director
2005	La Vertu	Director, Producer, Writer
2004	Mayasi, taximan à Kinshasa (Mayasi, taxi driver in Kinshasa)	Director
2001	A Fou	Director
2000	Papa Mobutu (documentary)	Director
