= Identity Pieces =

- Movie poster
- Directed by: Mwezé Ngangura
- Written by: Mwezé Ngangura
- Produced by: Mwezé Ngangura
- Cinematography: Jacques Besse
- Edited by: France Duez; Ingrid Ralet
- Music by: Jean-Louis Daulne; Papa Wemba
- Distributed by: California Newsreel (USA)
- Release dates: 14 September 1998 (Canada); 15 January 1999 (USA); 19 May 1999 (Belgium); 26 July 2000 (France)
- Running time: 97 minutes
- Countries: Belgium; France; Democratic Republic of the Congo
- Languages: French; English; Dutch; Lingala; Kingwana; Kikongo; Tshiluba

Identity Pieces (French: Pièces d'identités) is a 1998 Belgian/French/Congolese comedy film written and directed by Mwezé Ngangura. It premiered at the 1998 Toronto International Film Festival.

== Plot ==
Mani Kongo (Gérard Essomba) is the king of the Bakongo. His only daughter, Mwana (Dominique Mesa), left for Belgium as a young child in hopes of becoming a doctor, but contact with her had been lost over the past few years. Mani Kongo decides to travel to Belgium in search of his beloved daughter. On arriving he will have to cope with the very best and the very worst of the black diaspora, as well as with prejudices rampant in European society. He himself will find good friends amongst poor low-class whites.

== Cast ==
- Gérard Essomba as Mani Kongo
- Dominique Mesa as Mwana
- Jean-Louis Daulne as Chaka-Jo
- Herbert Flack as Jefke
- David Steegen as Van Loo
- Cecilia Kankonda as Safi
- Thilombo Lubambu as Mayele
- Mwanza Goutier as Viva-Wa-Viva (as Mouanza Goutier)
- Nicola Donato as Jos

== Awards ==
Identity Pieces won several awards at the 1999 Panafrican Film and Television Festival, including the grand prize. It also won the People's Choice Award at the Denver International Film Festival.
