= Balufu Bakupa-Kanyinda =

Belgian film director (born 1957)

- Born: 30 October 1957 (age 68); Kinshasa
- Occupation: Film maker
- Known for: Juju Factory

Balufu Bakupa-Kanyinda (born 30 October 1957) is a filmmaker from the Democratic Republic of the Congo.

== Career ==
Balufu Bakupa-Kanyinda was born on 30 October 1957 in Kinshasa. He studied sociology, history and philosophy in Brussels, Belgium. He took courses in filmmaking in France, the United Kingdom and the United States. From 1979 to 1981 he was an instructor in the French Cultural Centre in Lubumbashi. In 1991 he made his first documentary, Dix mille ans de cinéma, and in 1993 released a second documentary on Thomas Sankara. His first fiction film was Le Damier – Papa national oyé! (The Draughtsmen Clash) made in 1996.

He was a member of the board of short films at CNC in France from 1999 to 2001. Balufu was a member of the Input 2000 (International Public Television) in Cape Town, South Africa and a member of CreaTV, Unesco's program for televisions in the South between 2000 and 2003. Bakupa-Kanyinda is a writer and a poet as well as a film director. New York University invited him to lecture in 2006/2007 at the NYU-Ghana campus in Accra. Balufu is a founding member of the Guild of African filmmakers and producers.

In 2015 Bakupa-Kanyinda was featured in La Belle at the Movies, a documentary by Cecilia Zoppolletto about the history and disappearance of Congolese cinema, and said he was working to establish a film school and work towards sending entries to international film festivals. "Cinema is an important art: it’s the art of telling the world about yourself,” he said.

== Recognition and awards ==
Balufu Bakupa-Kanyinda's film Le Damier – Papa national oyé (1996) received important prizes such as the ACCT prize - Agence de la Francophonie, Fespaco 1997 in Burkina Faso, the Reel Black Talent Award in Toronto, Canada in 1997, the Grand Prize at the Festival de Villeurbanne in France 1997, the Quality prize from CNC in France in 1998 and several prizes at the Festival international du Film Francophone at Namur in 1998. Article 15 bis (1999) won a Jury Mention at the Festival du Court métrage at Clermont-Ferrand, France. 2000, Jury Mention at the Festival International du Film Francophone in Namur, Belgique, 2000, Bronze Medal at the Journées Cinématographiques de Carthage in Carthage, Tunisia, 2000 and other prizes. AFRO@DIGITAL gained a Jury Mention at the Zimbabwe International Film Festival in Harare, Zimbabwe, 2004.

== Filmography ==
Films directed by Bakupa-Kanyinda include:

Year	Title	Notes
1991	Dix mille ans de cinéma	Short documentary 13 minutes. Scolopendra Productions, France
1993	Thomas Sankara	Documentary 26 minutes. Channel Four, UK.,
1996	Le Damier – Papa national oyé! (The Draughtsmen Clash)	Fiction 40 minutes
1999	Bongo libre...	Documentary 26 minutes
1999	Watt	Fiction 19 minutes
1999	Balangwa Nzembo (l’ivresse de la musique congolaise)	Documentary 52 minutes
2002	Afro@Digital	Documentary
2002	Article 15 bis	Fiction 15 minutes
2007	Juju Factory	Drama
2009	We Too Walked on the Moon	Short drama 16 minutes

In 2014, he co-produced the "Miss Vodacom" show in Kinshasa.

== Private life ==
Balufu Bakupa Kanyinda was born on 30 October 1957. After studying in Brussels, in Paris and in America, he became the talented film maker he is today. He has four sons, named Joel, David, Arthur, and Oscar, and a daughter called Anne. Currently, he lives between Belgium and Democratic Republic of the Congo but, due to his work, he travels a lot.
