= List of Democratic Republic of the Congo artists =

The following list of Democratic Republic of the Congo artists (in alphabetical order by last name) includes artists of various genres, who are notable and are either born in Democratic Republic of the Congo, of Democratic Republic of the Congo descent or who produce works that are primarily about that country.

== A ==
- Sinzo Aanza (born 1990), visual artist, writer and playwright

== B ==
- Baloji (born 1978), rapper and film director
- Sammy Baloji (born 1978), photographer
- Machérie Ekwa Bahango (born 1993), filmmaker
- Balufu Bakupa-Kanyinda (born 1957), filmmaker
- Moridja Kitenge Banza (born 1980), painter, photographer, filmmaker, drawer, collagist, installation artist, and performance artist
- Barly Baruti (born 1959)
- Mars Kadiombo Yamba Bilonda (1958-2021), actor, screenwriter, and film director
- Bodo (painter) (1953–2015), painter, Christian pastor
- Rene Bokoko, painter
- Vitshois Mwilambwe Bondo (born 1981), painter, sculptor, curator
- Guy Bomanyama-Zandu (born 1972), filmmaker

== D ==
- Depara (1928–1997; also known as Lemvo Jean Abou Bakar Depara), Angolan-born Congolese photographer
- Serge Diantantu (1960-2022)

== H ==
- Claude Haffner (born 1976), filmmaker
- Dieudo Hamadi (born 1984), filmmaker

== I ==
- Mamadi Indoka (born 1976), director and screenwriter

== K ==
- Eddy Kamuanga Ilunga (born 1991), contemporary painter
- Tshibumba Kanda-Matulu (1947–c. 1981), genre painter
- Alain Kassanda, film maker, film director and cinematographer
- Kiripi Katembo (1979–2015), photographer, documentary filmmaker, and painter
- Petna Ndaliko Katondolo (born 1974), filmmaker, activist, educator, and farmer
- Bodys Isek Kingelez (1948–2015), self-taught sculptor
- Princess Odette Maniema Krempin (1973-2016)
- Josef Kumbela (born 1958), actor and filmmaker
- Laura Kutika (born 1984), film director and writer

== L ==
- Zeka Laplaine (born 1960), director and actor
- Cheik Ledy (1962–1997), sign painter and fine art painter
- Gosette Lubondo (born 1993), photographer
- André Lufwa (1925–2020), sculptor

== M ==
- Christophe Madihano (born 1995), commercial photographer, author, film producer, and illustrator
- Michèle Magema (born 1977), Congolese-born French video artist, performance artist, and photographer
- Joseph Makula (1929–2006), photographer, photojournalist
- Papa Mfumu'Eto 1er (born 1963)
- JP Mika (born 1980; Jean-Paul Nsimba Mika), drawer
- Moké (1950–2001; also known as Monsengwo Kejwamfi), painter
- Albert Mongita (1916-1985), painter, actor, dramatist, filmmaker, and theatre director
- Moseka Yogo Ambake (1956–2019), Congolese-born painter who later lived and worked in Brussels, Belgium
- Aimé Mpane (born 1968), painter and sculptor
- Pilipili Mulongoy (1914-2007), painter, also known as Pili Pili Mulongoy
- Fifi Mukuna (born 1968)
- Djo Tunda Wa Munga (born 1972), film director and producer
- Guy Kabeya Muya (born 1970), film director

== N ==
- Ngongo ya Chintu, 19th-c. sculptor of Luba art
- Rigobert Nimi (born 1965), sculptor and painter

== N ==
- Mwezé Ngangura (born 1950), film director
- Ne Kunda Nlaba (born 1982), film producer, director, screenwriter, actor, and political scientist

== P ==
- Monique Mbeka Phoba (born 1962), filmmaker

== S ==
- Chéri Samba (born 1956), contemporary painter

== T ==
- Freddy Tsimba (born 1967), sculptor
- Pamela Tulizo (born 1994), photographer, journalist

== W ==
- Jean-Michel Kibushi Ndjate Wooto (born 1957), stop motion animator

== Z ==
- Roger Kwami Mambu Zinga (1943-2004), filmmaker

== See also ==
- Congolese Plantation Workers Art League
- List of people from the Democratic Republic of the Congo
