= Mohammad Omer Khalil =

Sudanese visual artist (born 1936)

- محمد عمر خليل
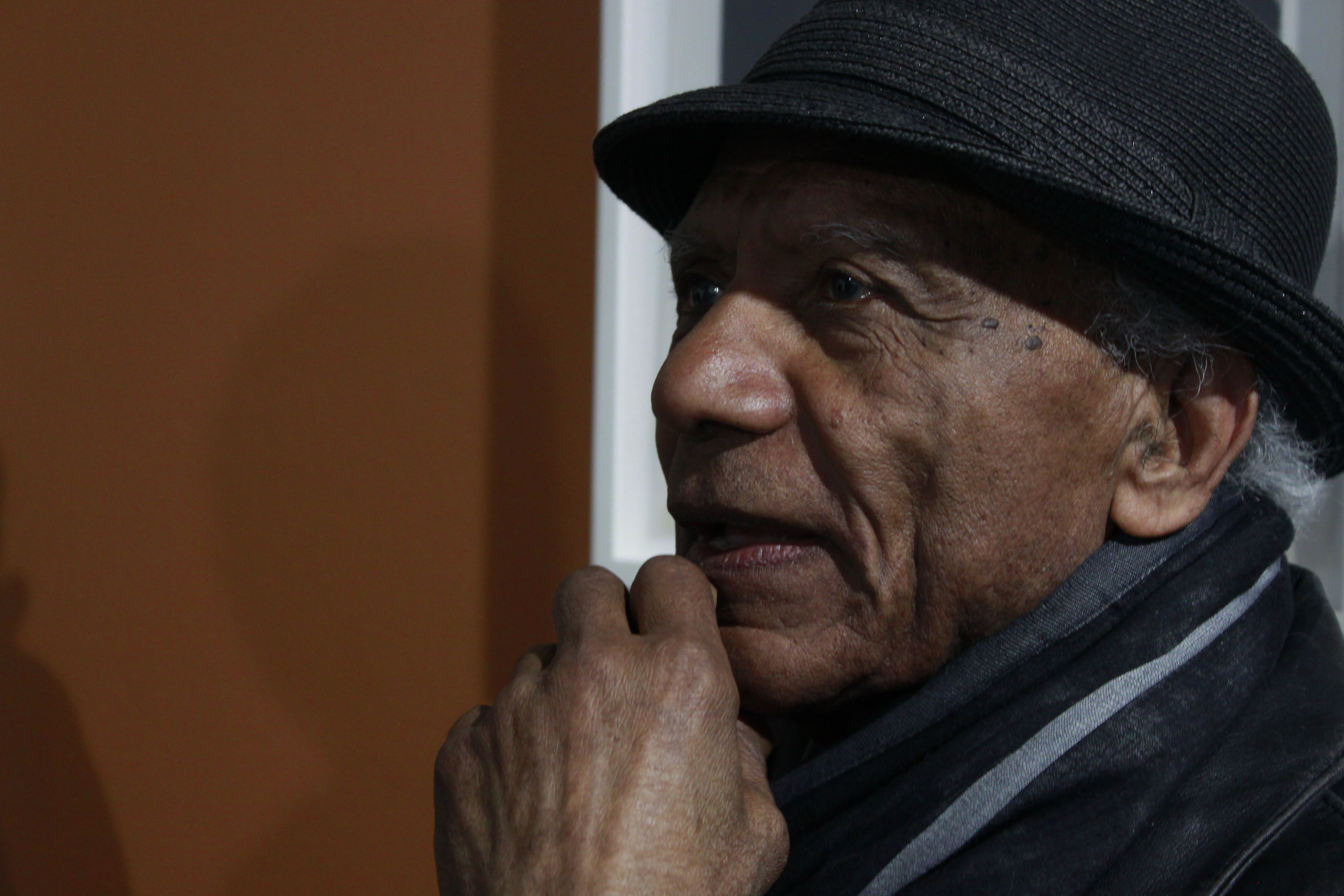
- Born: January 8, 1936 (age 90); Khartoum, Anglo-Egyptian Sudan
- Education: School of Fine and Applied Arts; Accademia di Belle Arti di Firenze; Academy of Fine Arts (Ravenna)
- Known for: Painting, mosaics, etching, and printmaking
- Awards: 2019 Nile Award for Arab Innovators by Egypt's Supreme Council for Culture
- Website: mokhalil.art

Mohammad Omer Khalil (Arabic: محمد عمر خليل, English: Mohammad Omer Khalil, born January 8, 1936) is a Sudanese-born artist living in New York City. Born in a neighborhood of Khartoum, Khalil later studied at the School of Fine and Applied Arts, where he taught after graduating. He moved to Italy to attend the Accademia di Belle Arti di Firenze where he studied painting, mosaics, painting frescos, and etching. He continued his studies in mosaics at the Accademia di Belle Arti di Firenze in Florence and the Academy of Fine Arts in Ravenna. Khalil moved back to Sudan where he briefly taught. He migrated to the United States of America in 1967.

After moving to New York City, Khalil became an expert in printmaking and later opened a studio where his clients included Norman Lewis, Louise Nevelson, Al Held, and Sean Scully. He began teaching at Pratt Institute in 1973, the first of many schools where he has taught in the US. Khalil's works gained in popularity, especially in North America and Europe. His first solo exhibition took place in 1979. This was followed by decades of success and exhibitions in Africa, Asia, Europe, and North America.

== Biography ==
=== Early life ===
Mohammad Omer Khalil was born on January 8, 1936, in Burri Almahas, a neighborhood of Khartoum, then part of Anglo-Egyptian Sudan (modern-day Sudan). After graduating from Khartoum's School of Fine and Applied Arts in 1959 where he studied under Greek artist Aristomenis Angelopoulos, he taught at the school for the next four years. Khalil moved to Italy to study painting and mosaics at the Accademia di Belle Arti di Firenze (ABAF) in Florence. He was able to attend the academy due to receiving a scholarship from the Sudanese Ministry of Education. At ABAF, Kahlil studied fresco painting under Primo Conti. He also took classes in etching under Rodolfo Margheri. After graduating, he studied mosaics at the Academy of Fine Arts in Ravenna in 1966.

=== Career ===
==== 1960s to 1980s ====
After leaving Italy, Kahlil briefly taught at the Khartoum Technical Institute in Sudan before emigrating to the United States in 1967, becoming an expert in printmaking. Khalil's works gained popularity, part of a new wave of African art that reached Europe and North America. In 1970, he opened a printing atelier, where he began printing editions for renowned artists, including Emma Amos, Romare Bearden, Jim Dine, Al Held, Norman Lewis, Louise Nevelson, and Sean Scully.

Inno (1966)

La Chiesa (1966)

He taught etching at Pratt Institute starting in 1973, the first of several schools of higher learning where he has taught. Other schools include Columbia University, New York University, The New School and the Parsons School of Design. In addition to teaching at these schools, Khalil spent much time teaching in New York City at the Robert Blackburn Printmaking Workshop and the Asilah Printmaking Workshop in Asilah.

Khalil's travels throughout the Arab world and his time spent in Italy and New York City have greatly influenced his works. It was in Morocco where his first solo exhibition took place in 1979 at the Galerie Basamat in Casablanca. This was followed by solo exhibitions at The New School in 1981, and New York City's Limited Art Editions in 1984. That same year he was part of group exhibitions at the El Paso Museum of Art, Tacoma Art Museum, Washington Seventh Norwegian Print Biennial, and the African American Museum in Dallas.

In 1985, Khalil created a series of etchings called Homage to Miro, inspired by Joan Miró's distaste for conventional art. That same year he participated in group exhibitions at the International Triennial of Original Graphic Prints in Grenchen, Switzerland, the Toledo Museum of Art in Ohio, and the Columbia Museum of Art in South Carolina. During the rest of the decade, Khalil's work was shown in Iraq, the United Kingdom, and Norway. Solo exhibitions during this time include ones at the Alif Gallery in Washington, D.C., the Eleini Gallery in London, and the Bronx Museum of the Arts in New York City.

Khalil is a fan of Bob Dylan's music and in 1986, created a seven-part series of etchings with aquatint prints inspired by Dylan's music. Describing the inspiration for these pieces, Khalil said "I listened to Dylan every day...at a point in my life [when] there was an empathy with the sadness and anger in Dylan's life and music." One of these prints, Tangled Up in Blue, was later purchased by the National Museum of African Art in Washington, D.C. Although the series was inspired by Dylan, they show scenes in Sudan, including one of Suakin.

Another series in 1989-1990 was inspired by Petra. Responding to these etchings, Sylvia Williams wrote: "When asked about the caves, [Khalil] commented that he wanted to convey the mystery and ambiguity of suggesting whether one is looking into darkness or looking out into light. Kahlil often speaks of light and dark as a series of positive and negative effects that he wants to capture. It seems to sum up not only his pictorial vocabulary but also his philosophy of life."

==== 1990s to present ====
During the 1990s, Khalil's works were shown in group exhibitions at the International Monetary Fund Center in Washington, D.C., the Herbert F. Johnson Museum of Art in New York and the Osaka Triennial of Prints in Osaka, where he won the bronze prize. Solo exhibitions included ones at the Alif Gallery, Galerie Teinturerie and Institut du Monde Arabe in Paris, and the Al-Wasiti Gallery in Amman.

A major exhibition took place in 1994-1995 at the National Museum of African Art where Khalil's works, sculptures by Amir Nour, and "book art" by Atta Kwami were displayed. Describing Khalil's work in The Washington Post, a reporter wrote Khalil's artistic style "equally embraces America's Bob Dylan and Jordan's ruined Petra." Writing in the Nka Journal of Contemporary African Art, Robert Condon said Khalil and Nour's works "challenges all perceived notions of what abstraction connotes" and noted Khalil uses photographs on his etchings to give the appearance of paintings.

Inspired by the notable Arabic poet Adunis, in 1999 Khalil created the Harlem series, which featured etchings of poems. He won first prize in printmaking in 2001 and 2003 at the National Academy of Design, and in 2003 at the International Bienneal in Cairo. His group exhibitions during the 2000s were shown at the Skoto Gallery in New York City, the Institute du Monde Arabe in Paris, the Kunsthalle Darmstadt in Darmstadt, the British Museum in London, the Arab American National Museum in Michigan, the Albareh Art Gallery in Bahrain, and the Virginia Commonwealth University in Qatar.

His solo exhibitions in the 2000s took place at the Rochan Gallery in Jeddah, the Skoto Gallery, the Hassan II Centre for International Encounters in Asilah, and the Albareh Art Gallery. This was followed by a group exhibition in 2010 at the Mathaf: Arab Museum of Modern Art in Doha, and solo exhibitions at the Albareh Art Gallery, the Meem Gallery in Dubai, and the Aicon Gallery in New York City during the 2010s. Khalil was awarded the 2019 Nile Award for Arab Innovators by Egypt's Supreme Council for Culture.

In the late 2010s and early 2020s, students from Fisk University restored eleven paintings, including Inno by Khalil. The works are part of a traveling exhibition, African Modernism in America, that was held at various museums in the United States. Other artists represented in the exhibition included Skunder Boghossian, Ibrahim El-Salahi, Mohamed Melehi, Aimé Mpane, Pilipili Mulongoy, and Suzanna Ogunjami, among others. A solo exhibition of Khalil's work took place in 2023-2024 at Washington and Lee University and the exhibition Common Ground, named after a series of Khalil's etchings, was held at multiple galleries in 2026.

== See also ==
- African art in Western collections
- Contemporary African art
- List of Sudanese artists
- Visual arts of Sudan
