= Aimé Mpane =

Congolese painter (born 1968)

- Born: 1968 (age 57–58); Democratic Republic of the Congo
- Occupation: Painter

Aimé Mpane (born 1968) is an artist from the Democratic Republic of the Congo (DRC) who divides his time between Brussels and Kinshasa. Born during the regime of Mobutu Sese Seko, his early life in the DRC and the atrocities committed by King Leopold II and the Belgians have heavily influenced his work. His art also depicts the culture of the DRC and the relationship between Europe and Africa. Mpane has been called "one of the most important artists of African origin to this day" and has participated in solo and group exhibitions in Africa, Europe, and North America. He uses an adze to create his sculptures and often works at night or by candlelight.

His work in creating a sculpture in the Royal Museum for Central Africa, now called the AfricaMuseum, to replace a statue of Leopold that was removed during a major renovation was covered in many articles. His work, New Breath, or the Burgeoning Congo, was meant to "balance" the racist statues and imagery found in the museum's Great Rotunda. There was continued criticism that it and other changes made throughout the museum did not fully address the museum's racist history. A second sculpture was added, and, working with a Belgian artist, Mpane added semi-transparent veils in front of the statues in a project called RE/STORE.

Mpane is a humanist who adheres to the Ubuntu philosophy. He believes that instead of arguing over past events, Europeans and Africans should "restore, not repair," their relationship. An example of this is a sculpture made in front of the Belgian embassy in Kinshasa that depicts a black man greeting a white man. Mpane has been critical of the Black Lives Matter movement, saying he does not agree with its tactics.

== Early life ==
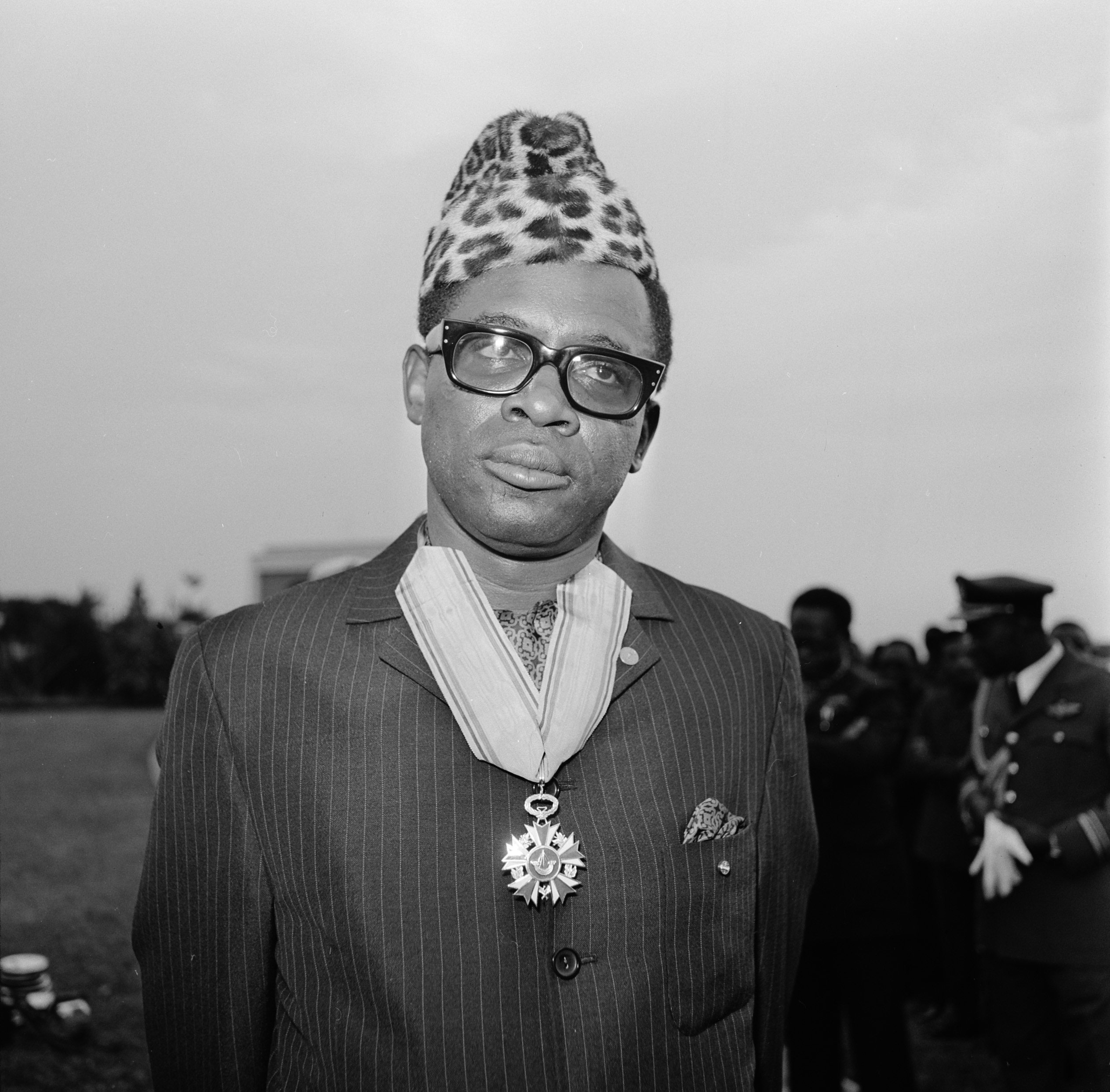
Mpane was born during the rule of military dictator Mobutu Sese Seko, which heavily influences his works.

Aimé Mpane was born in 1968 in modern-day Democratic Republic of the Congo (DRC), a few years after the Congo Crisis had ended and during the rule of military dictator Mobutu Sese Seko. His father was a cabinetmaker and sculptor, and his grandfather also worked with wood. In school, Mpane was taught from history books published by Belgian publishers. The books portrayed King Leopold II, who was responsible for the deaths of millions of Congo Free State citizens, as a great leader. Mpane was also taught that the Congolese were descended from the Gauls. This was the supposed reason Belgians had been their rulers.

Mpane moved to Kinshasa when he was 15. Shortly after his arrival, he was asked to draw images for banners promoting films. The banners were on display for months, which Mpane calls his first exhibition. He later attended school at the Institut des Beaux-Arts, where he graduated in sculpture work in 1987. He earned his Bachelor of Fine Arts at the Académie des Beaux-Arts in 1990.

In 1994, Mpane moved to Belgium, where he continued his studies and earned his first award at a fair hall in Libramont-Chevigny. He was curious what Belgians thought of his homeland and its people. He visited the Royal Museum for Central Africa, now known as the AfricaMuseum, and saw the Congolese portrayed as savage people who needed help from white Belgians. The Belgian king and missionaries were portrayed as benevolent heroes. At the same time, he was impressed with the amount of works and was very interested in the African tribal art on display. He had only been taught about postcolonial art and Western art due to Mobutu's policy of authenticité. For him, Mpane was "in the presence of 'real' Congolese patrimony."

Mpane was awarded first place at a 1996 Centre International des Civilisations Bantu competition, representing the DRCH. He earned his Master of Fine Arts from the École Nationale Supérieure des Arts Visuels in 2000. By that time, he had already participated in several group exhibitions, including several in Belgium and one in Canada, and solo exhibitions in Belgium and the DRC.

== Career ==
Mpane's work is inspired by the relations between the DRC and Belgium, specifically the time during the Congo Free State and the way racism has played a large role in them. His work also addresses the DRC's culture and the history of Mobutu's effect on the DRC. Mpane often works at night or by candlelight, using an adze to sculpt his humanistic works. In addition to typical sculpture work, Mpane carves portraits into wood, creates mosaic wall hangings, and paints. He has been called "one of the most important artists of African origin to this day" by the Royal Museums of Fine Arts of Belgium and BRUZZ.

An article in the journal, Black Renaissance/Renaissance Noire, published by New York University's Institute of African American Affairs, began with this summary of Mpane's work:

"Aimé Mpané's work embodies the pain and grace of human conflict that draws from an informed political consciousness and an awareness of Africa's colonial history. His work indicts the social and political reality around him, a reality shaped by his perspective as a leading artist of his generation whose work continues to help shape perceptions about the aesthetic and cultural character of the African continent. The history of his homeland - Democratic Republic of Congo - with the brutalities instigated during the 19th century by King Leopold II of Belgium, continuing through die legacy of colonialism and the ensuing ravages of war and economic missteps in the postcolonial period, leaves deep and tragic residuals of trauma in the memory of the Congolese people."

=== 2000s ===
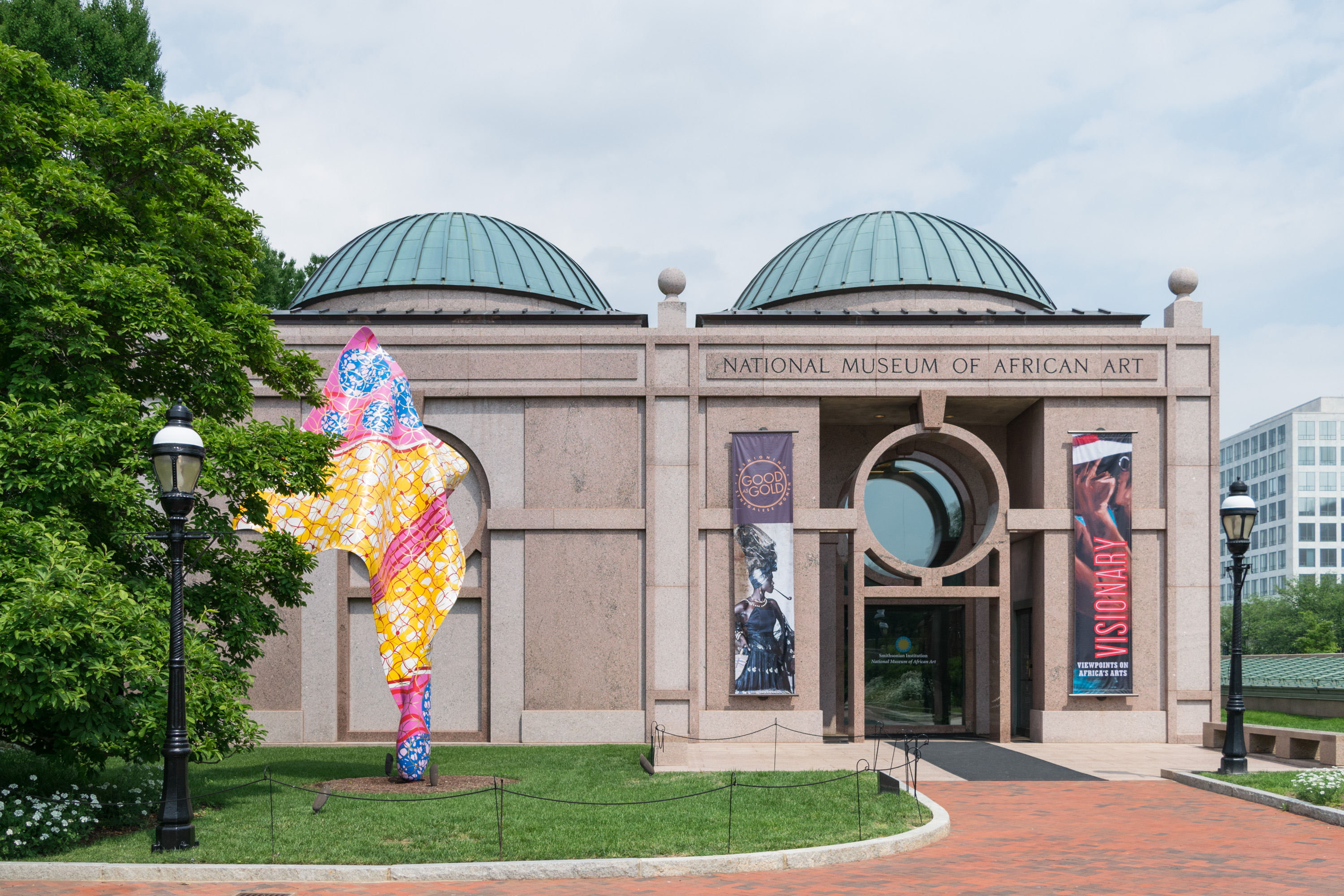
Mpane's exhibition with António Ole took place at the National Museum of African Art in 2009.

After graduating in 2000, Mpane participated in group exhibitions during the following years in Belgium, Monaco, France, Cuba, Germany, and Senegal. Some of his first solo exhibitions took place in Lubumbashi, the 8th Havana Biennial, the Dakar Biennale, where he won the 2006 Jean-Paul Blachère Foundation's Critics Prize, and New York City. The latter, "Bach to Congo", took place at the Skoto Gallery in 2007. The Village Voice noted his works' use of shadow play and a grave that reads "Congo-1885", the year the Berlin Conference took place, when European countries decided how to carve up Africa for their respective empires. The New York Times called it a "strong solo" by Mpane, noting the figure of a man from Africa which is composed entirely of 4,652 matchsticks. It was also noted one of the reasons his works are often done at night is because of electricity blackouts in Kinshasa, where Mpane lives when not in Brussels.

During the next two years, Mpane began teaching and was featured in group exhibitions in Belgium, France, and Washington, D.C., and solo exhibitions in Belgium, Houston, and New York City. The exhibition in Washington, D.C., "Artists in Dialogue: Antonion Ole and Aimé Mpane", took place at the National Museum of African Art and included works by Mpane created between 2006 and 2008. An article in The Washington Post described not only his sculptures, but paintings, as having a "3D quality." Some of the reviewed works included Ice On Creve and Rail, Massina 3, the latter named after a Kinshasa commercial strip. The author described Mpane's works as the following: "The images of human faces are not just painted, but scraped with a blade into the cheap plywood he works with -- in some cases so energetically that nothing is left but a gaping hole where the face would be. In such instances, you don't see the inner person at all, but the wall on which the picture is hung."

=== 2010s ===
Mpane won The Dorothy and Herbert Vogel Prize from The Phillips Collection in 2012 for his work, Mapasa.

In the early-to-mid 2010s, Mpane had solo exhibitions in Kinshasa, New York City, Brussels, San Francisco, and the University of Wyoming. His group exhibitions included ones in New York City, Paris, Brussels, Los Angeles, Dakar, Kansas City, and San Antonio. Mpane's exhibition at the French Cultural Center in Kinshasa took place soon before the DRC's 50th anniversary of independence and included 60 paintings and a video installation. In 2012, he won The Dorothy and Herbert Vogel Prize from The Phillips Collection, for his work Mapasa.

During his 2013 solo exhibition in San Francisco, Mpane was interviewed by a reporter for the San Francisco Chronicle. She described Mpane's portraits as reminiscent of Pablo Picasso, who was often inspired by African art. In his painting IC.Cont #65, the Nike Swoosh is on a boy's forehead, which Mpane describes as a symbol of Mobutu's repression of Western influences and his clothing regulations. Mpane noted his works often portray Congolese people as wanting respect and displaying their independence after decades of repression. According to him, Mpane "navigate[s] between two cultures permanently" and is "fundamentally based on identity and wounds in the Congolese memory", especially the stereotypes Belgians have of Africa and its people.

When asked why he works with wood, Mpane told the reporter his family's woodworking had influenced him and that the wood he uses measures 0.0992 square meters (1.07 sq ft). That measurement is the same as the human head's skin surface: "Because my work deals with problems of race and the stereotypes of black people, the three layers within 4-millimeter-thick plywood make me think of the three layers within human skin." The adze Mpane uses "works like a woodpecker that pecks a tree and eats it."

==== AfricaMuseum renovation ====
After years of criticism the Royal Museum for Central Africa received for its portrayal of Africans, the museum closed in 2013 for a major renovation. Changes made to the museum, with assistance from the United Nations Human Rights Council, included renaming it to the AfricaMuseum, highlighting the atrocities committed by Belgians, including the human zoo first created during the 1897 Brussels International Exposition, where white people watched Congolese people live in a recreated "village", and highlighting modern African art. At the encouragement of Guido Gryseels, Mpane entered into a competition to design an artwork that would replace a statue of King Leopold II in the museum's Great Rotunda. Mpane was leery of the idea, thinking it would have no real effect. Nevertheless, he submitted an entry. Mpane said he began to research more of the museum's history and when he thought about the new vision, he thought Congolese people should be involved in the process.

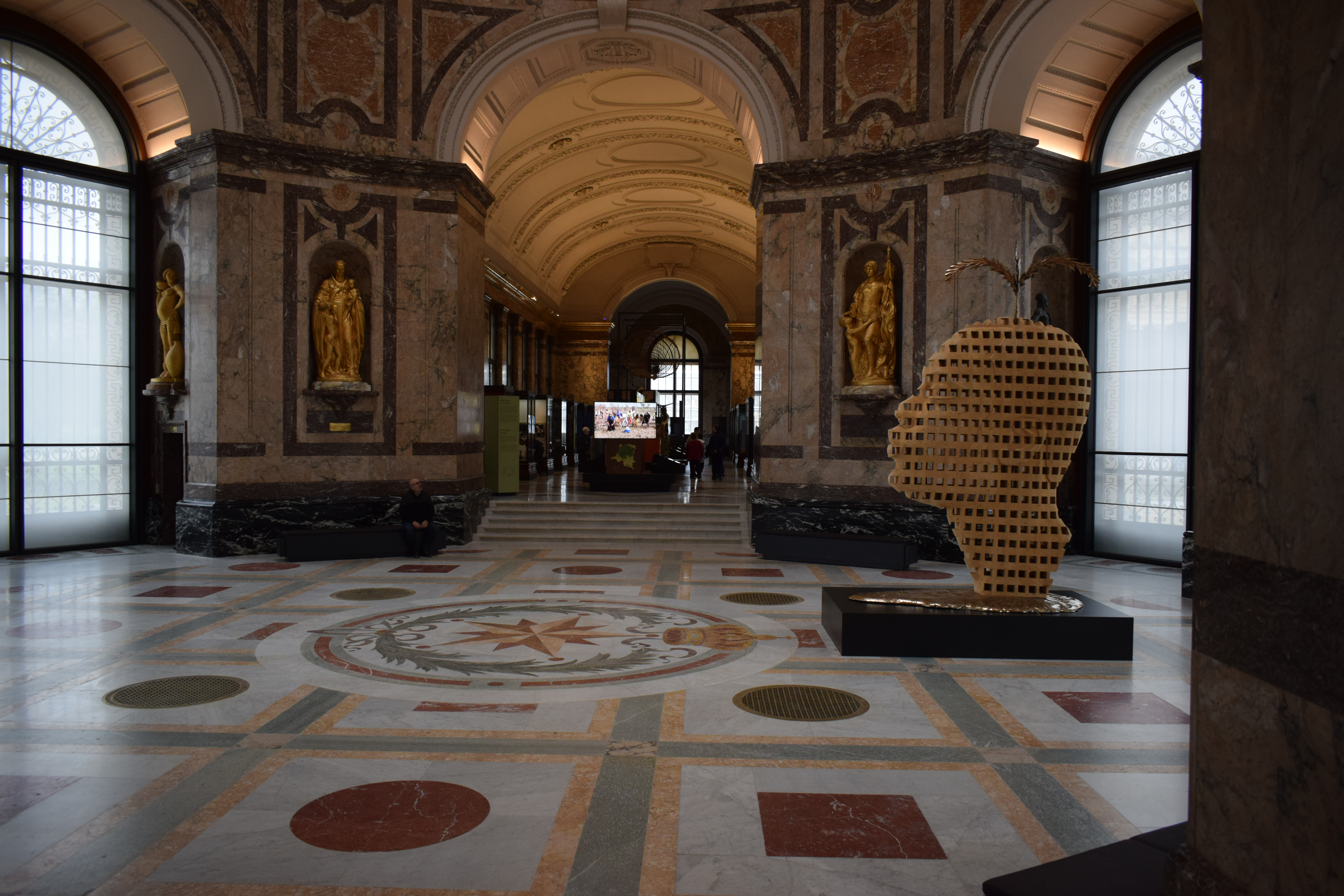
New Breath, or the Burgeoning Congo in 2019, before Skull of Chief Lusinga and the semi-transparent veils over statues were added

His winning sculpture, New Breath, or the Burgeoning Congo, is 4.9 meters (16 ft) tall and depicts an African man's head, made of wood, looking up, placed on a bronze pedestal in the shape of Africa. Mpane says the sculpture, which debuted in December 2018, was a way of "not looking towards the past, but the Congolese looking up, towards a brighter future, for everyone to reconcile the past instead of fighting over it, restoration rather than a repair." Mpane also wants the relationship between Europeans and Africans to be a restoration rather than a repair since, according to him, "a repaired crack will reappear."

The museum's goal with this work was to "balance" the room and to be an "explicit response", which included multiple racist statues, an effort done in other areas of the museum. Because racist statues and symbols are built into the museum's walls, there was continued criticism, including from a United Nations work group, that the new approach did not go far enough. An article in Antiquity said the supposed balance in the Great Rotunda would be lost to most visitors because its purpose was unclear. An article in The Atlantic Monthly was more positive, with the author liking the idea of a balance.

Due to the museum building being protected under heritage laws, museum officials were unable to remove the offending works. Mpane was also one of many to voice support for returning objects in the museum to the DRC, saying it was "a way to recover our identity and stolen memories." Another wooden sculpture by Mpane was added to the Great Rotunda. Skull of Chief Lusinga represents the beheading of Lusinga lwa Ng'ombe in 1884 by a Belgian officer. It stands just under 2 meters (6.6 ft) tall and faces New Breath, or the Burgeoning Congo. To further address the offensive material, Mpane worked with Belgian artist Jean-Pierre Müller on a project called RE/STORE. This entailed placing semi-transparent veils directly in front of 16 racist statues and images. In 2023, the museum removed several statues so that they can only be seen on guided tours.

=== 2020s ===
In 2020, Mpane was awarded at Belgium's Golden Afro Artistic Awards. He continued work with a solo exhibition in Brussels and group exhibitions in New York City, Marseille, and Washington, D.C. The solo in Brussels, "Remedies", was the first time a Congolese artist was exhibited in the Royal Museums of Fine Arts. During the exhibit, museum officials asked Mpane to "revisit" a work. He chose Peter Paul Rubens' Four Studies of a Head of a Moor, which was originally titled Negros Head. In the 1950s, the painting was featured on the back of the 500 Belgian franc with King Leopold II on the front of the currency.

Citing his belief in the Ubuntu philosophy, Mpane has been critical of those who want to rehash past events. He has been open to creating works that are meant to display an openness between Europeans and Africans. He created a sculpture in front of the Belgian embassy in Kinshasa that depicts a black man welcoming a white man. Mpane has been critical of the Black Lives Matter movement, saying he disagreed with its tactics. Summing up his view on how to further heal the racial divide, Mpane said he "prefer[s] Martin Luther King to Malcolm X."

== See also ==
- African art in Western collections
- Contemporary African art
- List of Democratic Republic of the Congo artists
