= Pilipili Mulongoy =

Congolese painter

Pilipili Mulongoy (February 12, 1914–March 10, 2007), also spelled Pili Pili Mulongoy, was an artist from the Democratic Republic of the Congo. He was raised in the Shaba Province of the Belgian Congo and worked as a plumber and building painter during his early adulthood. Following a drawing test at a studio in Élisabethville (modern-day Lubumbashi), Mulongoy honed his craft of painting nature scenes during the next several years. He later taught courses at the Académie des Beaux-Arts in Élisabethville. His work gained popularity in the Belgian Congo and especially Europe. Mulongoy's paintings were acquired by members of the Belgian royal family. Since his death in 2007, Mulongoy's paintings have been shown in several exhibitions in Africa, Europe, and North America.

== Biography ==
Pilipili Mulongoy, also spelled Pili Pili Mulongoy and whose birth name was Mulongoyi Nkulu Mitenga Philippe, was born on February 12, 1914, in Ankoro, a town in the Shaba Province of the Belgian Congo, now known as the Democratic Republic of the Congo (DRC). His father was a fisherman and Mulongoy initially worked as a plumber and building painter. After a drawing test in Élisabethville (modern-day Lubumbashi), French immigrant Pierre Romain Desfosses recruited Mulongoy in 1947. During the next seven years, Mulongoy and other artists including Mwenze Kibwanga and Bela Sara began working at Defsosses' Hangar Workshop (atelier du Hangar) on their individual techniques, with Mulongoy specializing in painting nature scenes, including animals and plants. Following Desfosses' death, the artists moved to the Académie des Beaux-Arts in Élisabethville where Mulongoy began teaching courses.

Mulongoy's work gained popularity in the Belgian Congo, but his art became even more popular in Europe. Among notable people that acquired Mulongoy's paintings were King Albert II, and his brother and sister-in-law King Baudouin and Queen Fabiola.

Journalist Régine Kerzmann said Mulongoy's paintings show an "extreme delicacy and great refinement [that] reveal his mastery of shapes and colors." Writer In Koli Jean Bofane said:

Pilipili Mulongoy, for his part, knows how to affirm nature, not through shimmering hues but thanks to the confidence with which he applies colors and shapes. Each performance is an abundance. At a time of global warming and the disappearance of species, the scenes of abundance in Pilipili Mulongoy appear as scandals. We then wonder if the artists of tomorrow will still be able to represent this generosity of nature.

Mulongoy died on March 10, 2007, in the DRC. At the time of his death, he was 93 and had several unfinished paintings. Exhibitions where his works were shown have taken place at the Hotel Memling in Kinshasa, Fondation Cartier pour l'Art Contemporain in Paris, Artcurial offices in Brussels and Monaco, and The Phillips Collection in Washington, D.C. The solo exhibition at Artcurial featured 15 previously unseen paintings. Live auctions of his work have occurred at the PIASA gallery in Paris in 2018 and 2021, and the Artcurial in 2022.

== Selected works ==
Crocodile Eating Fish (1960)

Snake Amid Flowers (1960)

== See also ==
- African art in Western collections
- Contemporary African art
- List of Democratic Republic of the Congo artists
