= Lukasa =

Memory device of the Luba people

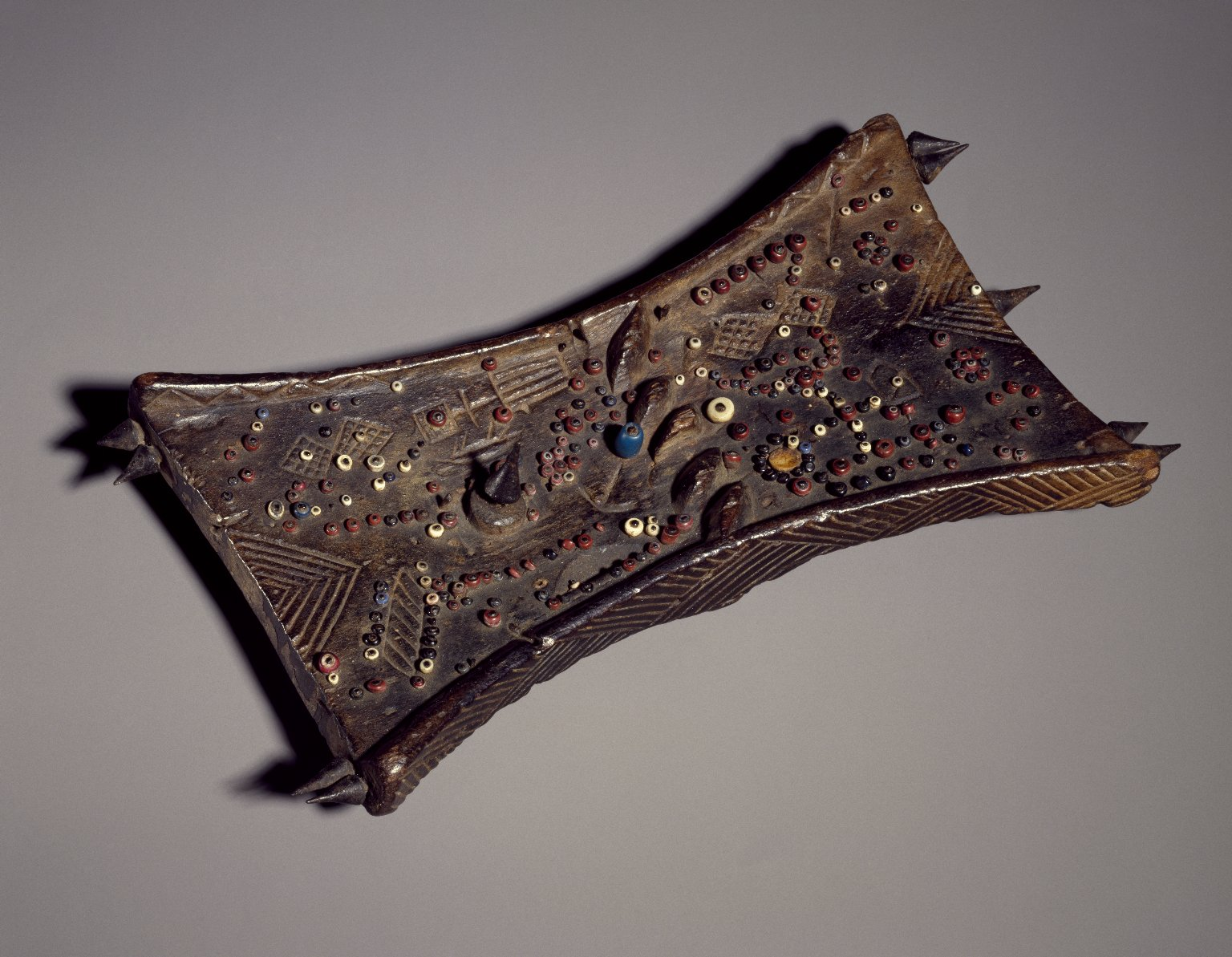
Lukasa memory board, from the collection of the Brooklyn Museum

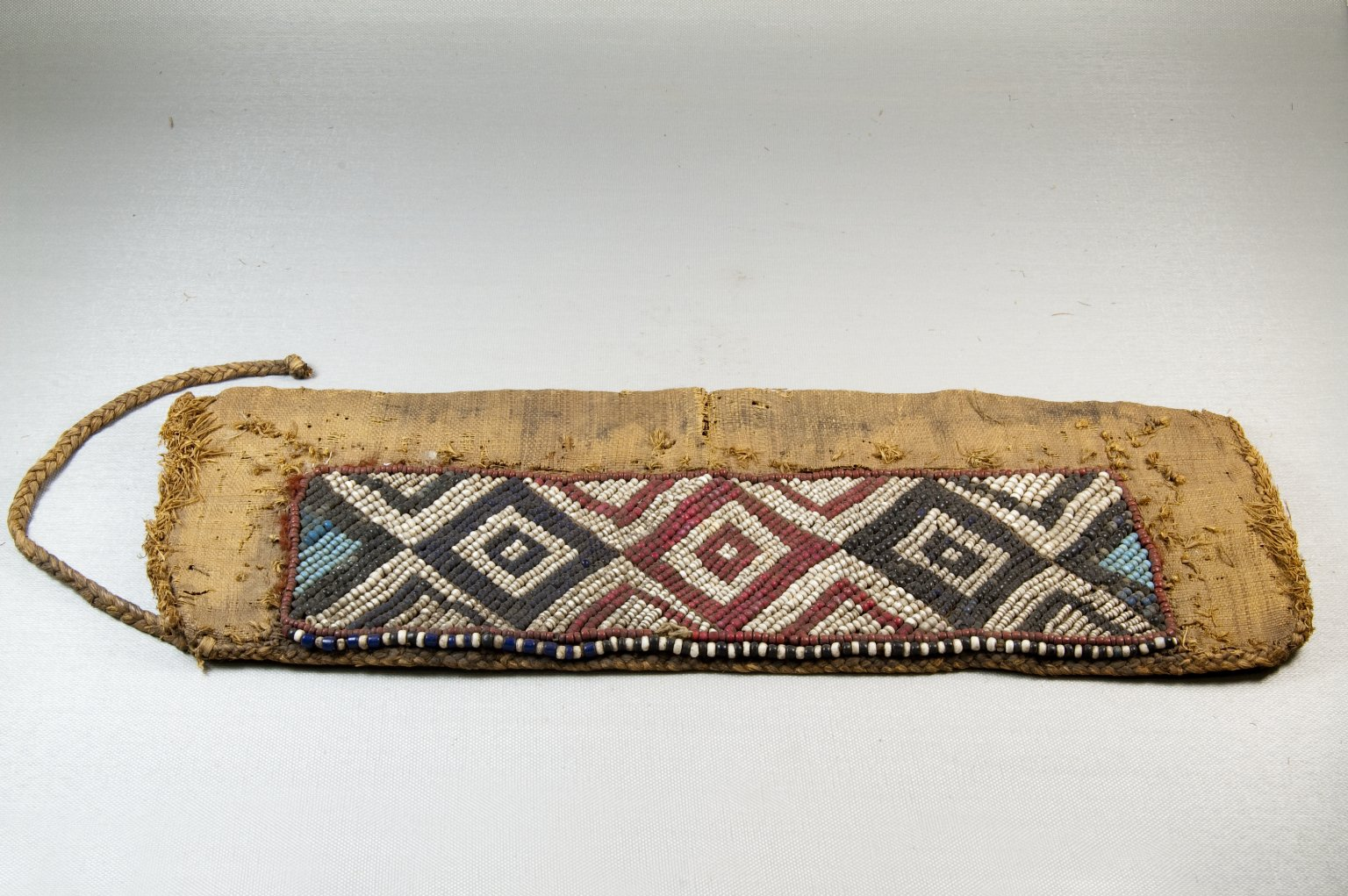
Beadwork Headdress for Mbudye Official, from the collection of the Brooklyn Museum

Lukasa, "the long hand" (or claw), is a memory device that was created, manipulated and protected by the Bambudye, a once powerful secret society of the Luba. Lukasa are examples of Luba art.

== History ==
The story of the lukasa is closely associated with the history of the Luba kingdom, which dominated most of northern Shaba during the eighteenth century and the first half of the nineteenth century. No candidate for political office could receive his title without first becoming a member of the Bambudye society, and the ruler of the Luba kingdom held the highest ranking Bambudye title. Reefe states that while it is not possible to date the origins of the lukasa, the high degree of integration of the lukasa into the structure of the Bambudye society and into the oral lore of the Luba kingdom strongly suggests that this art form is of considerable antiquity.

== Usage ==
Central to Luba artistry, lukasa aids memory and the making of histories. Stools, staffs, figures, and complex choreographies complement the lukasa as Luba culture is remembered, produced, and transformed.

Lukasa memory boards are hourglass-shaped wooden tablets that are covered with multicolored beads, shells and bits of metal, or are incised or embossed with carved symbols. The colors and configurations of beads or ideograms serve to stimulate the recollection of important people, places, things, relationships and events as court historians narrate the origins of Luba authority. A lukasa serves as an archive for the topographical and chronological mapping of political histories and other data sets.

Lukasa are approximately the same size, 20–25 cm (8–10 in) long and about 13 cm (5 in) wide and have the same rectangular dish shape. A row of carved mounds called lukala runs across their concave surface, dividing it in half. Beads and shells are attached to the board by small slivers of wood or hand-made iron wedges driven through their centers, and cowrie shells are frequently attached at the top and bottom. Beads are arranged in three ways: a large bead surrounded by smaller beads, a line of beads, and one isolated bead. Each configuration lends itself to the transmission of certain kinds of information. Board surfaces also have holes and lines cut into them.

Court historians known as bana balute ("men of memory") run their fingertips across the surface of a lukasa or point to its features while reciting genealogies, king lists, maps of protocol, migration stories, and the Luba Epic, a preeminent oral narrative that records how the culture heroes, Mbidi Kiluwe and his son Kalala Ilunga, introduced royal political practices and etiquette. For Luba, how an object looks dictates how well it works.

Culture heroes are identifiable by beads whose colors have a fan of connotations triggering remembrance of their deeds and exploits, as well as their qualities and physical appearance. For example, Nkongolo Mwamba, the tyrannical anti-hero of the Luba charter, is always represented by a red bead, as he is the red-skinned rainbow serpent associated with bloody violence. Blue beads (considered "black") stand for Mbidi Kiluwe, the protagonist and culture-bearer of kingship whose skin is shiningly black like that of a bull buffalo, symbol of ambivalent power and secret potential. The paths of Luba migration and significant events and relationships are indicated by lines and clusters of beads. Chiefs and their counselors, sacred enclosures, and defined places are shown by circles of beads.

== Mbudye ==
Mbudye is a council of men and women charged with sustaining and interpreting the political and historical principles of the Luba state. As authorities on the tenets of Luba society, Mbudye provide a counterbalance to the power of kings and chiefs, checking or reinforcing it as necessary. Members of Mbudye proceed through a series of stages within the society as they master successive levels of arcane knowledge. Only those at the apex of the association can decipher and interpret the lukasa's intricate designs and motifs. Mbudye members call the twin projections sprouting along the board's outer edge the "head" and "tail" of the lukasa, zoomorphic elements that are meant to evoke the crocodile. An animal equally at home on land and in water, the crocodile's dual nature is suggestive of Luba political organization, whose existence relies on the interdependence of the kikungulu (the head of the Mbudye) and the kaloba (the "owner of the land", or chief).

== Types ==
The lukasa fulfilled many mnemonic functions, for it could be interpreted in a number of ways, and while all memory boards shared certain common information, particular types of memory boards communicated specialized data. There were three distinct categories of lukasa, each emphasizing a certain kind of knowledge. First, the lukasa Iwa nkunda, "the long hand of the pigeon", bears information on mythical heroes and early rulers and on the mythical migration routes of the Luba. Second, the lukasa Iwa kabemba, "the long hand of the hawk", is concerned with the organization of the Mbudye society. A third type of memory board was created for the use of individual Luba rulers and contained secret information about divine chiefship. No examples of this type, referred to as the lukasa Iwa kitenta, "the long hand of the sacred pool", still exist.
