= Jean-Michel Kibushi Ndjate Wooto =

Congolese animator

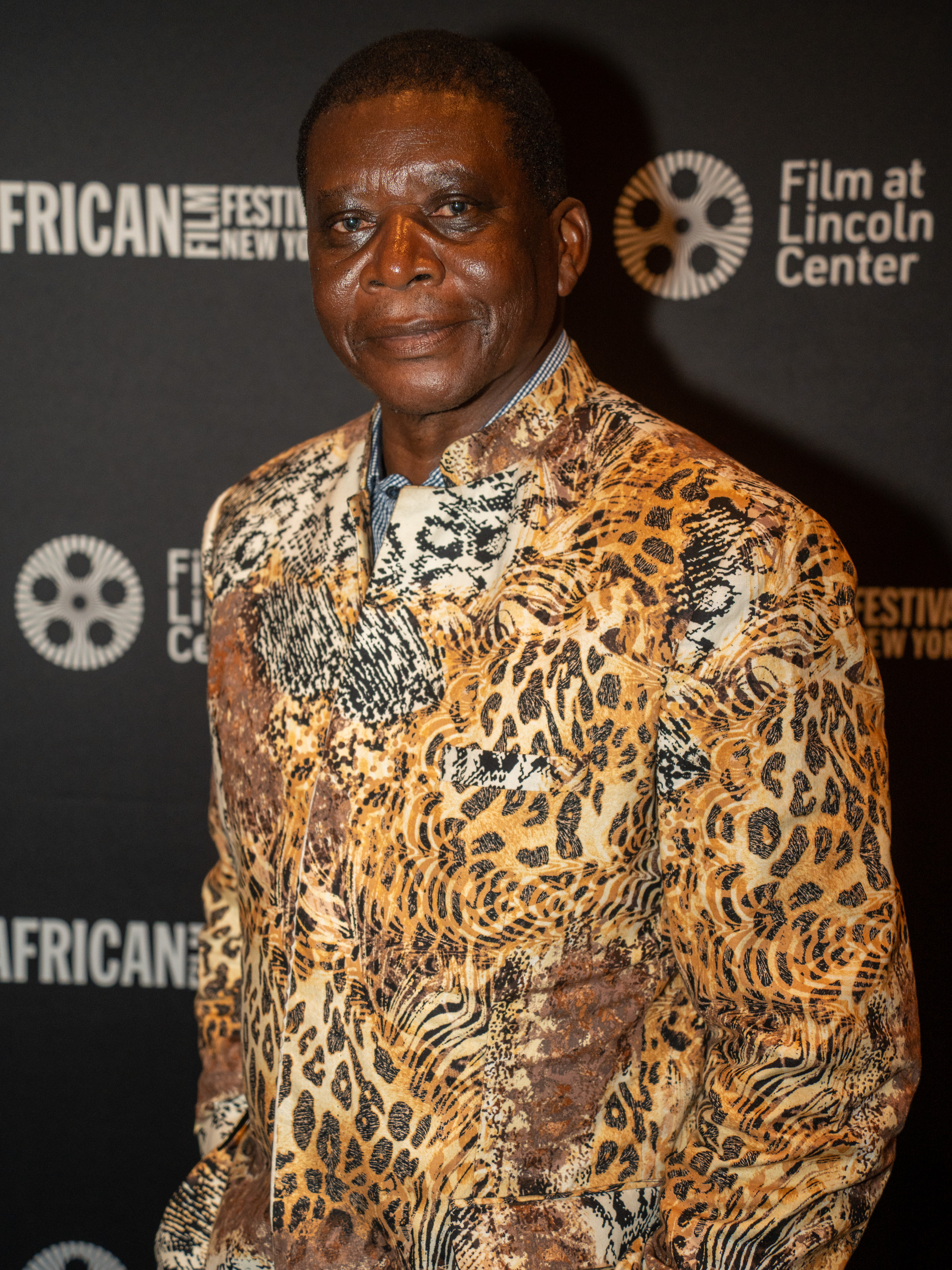
- Kibushi at the 2025 New York African Film Festival
- Born: 1957 (age 68–69); Lubefu, Zaire
- Occupations: Actor, animator
- Years active: 1989–present

Jean-Michel Kibushi Ndjate Wooto (born 1957), is a Congolese stop-motion animator. He is the pioneer of African animation, and widely considered to be the first Congolese animator.

== Personal life ==
He was born on 1957 in Lubefu, Democratic Republic of the Congo. He later grew up in Tshumbe, Zaire.

== Career ==
In 1985, he started to study drama and cinematography at Kinshasa’s National Institute of the Arts which was completed in 1989. During this period, he was introduced to animation by the Belgian production company called "Atelier Graphaoui". In 1988, Wooto created "Studio Malembe Maa", the first local mobile studio for animation in Congo. Then in 1991, he made the first Congolese animated film, Le Crapaud Chez Ses Beaux-Parents (Toad Visits his In-Laws). This animation is a stop-motion film interpretation of a Tetela oral tale. After the success of the animation, in 1992 he then created the documentary animation called "Septembre Noir" (Black September). This animation won the Best Reportage "Animated Political Documentary Film" award at Cameras Youth Festival in Belgium in 1994. In 1992, he won First Prize Short Film at International Festival of Fribourg, Switzerland for the animation Le Crapaud.

In the preceding years, he made many black-n-white animation videos where they later won several awards. The animation Muana Mboka won Public Award of Commons Royannais at the Festival Plein Sud, France, in 2000. In 2005, his animation Prince Loseno won the Jury Prize: Prize of the City of St. George Didonne, Festival Plein Sud, then Special Mention Short Film Jury, at FESPACO as well as Film Award of Hope COE, at FESPACO. In the same year, the animation won SIGNIS Jury Special Mention, at the Festival of Milano.

== Animation works ==
- Le Crapaud Chez Ses Beaux-Parents (1991)
- The White Orange (1992)
- Kinshasa, Black September (1992)
- Muana Mboka (1999)
- L’Orange blanche (1993)
- L’Éléphant qui pète de la neige (1993)
- RICA – Wissembourg, les Chemins croisés de la coopération (2000)
- L’Ane et le Chat (2001)
- Première traversée (2002)
- L’Héritier [Prince Loseno] (2004)
- Caravane pour le Sankuru (2007)
- Ngando (2008)
