= Papa Mfumu'Eto 1er =

Congolese comic creator and painter

Jaspe-Saphir Nkou-Ntoula was born in 1963 at Matadi, Democratic Republic of Congo (DRC) is best known by his pseudonym, Papa Mfumu'Eto 1er ("the first"), which he adopted as a personal brand (along with honorific variations such as "le Grand-prêtre" or "l'Ambassadeur") as a comic book creator in Kinshasa. He studied painting and interior design at the Académie des Beaux-Arts (Kinshasa) before in 1989 leading a small creative team, called Mpangala, in producing a variety of extremely popular, handmade and self-published comic books in Kinshasa. He is best known for the Revue Mfumu'eto which, like most of his work, is written in urban Lingala (Kinshasa's Lingua franca).

His first story in the series, Nguma a meli mwasi na kati ya Kinshasa (“The python that swallowed a woman in Kinshasa”), quickly drew a huge audience in 1990 as it was seen as critical of the DRC's notorious dictator, Mobutu. This success brought Mfumu'Eto instant fame, but his exploding readership was forced to wait as he struggled to produce enough copies for sale.

He has become widely recognized as among the most important comic artists in DRC. His manuscript papers were transferred to the University of Florida in April, 2017 where they are physically preserved and digitized for public open access. In 2015, items from the Revue Mfumu'Eto series were exhibited in Paris with several of the artist's paintings, following the international success of other Kinshasan artists such as Cheri Samba and growing interest in Congolese popular art.
