= Moseka Yogo Ambake =

Congolese-Belgian painter (1956–2019)

- Born: August 29, 1956; Kinshasa, Belgian Congo
- Died: May 6, 2019 (aged 62); Brussels, Belgium
- Occupation: Painter

Moseka Yogo Ambake or Yogo Ambake Moseka (29 August 1956 – 6 May 2019) was a Congolese-born painter who later lived and worked in Brussels, Belgium. Active during the 1980s and 1990s, her work was featured in several international exhibitions.

== Biography ==
Moseka was born in Kinshasa, Belgian Congo (now the Democratic Republic of the Congo), on August 29, 1956. In the traditions of her community (located between Mbandak and Kisangani), "Moseka" is the name given to the first daughter of the family. She attended secondary school but had to leave in her third year due to financial difficulties.

Moseka lived in Mont-Ngafula, Democratic Republic of the Congo, with her husband, European architect and interior designer Thierry Dartois. A self-taught artist, she started by drawing on the walls of their home. She started studying privately with watercolorist and family friend Theo Verwilghen, who discouraged her from pursuing more formal training at the capital's art academy for fear that this would impede her natural talent. She later moved to Brussels with her family.

Moseka had her first exhibition in Kinshasa in 1986 at the private gallery of Louis van Bever. Her work was featured in solo retrospective exhibitions at the Royal Museum for Central Africa in Brussels (1993) and at the Museum of Ethnology in Hamburg (1994). Her work was also included in a group exhibition, Winds of Change, with Hassan Aliyu and Henrietta Atooma Alele at 198 Contemporary Arts and Learning in London (1995–1996).

In an essay, Victor Bol wrote that Moseka's style was "radically distinct from the popular movement" of art in Kinshasa, with her tendency to "capture other things — more things — than the concrete exteriors and appearances of the world." In a 1999 article published in Annales Aequatoria on modern Congolese painters, writer Mabiala Mantuba-Ngoma identified Moseka as the only Congolese woman who had achieved renown for her artwork.

Moseka died on 6 May 2019 in Brussels.
