= Guido Gryseels =

Belgian economist

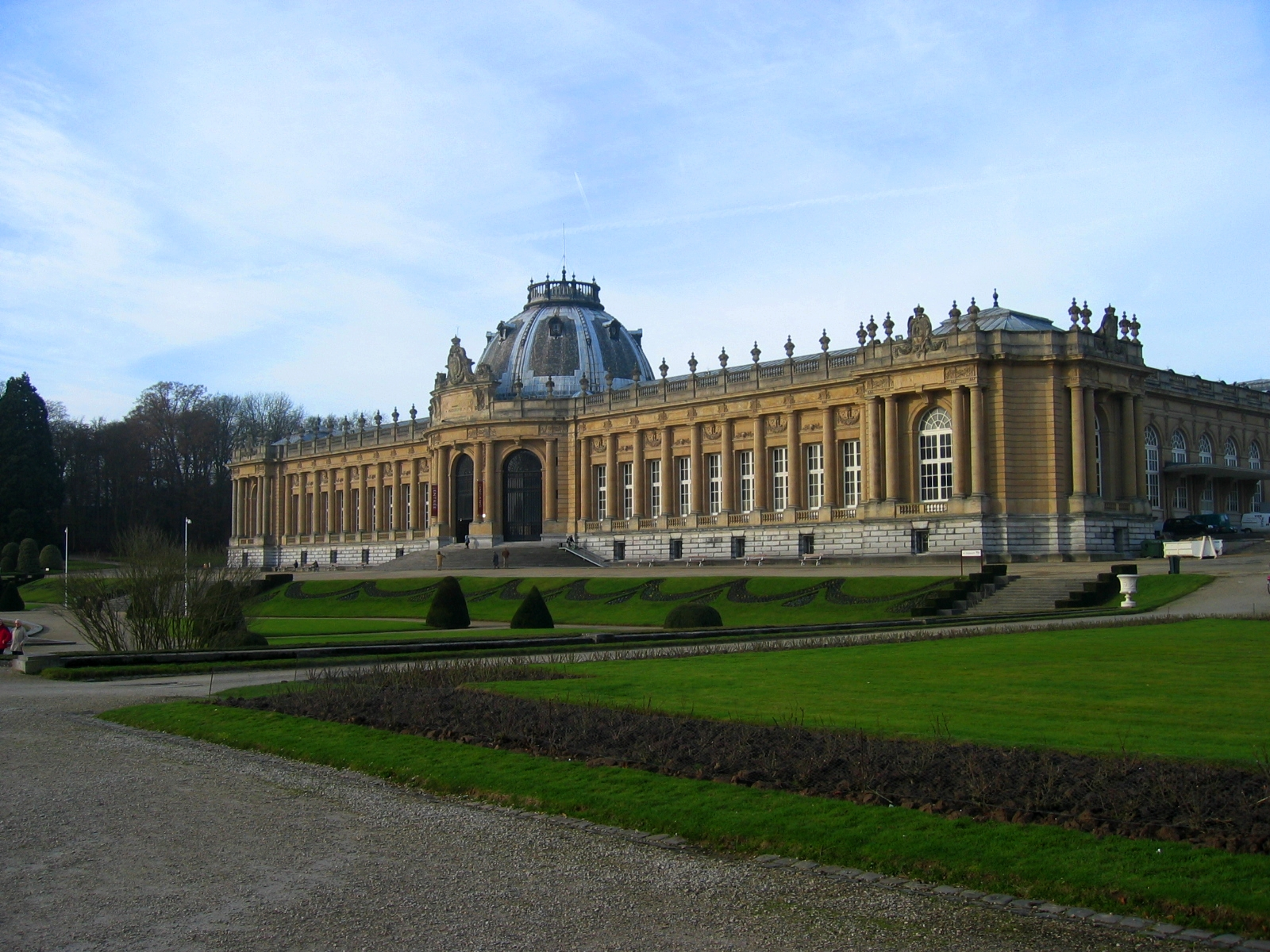
The Royal Museum for Central Africa in Tervuren, Belgium where Gryseels is Director-General

Guido Gryseels is a Belgian academic and agricultural economist who was Director-General of the Royal Museum for Central Africa in Tervuren, Belgium from 2001 to 2022. Until the end of 2009, he was also the Chair of the Board of Trustees of the International Center for Agricultural Research in the Dry Areas (ICARDA), based in Aleppo, Syria. Gryseels, a Belgian national, joined as a member of ICARDA Board of Trustees in 2003 and, at the time, he took over as Board Chair in 2005 and replacing Margaret Catley-Carlson.
