= Ngongo ya Chintu =

Sculptor of Luba art

- Born: Kateba, Katanga Province, Democratic Republic of Congo
- Known for: Sculpture
- Notable work: Prestige Stool: Female Caryatid (19th Century)
- Movement: Luba art

Ngongo ya Chintu, known as the Master of Buli (19th century), was a sculptor of Luba art in what is today the Democratic Republic of the Congo. Little is known of his life, but his work has been collected internationally, and he was said to be well respected in his home village.

== Life and career ==
Ngongo ya Chintu (an honorific title meaning "the great leopard, the father of sculpted things") worked in what was then the Kingdom of Luba, sometime between 1810 and 1870. He carried on a long tradition of Hemba art. Hemba sculpture usually honoured prominent male leaders of the tribe. Ngongo ya Chintu carved both ancestor figures and female figures such as vessel bearers and caryatids, which served as stools for leaders.

== Style ==
According to Alisa LaGamma in Heroic Africans: Legendary Leaders, Iconic Sculptures:

The artist's signature expressionistic style features exaggeration of the face and hands through elongation, which allowed him to reinterpret and ingeniously exploit the formal possibilities of different genres of prestige sculpture: standing figures as caryatid supports for seats...seated mboko (bowl bearers)...and stately male figures.

== Discovery and collection ==
In the 1930s, Belgian art historian Frans Olbrechts noted that some ten figures, assembled for an exhibition, shared similar characteristics, and that two had been collected in the same town, Buli. As nothing was yet known of the sculptor in Western circles, Olbrechts gave him the title "Master of Buli". In the 1970s, Ngongo ya Chintu was identified by the owners of one of his figures as being an artist from the village of Kateba. Marilyn Stokstad notes that villagers in Kateba knew of the master's work, as he was well regarded there.
