= Luba art =

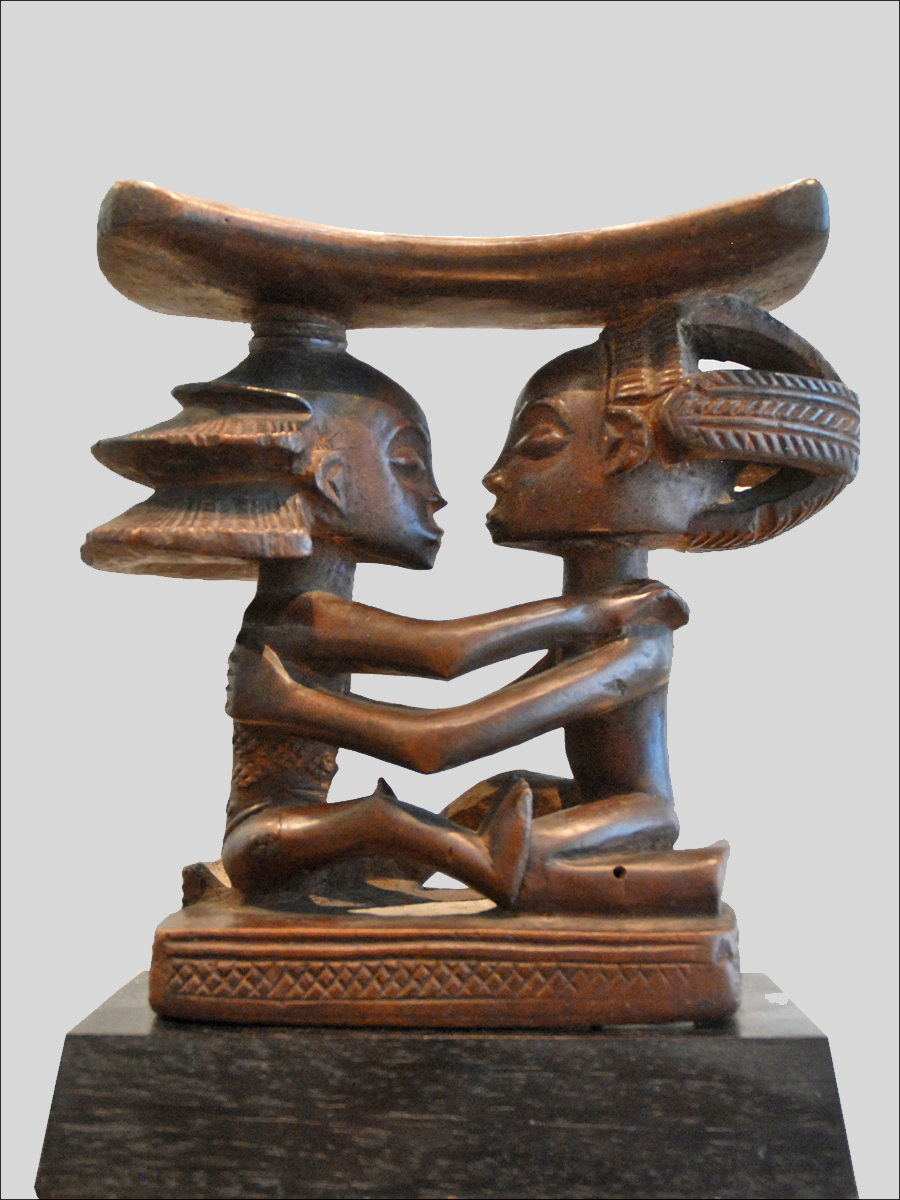
Headrest; 19th century; wood; height: 18.5 cm (7.2 in), width: 19 cm (7.4 in), thickness: 8 cm (3.1 in); Musée du quai Branly (Paris). This headrest presents 19th century Luba hairstyles, as well as the long limbs, bent-back legs, cylindrical torso and dynamic pose typical of the artist who made it.

Luba art refers to the visual and material culture of the Luba people. Most objects were created by people living along the Lualaba River and around the lakes of the Upemba Depression, or among related peoples to the east in what is now the Democratic Republic of the Congo.

The exact date of the founding of the Luba Kingdom is uncertain. According to oral tradition, the cultural hero Kalala Ilunga conquered the lands of adjacent chiefs along the Lualaba River. He and his successors were venerated as living divinities capable of great power. During the eighteenth century the Luba empire expanded eastward and southward until it reached the basins of the Sankuru and Lomami rivers. Luba art consequently varies regionally and has also influenced the art of neighboring peoples including the Hemba and the Boyo. Most of the Luba art in Western collections was originally produced in association with royal or chiefly courts and was meant to validate the power of leaders. Luba art forms are typically "delicately modeled and curvilinear, expressing serenity and introspection".

In December 2010, prestigious auctioning house Sotheby's announced that a Luba sculpture made by the legendary Master of Buli was sold for 7,100,000,00 USD in Paris. The sale made that Luba caryatid stool the second most expensive piece of African art in History.

== Aesthetics ==
According to Luba spokespersons, the outward form and iconography of Luba objects are directly connected to their effectiveness. For Luba, how an object looks dictates how well it works. To be considered effective, an object must work to protect, promote, and heal individuals and communities.

== Emphasis on women ==
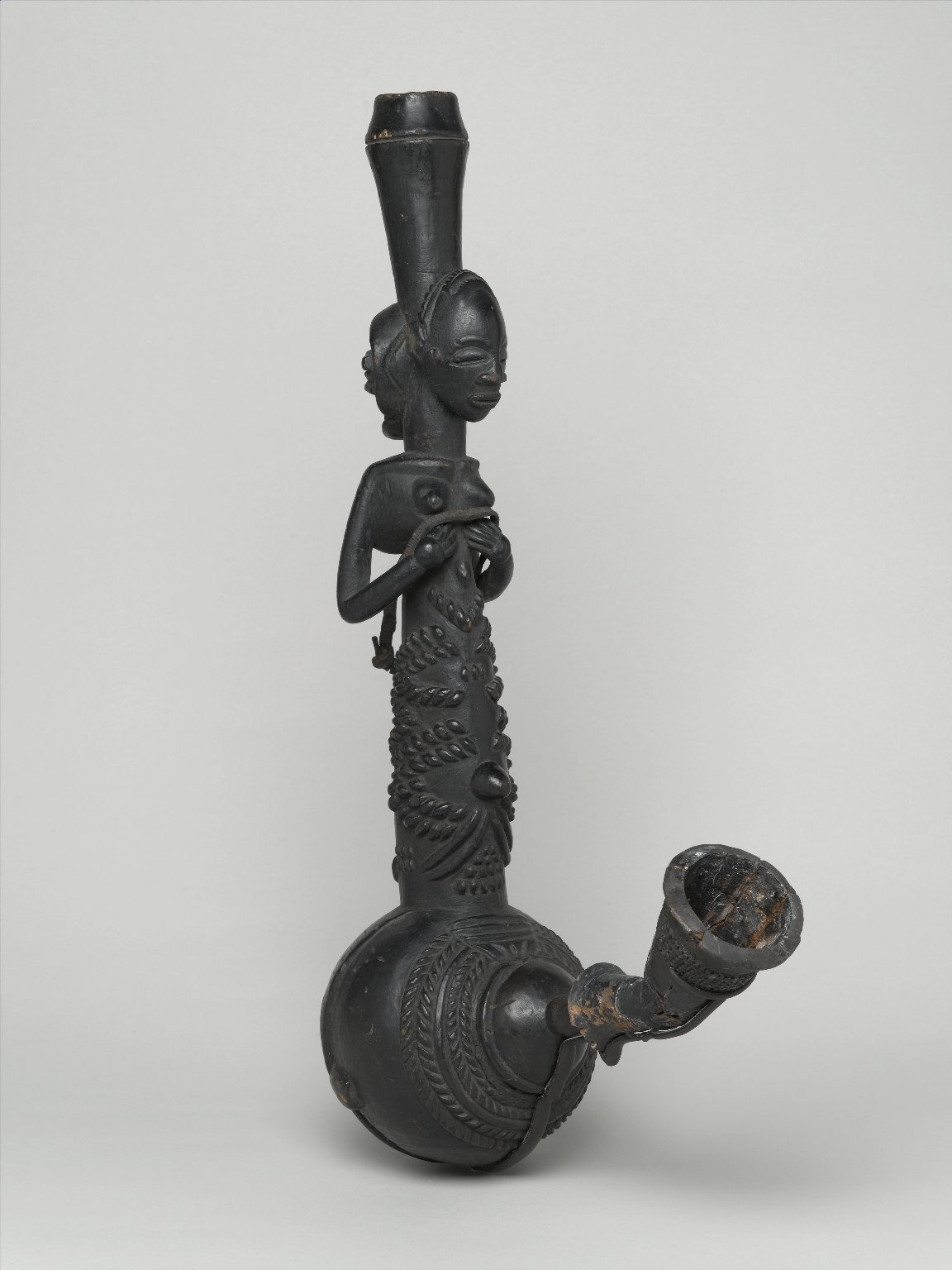
Luba water pipe, from the collection of the Brooklyn Museum

Almost all Luba art includes the female form either surmounting or supporting objects such as headrests, staffs, spears, axes or bowls. The female figure holding her breasts is the most common motif in Luba art. The gesture has multiple levels of meaning, symbolizing respect, nurturing, and the role of women as mothers. The representation is also significant since the Luba trace descent through the female line. This gesture also references the fact that in Luba culture, only women are deemed strong enough to guard the profound secrets of royalty, and it is within their breasts that they protect the royal prohibitions upon which sacred kingship depends. These women also often bear signs of Luba identity such as pervasive marks of beauty in the form of scarification.

Luba explain that only women, who have the potential to become pregnant and produce new life, are strong enough to hold powerful spirits and the secret knowledge associated with them.

Because of the emphasis on women, Luba objects were usually the property of men of noble status. The artists who made them were also men, trained in blacksmithing and woodcarving.

== Memory mapping ==
The concept of memory is central to an understanding of Luba art. Luba map memory through the iconography of stools, staffs, and other visual devices. Since precolonial times, the recounting of history has been a specific and highly valued form of intellectual activity among Luba. Visual representations (Luba art) has been a primary vehicle for the making of Luba histories of kingship and political relations.

== Lukasa ==
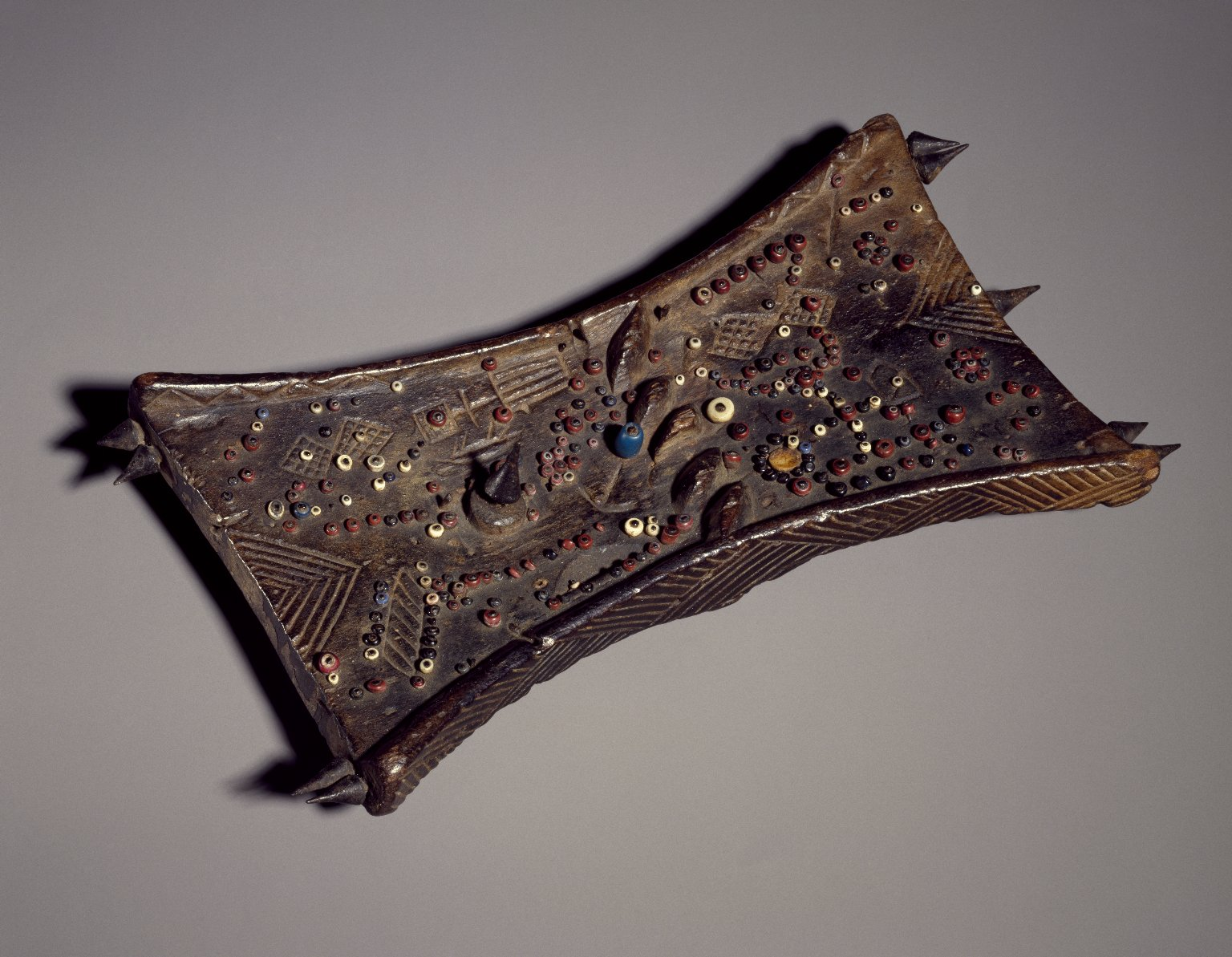
Lukasa memory board, from the collection of the Brooklyn Museum

Central to Luba artistry is the lukasa, a device that aids memory and the making of histories. Stools, staffs, figures, and complex choreographies complement the lukasa as Luba culture is remembered, produced, and transformed.

Lukasa memory boards are hourglass-shaped wooden tablets that are covered with multicolored beads, shells and bits of metal, or are incised or embossed with carved symbols. The colors and configurations of beads or ideograms serve to stimulate the recollection of important people, places, things, relationships and events as court historians narrate the origins of Luba authority. A lukasa serves as an archive for the topographical and chronological mapping of political histories and other data sets.

== Staffs ==
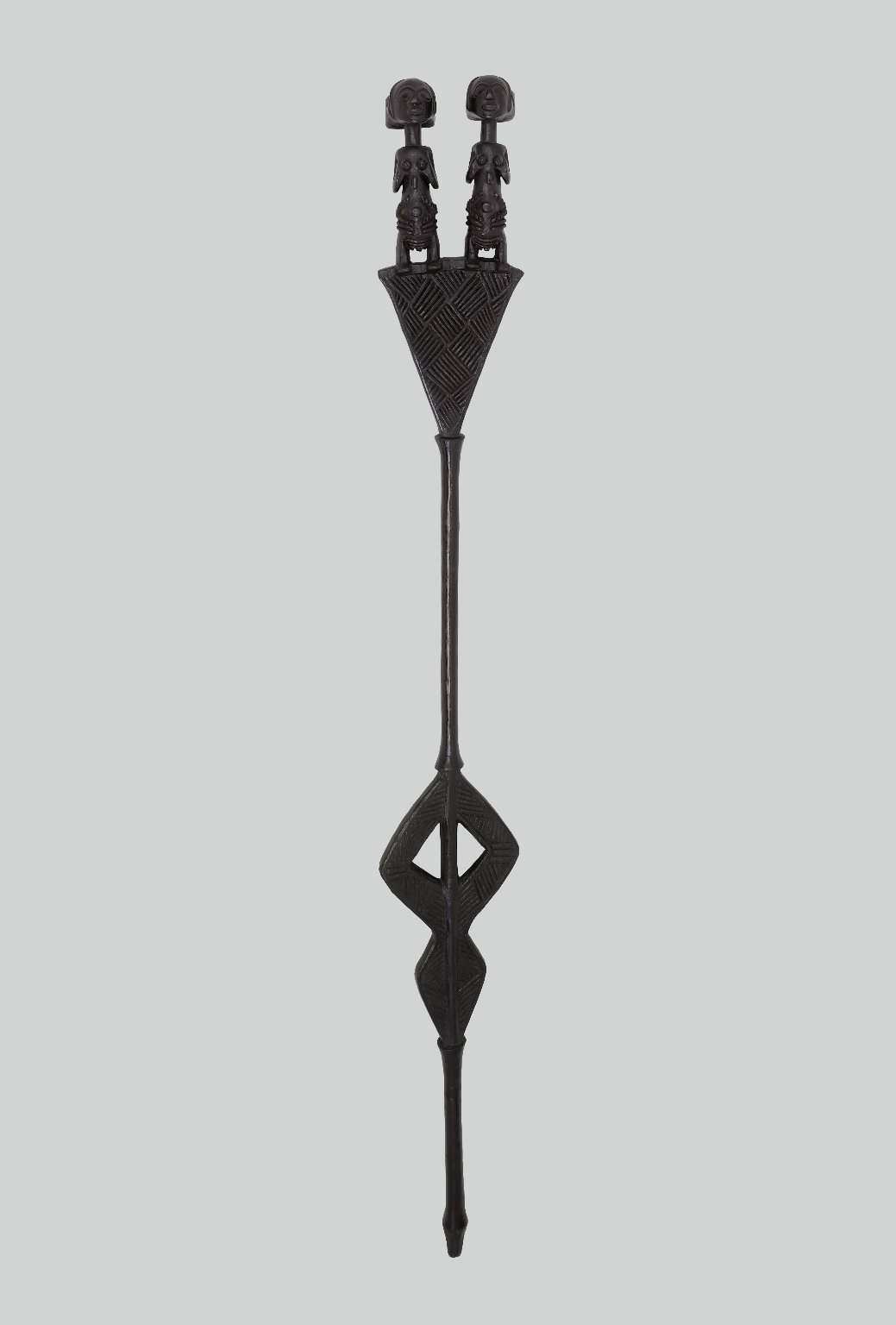
Ceremonial staff (Kibango), from the collection of the Brooklyn Museum

Staffs of office are among the most plentiful of Luba royal insignia. They are also the most diverse in iconography because their ownership was considerably more democratic than that of stools: caryatid stools were restricted to highest-ranking political offices, whereas staffs could belong to diviners, Mbudye members, title-holders and territorial chiefs. No two Luba staffs are alike because each encodes the histories, genealogies and migrations of a particular family, lineage or chiefdom. The details of a particular staff act as mnemonic cues, which assist narrators in "politically motivated recollection of the past."

== Caryatid stools ==
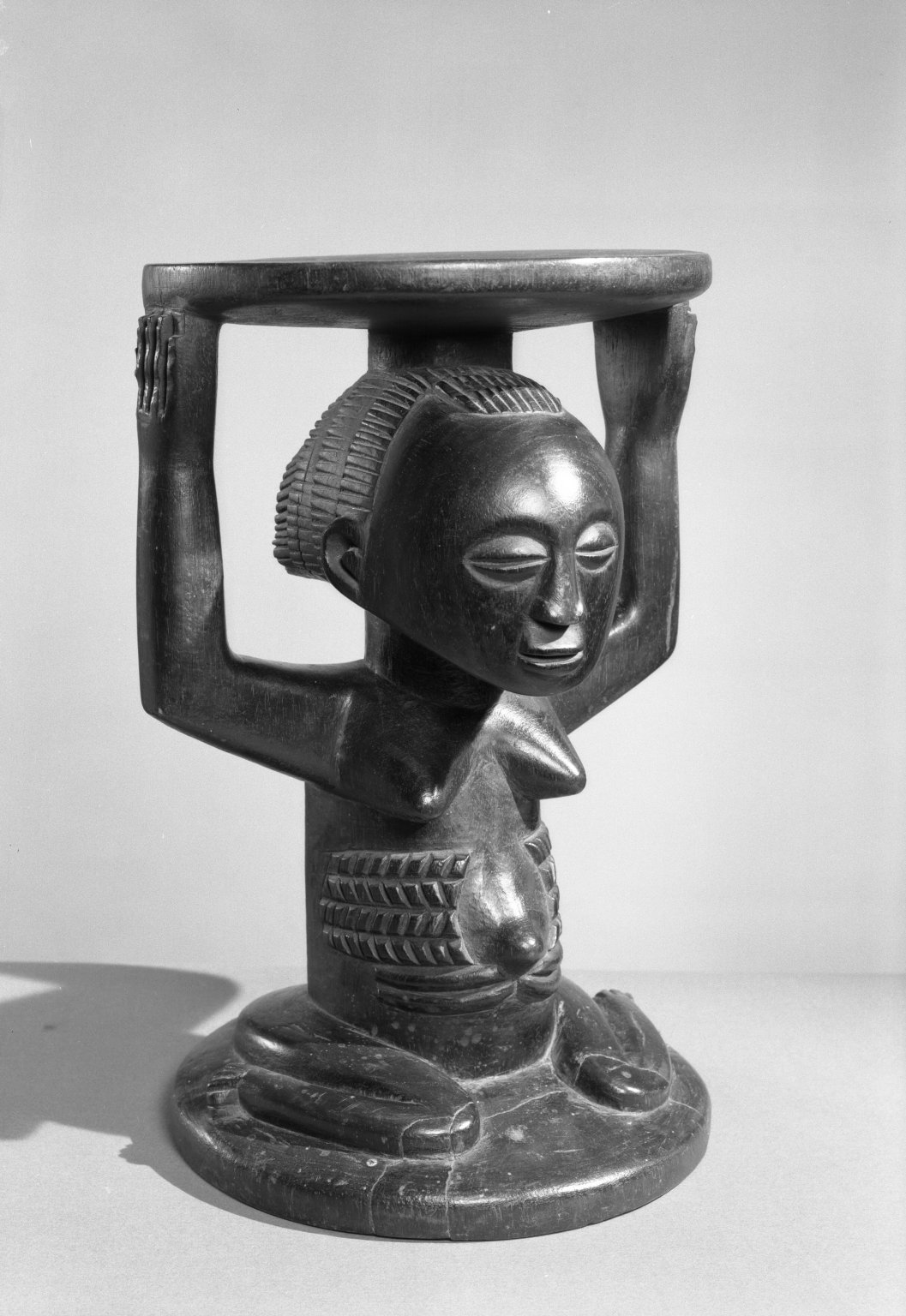
Luba caryatid stool, from the collection of the Brooklyn Museum

While many objects of Luba art appear to be functional, their utilitarian purposes have been replaced or augmented by symbolic purposes. Sculpted caryatid stools serve symbolically as seats of power and sites of memory for deceased kings and chiefs rather than serve as places to sit. Therefore, they are metaphorical, not literal, seats of kingship. The design of Luba seats of leadership may either be abstract or figurative. Those incorporating female caryatids give expression to the Luba conception of the female body as a spiritual receptacle that supports divine kingship. The aesthetic refinement of the female body through elaborate skin ornamentation serves as a metaphor for the civilization and refinement that Luba rulers disseminate within society.

Like lukasas, Luba stools and staffs are "mnemonic mapping devices." They reflect and simulate "place memory" because they refer to sacred sites and prompt the narration of political histories through their forms. Luba caryatid stools embodied important rulers of the past. When a Luba king died, his royal residence (or kitenta) became the site where his spirit was incarnated by a female medium called Mwadi. This woman was possessed by the spirit of the king and inherited his insignia, dignitaries and wives. The succeeding king established a new residence, and throughout his reign he offered tribute to the mwadi of his predecessor. A caryatid stool is therefore a concrete manifestation of this metaphysical "seat."

One such Luba creator of caryatid stools is the 19th-century sculptor Ngongo ya Chintu.

== Bow stands ==
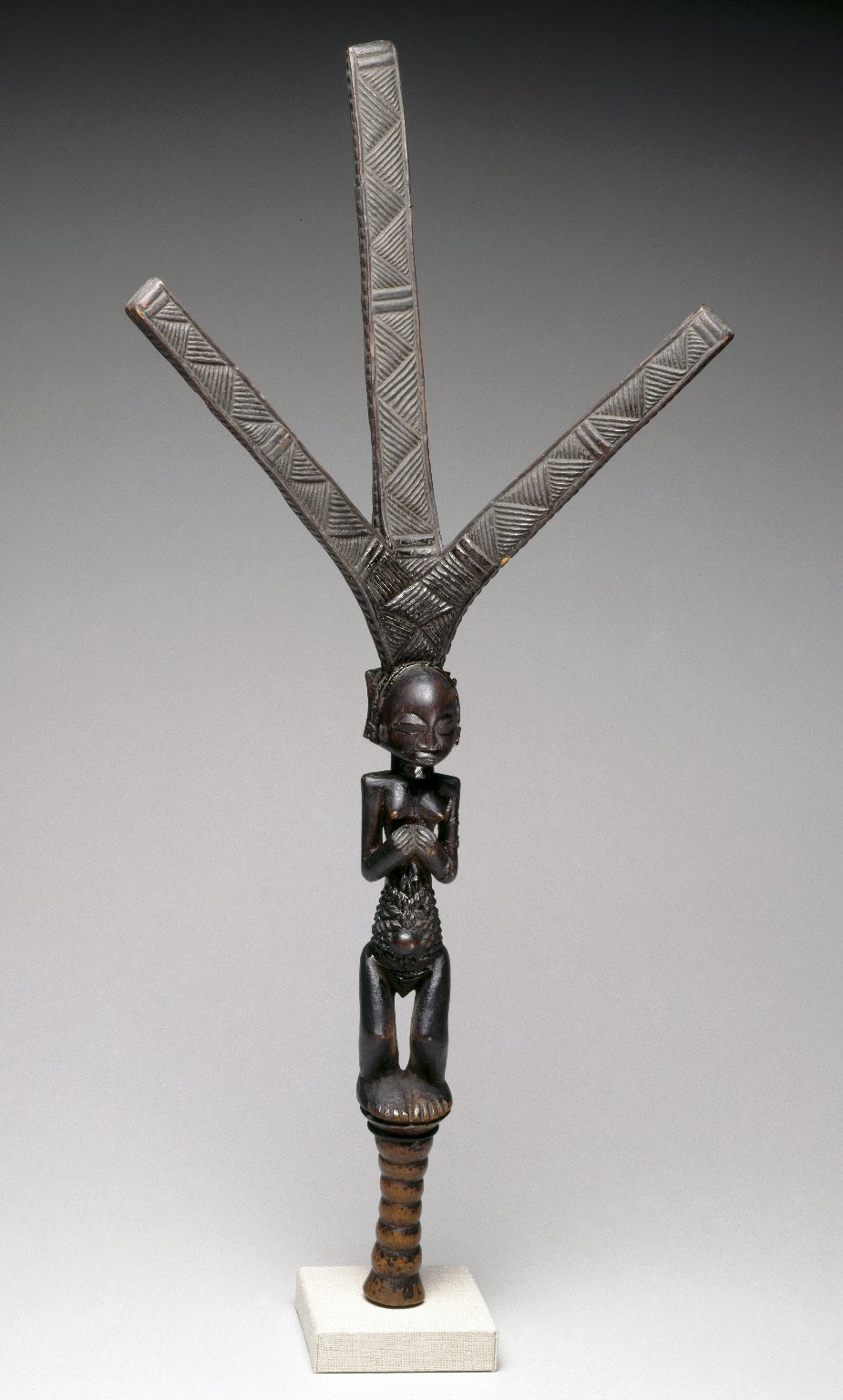
Bow stand, from the collection of the Brooklyn Museum

Wooden or iron bow stands may have begun as practical objects, but they are also potent reminders of Mbidi Kiluwe, a culture hero who was a masterful hunter and blacksmith. Like other Luba regalia, bow stands were deployed in secret rituals and rarely publicly displayed. They were guarded in a special building by female dignitaries who provided prayers and sacrifices to them. Otherwise they were kept beside the bed of the ruler to inform his dreams and protect him from mystical and human adversaries. Iron bow stands make anthropomorphic references through hourglass-shaped torsos reminiscent of lukasa memory boards. Wooden bow stands are often adorned with full female figures referring to founders of royal lineages or Bevidye. Finally the metal shaft of bow stands convey the king's strength, and when planted in the ground, they testify to his origins and power.
