= African art in Western collections =

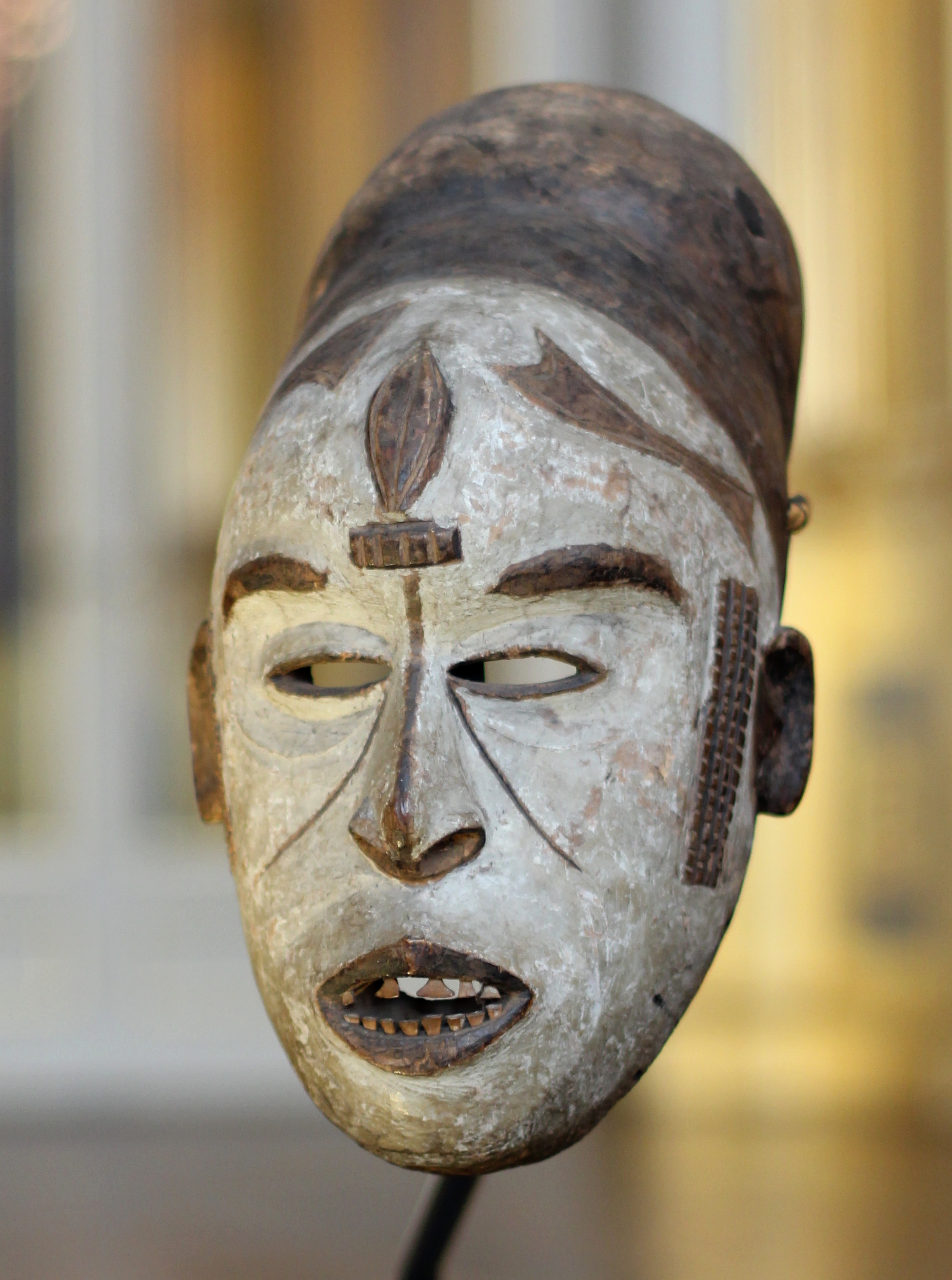
An Ibo mask at the Royal Museum for Central Africa, Belgium.

Some African objects had been collected by Europeans for centuries, and there had been industries producing some types, especially carvings in ivory, for European markets in some coastal regions. Between 1890 and 1918 the volume of objects greatly increased as Western colonial expansion in Africa led to the removal of many pieces of sub-Saharan African art that were subsequently brought to Europe and displayed. These objects entered the collections of natural history museums, art museums (both encyclopedic and specialist) and private collections in Europe and the United States. About 90% of Africa's cultural heritage is believed to be located in Europe, according to French art historians.

Initially mostly seen as illustrating the ethnology of different African cultures, appreciation of pieces as artworks grew during the 20th century. Only towards the end of the century was "modern" African art in fine art genres accepted as significant.

== 19th century ==
Before the Berlin Conference of 1885, traders and explorers to Africa purchased or stole art as souvenirs and curios, spreading beyond the coast; ivory objects made along African coasts had been collected for centuries, and many were made by Africans for purchase by Europeans, mainly in areas reached by the Portuguese, such as the Afro-Portuguese ivories. The period dominated by curio collecting, in which objects served as souvenirs, was followed by a period of trophy collecting in which large collections of artifacts (mostly weapons), and animal skins, horns, and tusks from hunting expeditions were formed.

Starting in the 1870s, thousands of African sculptures arrived in Europe in the aftermath of colonial conquest, exploratory expeditions and Christian missionary activity. Many reached museums such as the Musée d'Ethnographie du Trocadéro, founded in 1878 in Paris, and its counterparts in other European cities. At the time, these objects were treated as artifacts of colonized cultures rather than as artworks and were very cheap, often sold in flea markets and pawnshops.

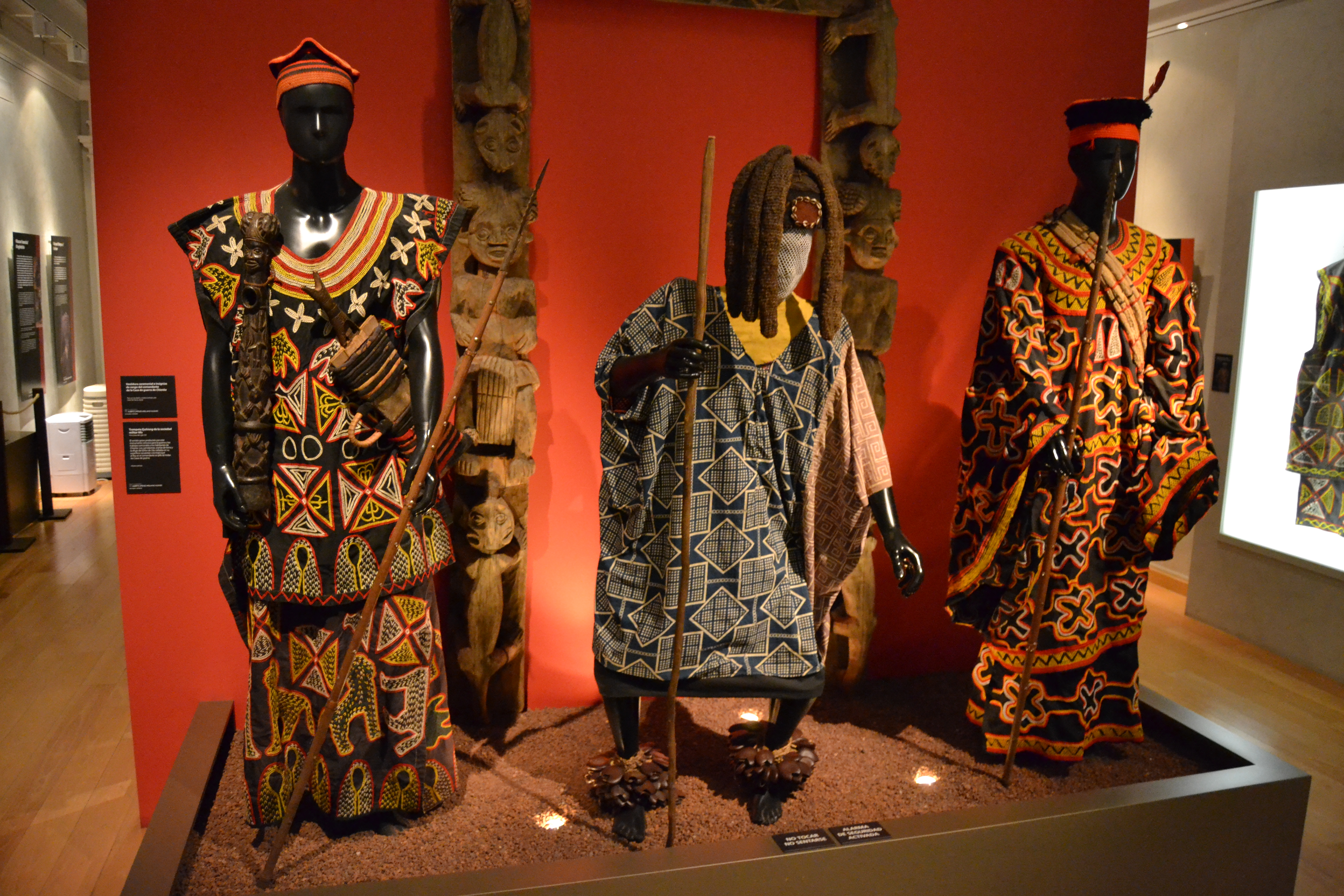
Oku costumes, Museo de Arte Africano, Valladolid

For the discussion about the restitution of African art following the announcement by French president Emmanuel Macron in 2017, see the report on the restitution of African cultural heritage.

== European collections ==
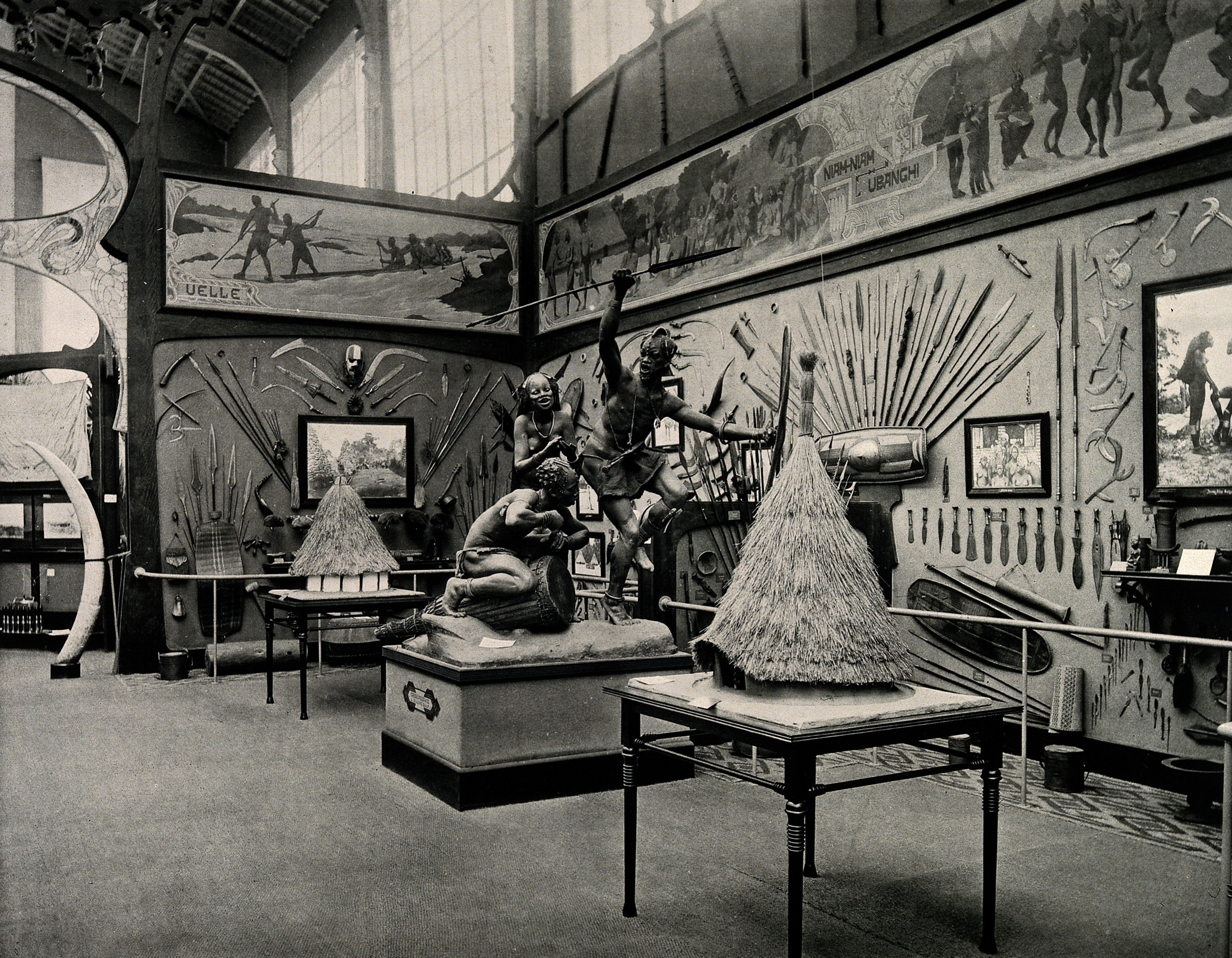
Art on display at the Royal Museum of Central Africa.

The different histories of museums in Europe and the United States affected the collecting and display of African art in both places. European museums typically were founded as state institutions and thus their collections and displays were shaped by national interests. African art and artifacts were mostly displayed in an ethnological context. The appreciation of African objects purely as fine art in Europe was largely limited to private galleries in the early twentieth century. In Paris, dealers such Paul Guillaume, Charles Ratton and Louis Carré played a role in the formation of major private collections of African art. The latter half of the twentieth century saw the opening of the first European art museums devoted to collecting and displaying African art, including the Musee Barbier-Mueller in Geneva (1977), the Musee Dapper in Paris (1986). Also, many general art museums by then had collections of non-Western art, such as the Metropolitan Museum of Art in New York City.

=== Royal Museum for Central Africa in Belgium ===
In 1897, King Leopold II took advantage of the Brussels International Exhibition in Tervuren to promote his holdings of the Congo Free State. The 1897 International Exhibition piqued scientific interest in the natural resources, people and animals of Central Africa, thus King Leopold II decided to build on his promotion of Congo. The Royal Museum of Central Africa was established in 1898 as a permanent museum and scientific institution, responsible for mounting exhibitions for the Belgian public and encouraging the study of Central Africa.

=== British Museum ===
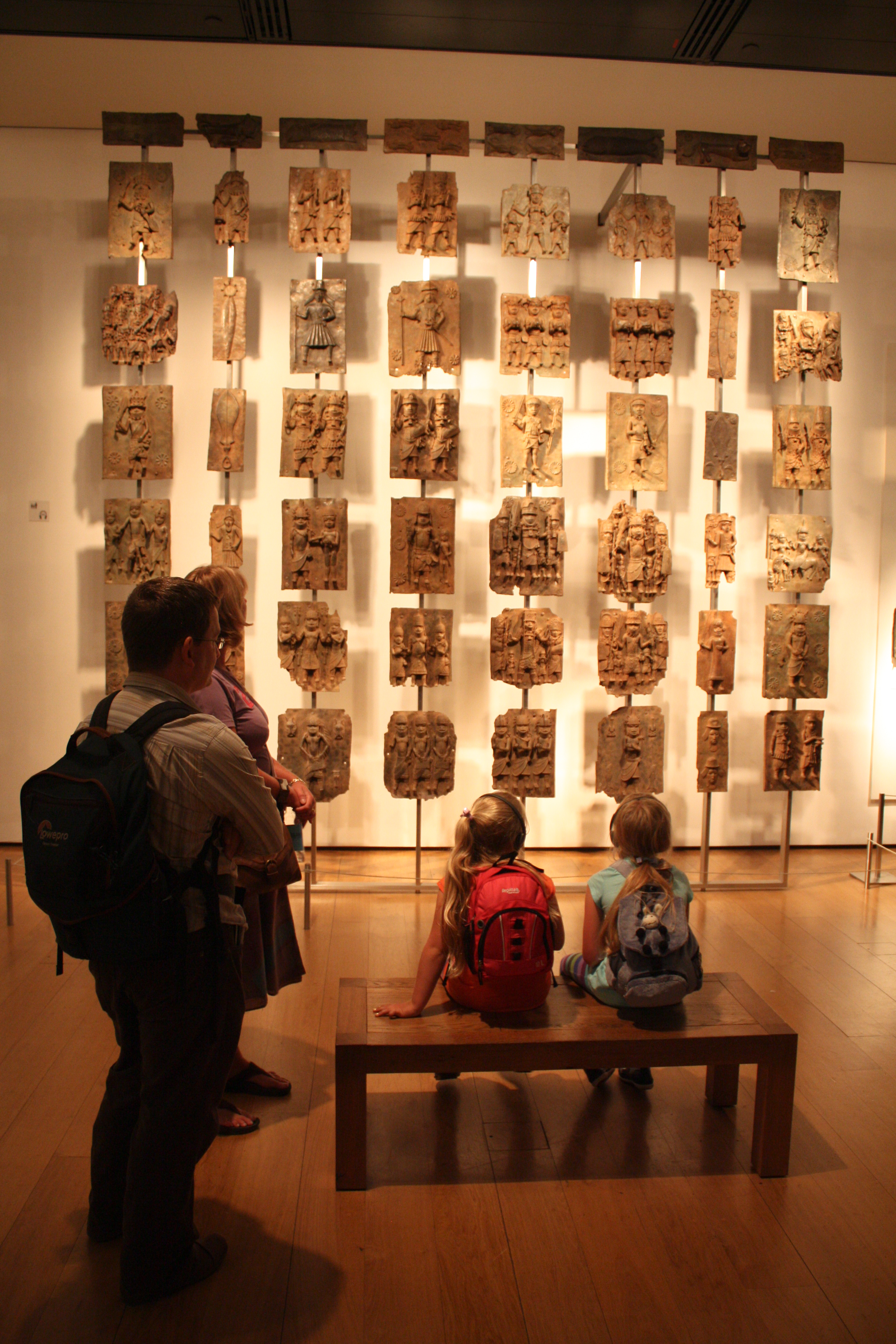
Benin Bronzes in the British Museum

The Sainsbury African Galleries in the British Museum in London display 600 objects from the largest permanent collection of African arts and culture in the world. The three permanent galleries provide a substantial exhibition space for the museum's African collection, comprising over 200,000 objects. This curatorial scope encompasses both archaeological and contemporary objects, including both unique masterpieces of artistry and objects of everyday life. A great addition was material amassed by Sir Henry Wellcome, which was donated by the Wellcome Historical Medical Museum in 1954.

Highlights of the African collection include the Benin and Igbo-Ukwu bronze sculptures, the beautiful Bronze Head of Queen Idia, a magnificent brass head of a Yoruba ruler from Ife, the Apapa Hoard from Lagos, southern Nigeria, a dozen exquisite Afro-Portuguese ivories, Asante goldwork from Ghana, including the Bowdich collection, the rare Akan Drum from the same region in West Africa, a series of soapstone figures from the Kissi people in Sierra Leone and Liberia, the Torday collection of Central African sculpture, textiles and weaponry, important material from Ethiopia following the British Expedition to Abyssinia, the unique Luzira Head from Uganda, excavated objects from Great Zimbabwe and satellite towns such as Mutare including a large hoard of Iron Age soapstone figures, a rare divining bowl from the Venda peoples and cave paintings and petroglyphs from South Africa.

The Benin Bronzes were seized by a British force in the Benin Expedition of 1897 and given to the British Foreign Office. As Paula Girshick Ben-Amos, a professor of anthropology and African Studies at Indiana University, states in "The Art of Benin", “art of the Benin Kingdom came to public and scholarly attention in the West in 1897, when members of a British Punitive Expedition brought out thousands of objects as war booty.”

Around 200 of the bronzes were passed on to the British Museum, while the remainder were divided among a variety of collections, with the majority being purchased by Felix von Luschan on behalf of the Königliches Museum für Völkerkunde in Berlin (the present-day Ethnological Museum). In 1936, Oba Akenzua II began the movement to return the corpus of objects now known in modern discourse as the 'Benin Bronzes'.

=== Musée d'Ethnographie du Trocadéro ===
The Musée d'Ethnographie du Trocadéro was the first anthropological museum in Paris, founded in 1878. It closed in 1935 when the building that housed it, the Trocadéro Palace, was demolished; its descendant is the Musée de l'Homme, housed in the Palais de Chaillot on the same site, and its French collections formed the nucleus of the Musée National des Arts et Traditions Populaires, also in the Palais de Chaillot. Numerous Fauvist and Cubist artists discovered African art at the Trocadéro Museum. Picasso said that this art taught him "what painting was all about", seeing it in the museum's African masks, which had been created "as a kind of mediation between [humanity] and the unknown hostile forces that [surround us]", and to have been influenced by the masks in the forms of the figures in Les Demoiselles d'Avignon, which eventually led to Cubism. Most of the African collection has since been transferred to the Musee du Quai Branly, also in Paris.

=== The Glendonwyn Collection ===
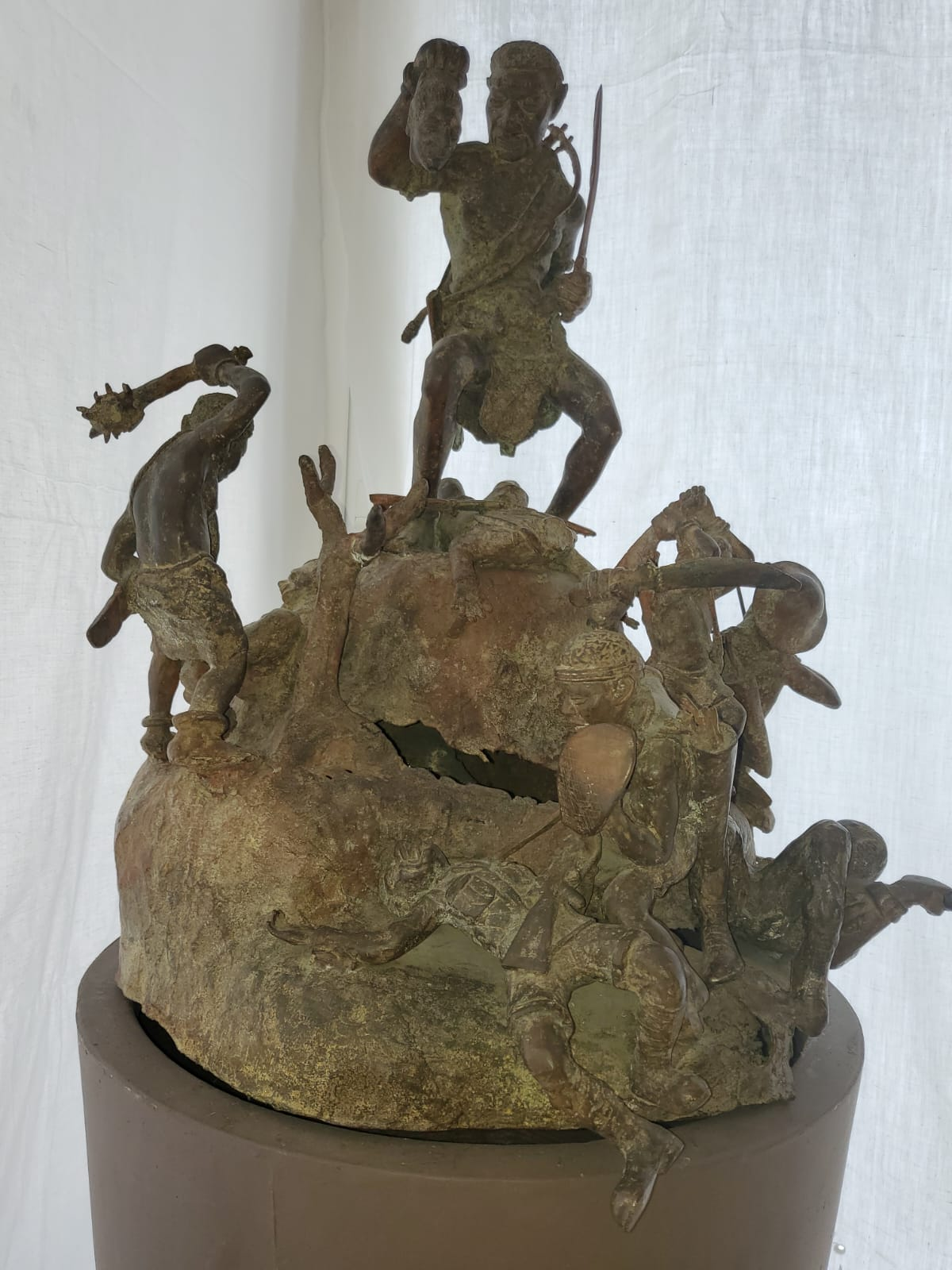
The Benin Massacre

The Glendonwyn Collection comprises over 3,000 objects. Initiated in the XX century by Manuel González Scott-Glendonwyn, its scope encompasses from archaeological to XIX century objects. Most of the pieces were added to the collection in the 1960’s. A trilogy of three books titled “Art of Black Africa: The Glendonwyn Collection” was published in the 1990’s. Features of the Glendonwyn Collection include multiple Benin and Igbo-Ukwu bronze sculptures, The Benin Massacre bronze sculpture (a magnificent representation of the massacre of the Phillips expedition), Oba the Warrior (a representation of an Oba, which appears in the front page of the first book of the collection), multiple 6th century BC Nok terracottas, Benin Bronzes, several dozen perfectly maintained Afro-Portuguese ivories, and a good representation of 11 of the 17 African historical cultural civilizations including Yoruba/Ife, Ashanti, Senufo, and Dogon. The collection also includes some contemporary art from artists such as Twins Seven Seven or late 80’s additions.

In the year 1999 the Spanish Government initiated negotiations to convince The Glendonwyn Collection owners to establish a museum in Madrid. Negotiations failed in 2002 with the death of the head of the family, although in the 1999-2002 period, several expositions were presented in Spain’s public museums. The Glendonwyn Collection is currently divided between Madrid, Tenerife and Dubai.

=== Museum of African Art (Belgrade) ===
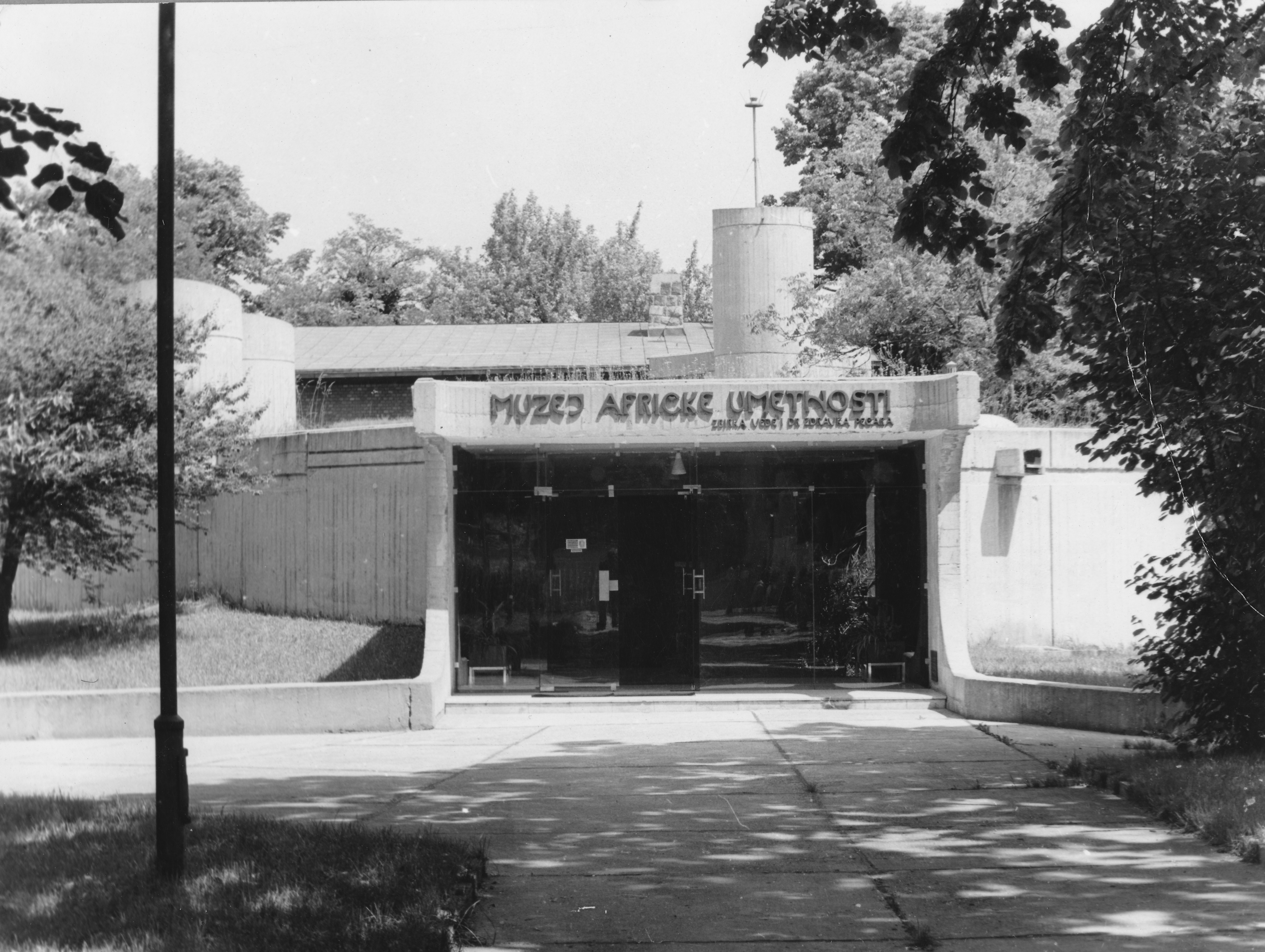
The Museum of African Art in Belgrade at the time of its opening

The Museum of African Art in Belgrade is the only one of this kind in the Balkan region. It was opened in 1977 because of Yugoslavia's relations with many African countries thanks to its central role in the Non-Aligned Movement. The museum was opened out of the desire to acquaint the people of Yugoslavia with the art and culture of Africa since there was a deeply rooted notion about Yugoslavia sharing a friendship with African countries thanks to their similar struggles. It was created thanks to Zdravko Pečar and Veda Zagorac who donated to the city of Belgrade their private collection of African art which they collected over several decades which they spent on the continent - Pečar was a foreign correspondent and an ambassador to several African countries. Over the years, the collection was expanded thanks to the museum buying pieces, receiving them as gifts from Yugoslavs who lived in Africa and as diplomatic gifts which were given the museum by the ambassadors of African countries. As a result, the museum today has a significant collection of art and ethnographic items from the Bambara, Dogon, Mossi, Kisi, Dan, Senufo, Ashanti and other people.

=== National Museum of World Cultures in the Netherlands ===
Jointly administered by the Nationaal Museum van Wereldculturen, public ethnographic museums in the Netherlands hold important collections of African heritage. In January 2021, the Dutch government approved a central mechanism for the repatriation of colonial heritage, and a research group is working on practical guidance for colonial collections in Dutch museums.

== African art in ethnological collections ==
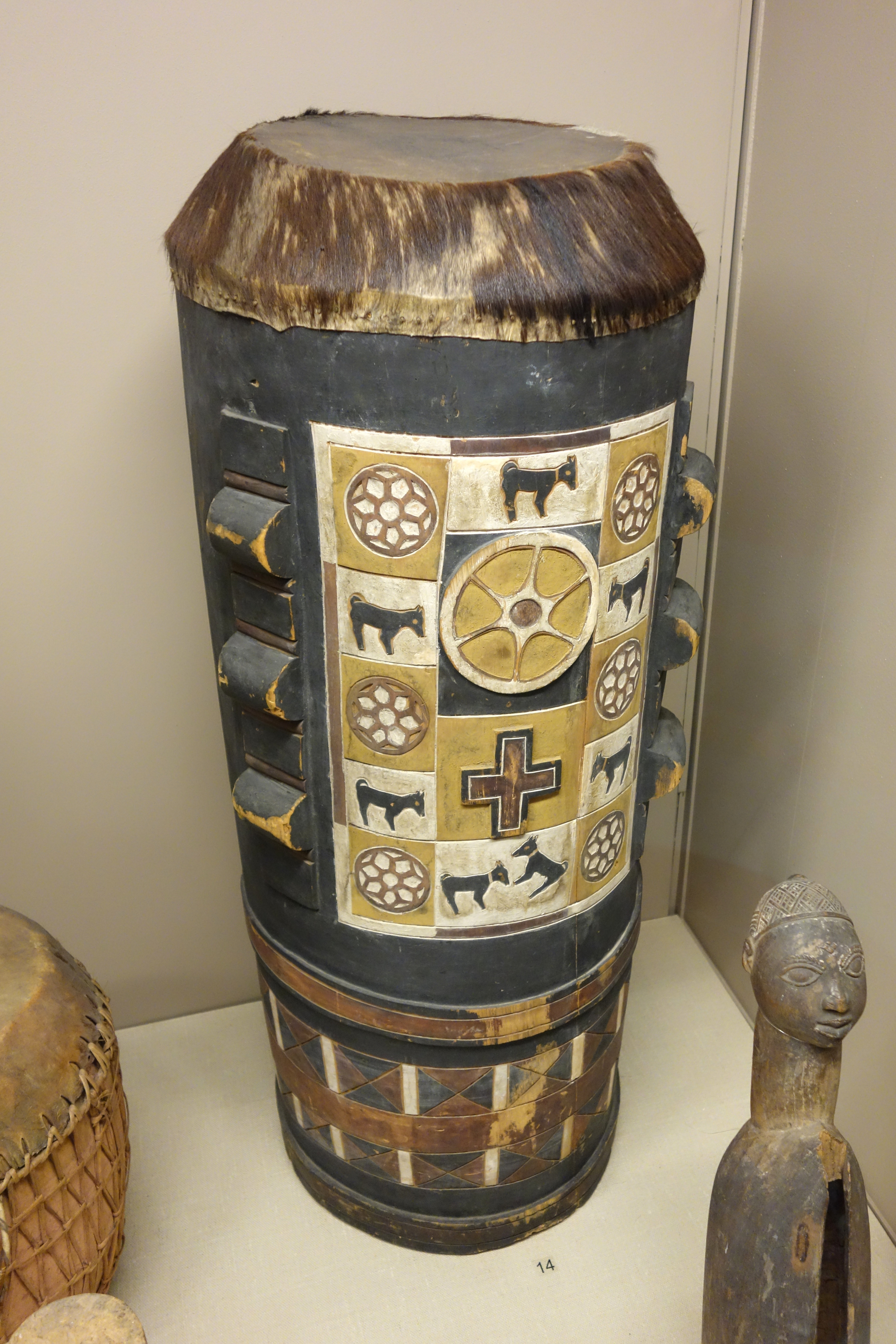
A Kongo drum in the ethnographic collection of the Royal Museum for Central Africa.

Initially, all African art objects were viewed as ethnological specimens. Notably, during the period of 1890 through 1913, all large museums redefined their public image in terms of an educational prerogative. In response to the debate around the use of the terms curio and curiosity, the League of the Empire in 1904 recommended the "orderly arrangement and the transformation of mere curios into objects of scientific interest by appropriate classification." Likewise, as a means of validating the expansion of ethnological collections, the rhetoric often employed was one of the necessity of conservation and preservation in the face of the inevitable extinction of the producers of the materials culture in their custody (121).

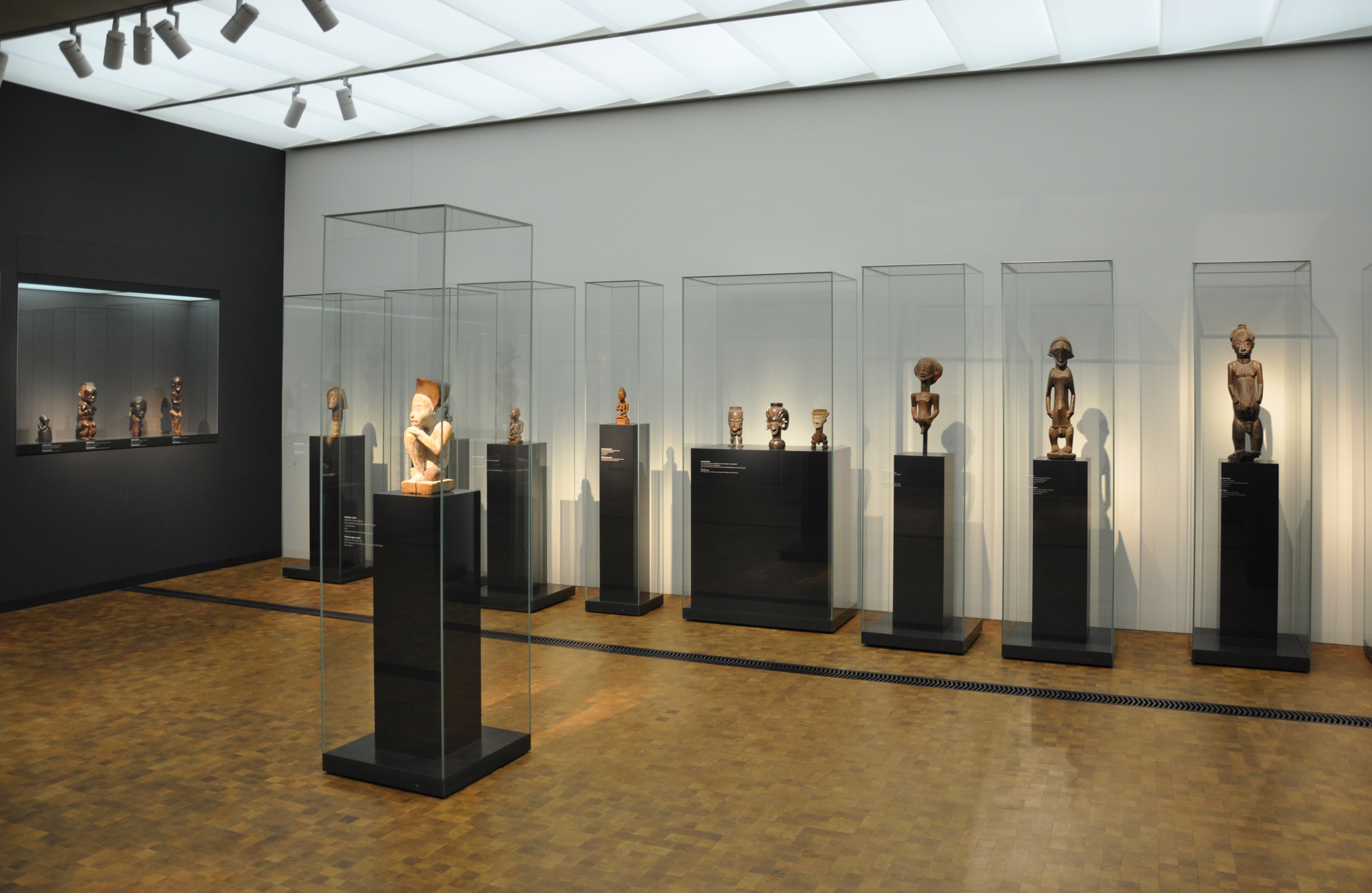
Museum Rietberg, Zurich

Stewart Culin, curator at the Brooklyn Museum, was the first American curator to display ethnological collections as art objects, not as ethnological specimens, which he did in 1923. Culin distinguished his installation from those of contemporaneous ethnological collections at institutions such as the American Museum of Natural History and the Smithsonian Museum of Natural History in saying that "the objects of Negro art which are displayed publicly form part of museum collections of African ethnology and receive no special attention at the hands of ethnologists... In the majority of these collections their artistic significance is obscured by the wealth of material, and lost, not infrequently, in the efforts made for its elucidation." Art/Artifact, an exhibition organized by Susan Vogel in 1988, presented 160 objects of art and ethnology selected from the Buffalo Museum of Science, the Hampton University Museum (Virginia), and the American Museum of Natural History (New York City). All three are anthropology museums founded in the 1860s with distinguished African collections. The exhibition examined the shifting definitions of art and artifact, and dealt with the question of how we look at objects from traditional African cultures whose classification systems differ from contemporary Western culture.

== African art and Western Modernism ==
During the early 1900s, the aesthetics of traditional African sculpture became a powerful influence among European artists who formed an avant-garde in the development of modern art, known as the "Primitivism" movement. In France, Henri Matisse, Pablo Picasso, and their School of Paris friends blended the highly stylized treatment of the human figure in African sculptures with painting styles derived from the post-Impressionist works of Cézanne and Gauguin. The resulting pictorial flatness, vivid color palette, and fragmented Cubist shapes helped to define early modernism. While these artists knew nothing of the original meaning and function of the West and Central African sculptures they encountered, they claimed to instantly recognize the spiritual aspect of the composition and to adapt these qualities to their own efforts to move beyond the naturalism that had defined Western art since the Renaissance.

German Expressionist painters such as Ernst Ludwig Kirchner of Die Brücke (The Bridge) group, based in Dresden and Berlin, conflated African aesthetics with the emotional intensity of dissonant color tones and figural distortion, to depict the anxieties of modern life, while Paul Klee of the Blaue Reiter (Blue Rider) in Munich developed transcendent symbolic imagery. The Expressionists' interest in non-Western art intensified after a 1910 Gauguin exhibition in Dresden, while modernist movements in Italy, England, and the United States initially engaged with African art through contacts with School of Paris artists. These avant-garde artists, their dealers, and leading critics of the era were among the first Europeans to collect African sculptures for their aesthetic value.

== American collections ==
The 1913 Armory Show marked a seminal moment for America’s avant-garde. An exposition of about 1,300 works, it introduced the New York art audience to movements like Cubism, Fauvism and Futurism, as well as the work of European artists including Pablo Picasso, Henri Matisse and Marcel Duchamp. The Armory Show and its promotion of Modernism also helped create a taste and a market for African art in New York.

Notably, in 1914 two New York galleries introduced African sculpture to their audiences: Robert J. Coady’s newly opened Washington Square Gallery and Alfred Stieglitz's well-established Little Galleries of the Photo-Secession. Stieglitz’s held an exhibition in 1914 dedicated entirely to African artifacts as works of art.

New York City progressively positioned itself as a central marketplace for African art. During the years 1915-19, American dealers began promoting African objects as art to a growing group of collectors. Among the dealers, Mexican artist Marius de Zayas (1880–1961) was largely responsible for helping some adventurous modern-art collectors, including Walter and Louise Arensberg, John Quinn, and Agnes and Eugene Meyer, to build their African art collections. During the early 1920s, several American institutions began opening their doors to African art.

=== Brooklyn Museum ===
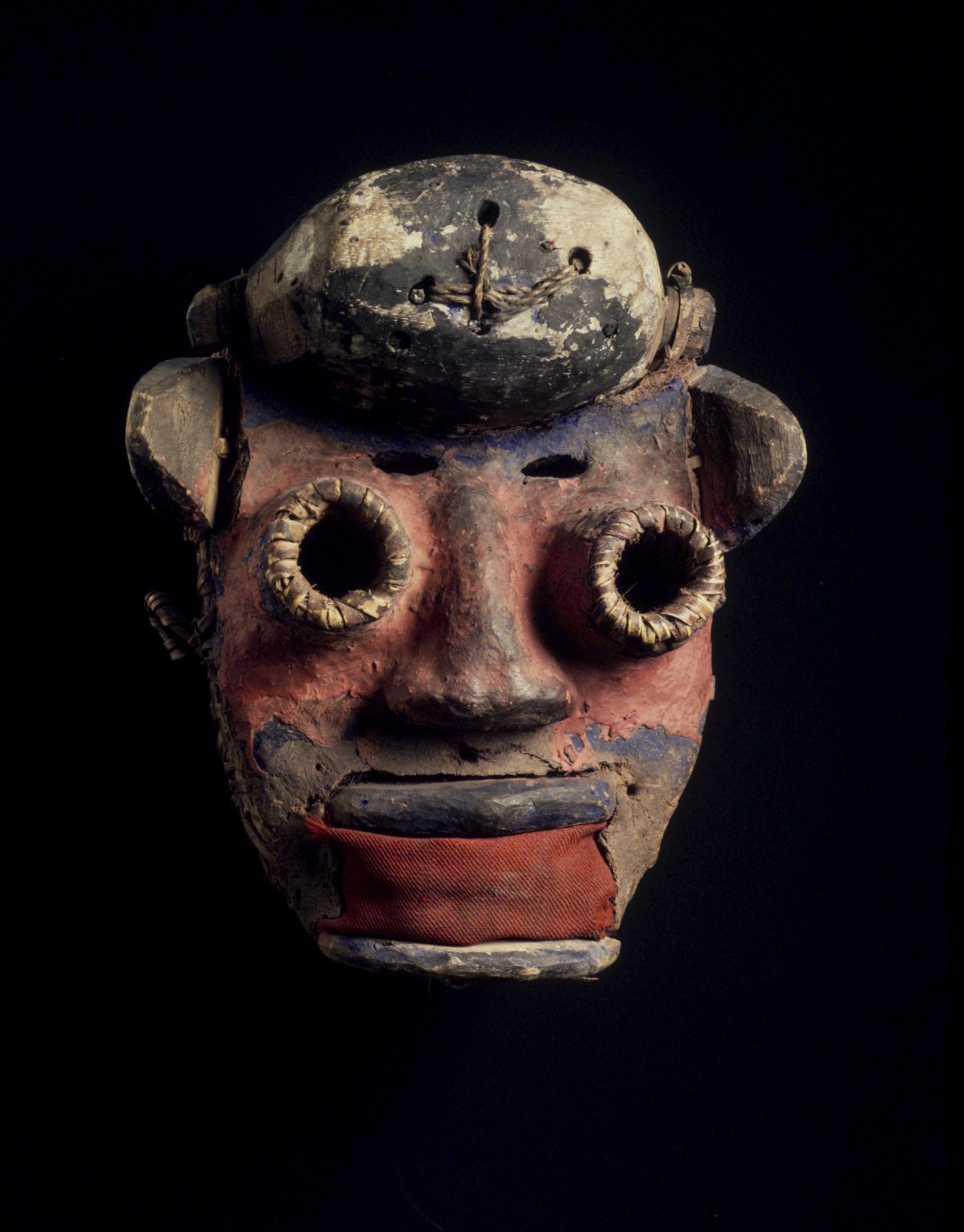
A mask of the We people at the Brooklyn Museum.

In 1903, Stewart Culin (1858–1929) became the founding curator of the Department of Ethnology at the Museum of the Brooklyn Institute of Arts and Sciences, now the Brooklyn Museum. Culin, a self-taught ethnologist, built the foundation of four curatorial collections for the Museum, acquiring objects representing African, Asian, Native American, and Eastern European cultures. Culin was among the first curators to recognize museum installation as an art form. He was also among the first to display ethnological collections as art objects, not as ethnographic specimens. This approach is evidenced in his exhibition "Primitive Negro Art, Chiefly from the Belgian Congo". The exhibition opened in April 1923, and displayed African objects he had acquired in Europe from dealers.

=== Barnes Foundation ===
Albert Barnes was one of the first American collectors to selectively acquire an extensive collection of African sculpture purely on aesthetic merits. In 1923, two years before the Barnes Foundation opening in Merion, Pennsylvania, Barnes wrote, "When the foundation opens, negro art will have a place among the great manifestations of all times." Through his active promotion of the foundation's collection of African sculpture and its aesthetic importance, Barnes himself played a critical role in fostering appreciation of African art in the United States in the early twentieth century.

=== Museum of Primitive Art and the Metropolitan Museum of Art ===
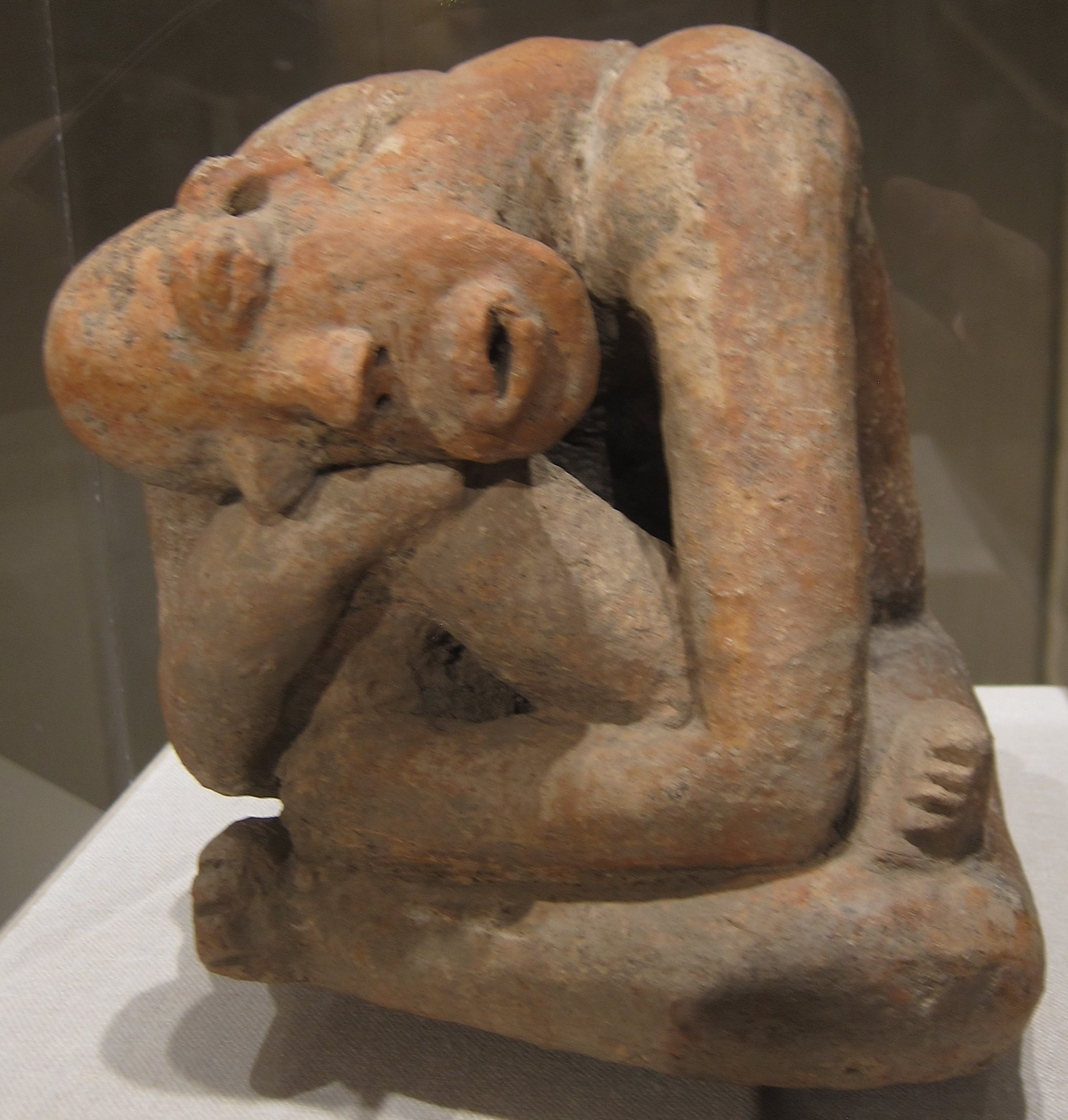
Terracotta seated figure from Mali; 13th century; earthenware; 29.9 cm (11 3/4 in) high; Metropolitan Museum of Art (New York City). The raised marks and indentations on the back of this hunched Djenné figure may represent disease or, more likely, sacrification patterns. The facial expression and pose could depict an individual in mouring or in pain

Founded in 1954 by Nelson A. Rockefeller and Rene d'Harnoncourt, the Museum of Primitive Art was the first art museum exclusively devoted to exhibiting and collecting works of art from Africa, Oceania, and the Americas for their aesthetic value rather than as ethnographic documents or colonial trophies. The museum closed in 1974, and its collection, staff and library were transferred to the Metropolitan Museum of Art according to an agreement made between Rockefeller and the Met in 1969. The Museum of Primitive Art was in many ways an outgrowth of the Museum of Modern Art (MoMA). It was located directly behind MoMA and was also built on Rockefeller-owned property. Rockefeller was MoMA's president and d'Harnoncourt was its director. MoMA's 1935 landmark exhibition African Negro Art was influential in shaping the director of the Museum of Primitive Art. Today, the Museum of Primitive Art collection is housed in the Metropolitan Michael C. Rockefeller Wing.

=== National Museum of African Art ===
The National Museum of African Art in Washington D.C. was founded by Warren M. Robbins in 1964 as a private and relatively small collection. In 1979 the collection, by then about 8,000 objects, was taken over by the Smithsonian Institution and is now housed in a central if underground location on the National Mall.

== Problems of display ==
Many scholars and curators have debated the efficacy of different modes of display of African art in Western museums. Generally, scholars agree that the Western art museum was, and continues to be, incompatible with the contexts from which most traditional African arts emerged. The following quotation from Kathleen Bickford Berzock and Christa Clarke's introduction to their book Representing Africa in American Art Museum summarizes the reasons for this incompatibility:

"Art museums reinforced hierarchies of value based on media or genre, favoring paintings and sculpture created solely for artistic appreciation. In contrast, the visual arts of Africa encompass not only sculpture in wood and metal but also beadwork, textiles, basketry, and other works of diverse media, all of which may hold equal value for their creators. And while aesthetics may guide the production of art in Africa, often there are other social, religious, or political concerns that inform its design and use. With this range of forms and materials and the different circumstances of creation and use within society, the diverse arts of Africa were not suited to the aesthetic hierarchies and systems of classification established by art museums. Moreover, museum practices of collecting and display emphasized the artist as individual genius, the school of artists working in a similar style and vein, and chronology. Such categorization was not easily replicated with African objects, which were often collected with fragmentary documentation that rarely identified the individual artist or the specific time period of creation."

Pan-African activists such as Mwazulu Diyabanza and the Front Multi Culturel Anti-Spoliation (Multicultural Front Against Pillaging) have taken direct action against European museums, taking items from the collections which they say to belong to Africa.

== Post-1980s African art ==
Post-1980s curatorial approaches to collecting and displaying historical African art tend towards greater specialization, broadening definitions, and a desire for contextualization.

Curatorial debate surrounds questions about where boundaries should be drawn between traditional and modern, between African and the African diaspora in the Americas and Europe, and between sub-Saharan and North African art. In certain instances, tradition-based and contemporary works have been exhibited together, a practice that began with the exhibition "Astonishment and Power: Kingo Minkisi & the Art of Renee Stout" at the National Museum of African Art in Washington, D.C. However, this exhibition was criticized for suggesting a cultural continuity between pre-modern African art and African-American art today while ignoring crucial cultural differences between these two bodies of work. The Benin artist Meschac Gaba's 2013 installation "Museum of Contemporary African Art" at Tate Modern responded to the fact that there was to date no museum of contemporary African art. In September, 2017, the Zeitz Museum of Contemporary Art Africa opened in Cape Town, South Africa.

== Notes ==
1.In 1903, the League of the Empire was founded in England with the aim of bringing children from different parts of the Empire into contact with one another through correspondence, lectures and exchanges. A distinguished group of museum directors and officials headed a sub-committee of the League entitled 'School Museum Committee.'
