= Culture of the Democratic Republic of the Congo =

The culture of the Democratic Republic of the Congo is extremely varied, reflecting the great diversity and different customs which exist in the country. Congolese culture combines the influence of tradition to the region, but also combines influences from abroad which arrived during the era of colonization and continue to have a strong influence, without destroying the individuality of many tribal customs.

== People, language and background ==
A map of the major Bantu languages in the Democratic Republic of the Congo

Like many African countries, the borders were drawn up by colonial powers, and bore little relation to the actual spread of ethno-linguistic groups. There are 242 languages spoken in the country, with perhaps a similar number of ethnic groups. Broadly speaking, there are four main population groups:

- Pygmies, the earliest inhabitants of the Congo, are generally hunter-gatherers. Expert in the ways of the forest, where they have resided for thousands of years, they live by trading meat with their taller farming neighbors in exchange for agricultural products. Increasingly, they are assimilating into non-Pygmy society and adopting the latter's languages and customs.
- Bantus arrived in the Congo in several waves from 2000 BC to 500 AD, mainly from the area in what is now southern Nigeria. They are by far the largest group, and the majority live as subsistence-farmers. They are present in almost every part of the country, and their languages make up three of the DRC's five officially recognized languages. Among these are Kikongo ya leta (also called "Kikongo" outside the Kongo Central province), Lingala and Tshiluba. Kikongo ya leta is spoken in Kongo Central, in Kwango and in Kwilu provinces, and was promoted by the Belgian colonial administration. Lingala, spoken in the capital Kinshasa, is increasingly understood throughout the country, as the lingua franca of trade, spoken along the vast Congo river and its many tributaries. Lingala's status as the language of the national army, as well as its use in the lyrics of popular Congolese music, has encouraged its adoption, and it is now the most prominent language in the country. Tshiluba (also known as Chiluba and Luba-Kasai) is spoken in the southeastern Kasai regions.
- Bantus also brought in the fourth of the DRC's official languages, Kingwana — a Congolese dialect of Swahili. Note that the fifth language, French, is the official language of government, a result of Congo's colonial relationship with Belgium. These Swahili-speaking Bantus are related to the other Bantus mentioned above, but tend to differ in their way of life, in that they practice herding as well as farming. They came from the various countries to the east of Congo: Rwanda, Uganda, Burundi and Tanzania, bringing with them many of the ethnic rivalries that have inflamed recent conflicts.
- The northeastern part of the country is inhabited by groups who are believed to have originally come from the southern Sudan region. In general, these are cattle herders and include the Tutsi. These migrants also entered Rwanda and Burundi around the same time, often mixing with the settled groups.

The above descriptions are by necessity simplified. Many Congolese are multilingual, and the language used depends on the context. For instance, a government official might use French to set a tone of formality and authority with another official, use Lingala when buying goods at a market, and the local language when in his home village. English is also spoken, especially in the east where eastern and southern African influences have spread in the post-Mobutu era. Among the slangs spoken in Congo, Indubil has been noted since around the 1960s, and continues to evolve nowadays.

Mixed marriages between ethnic groups are common, particularly in urban areas where many different groups live side by side. Europeans appear in small numbers throughout the country, as missionaries in the countryside, and as businessmen and traders in the cities. Also acting as merchants are small numbers of Lebanese and Pakistanis.

More information on the various peoples in Congo can be found in the Early Congolese History article.

== Religion and belief ==
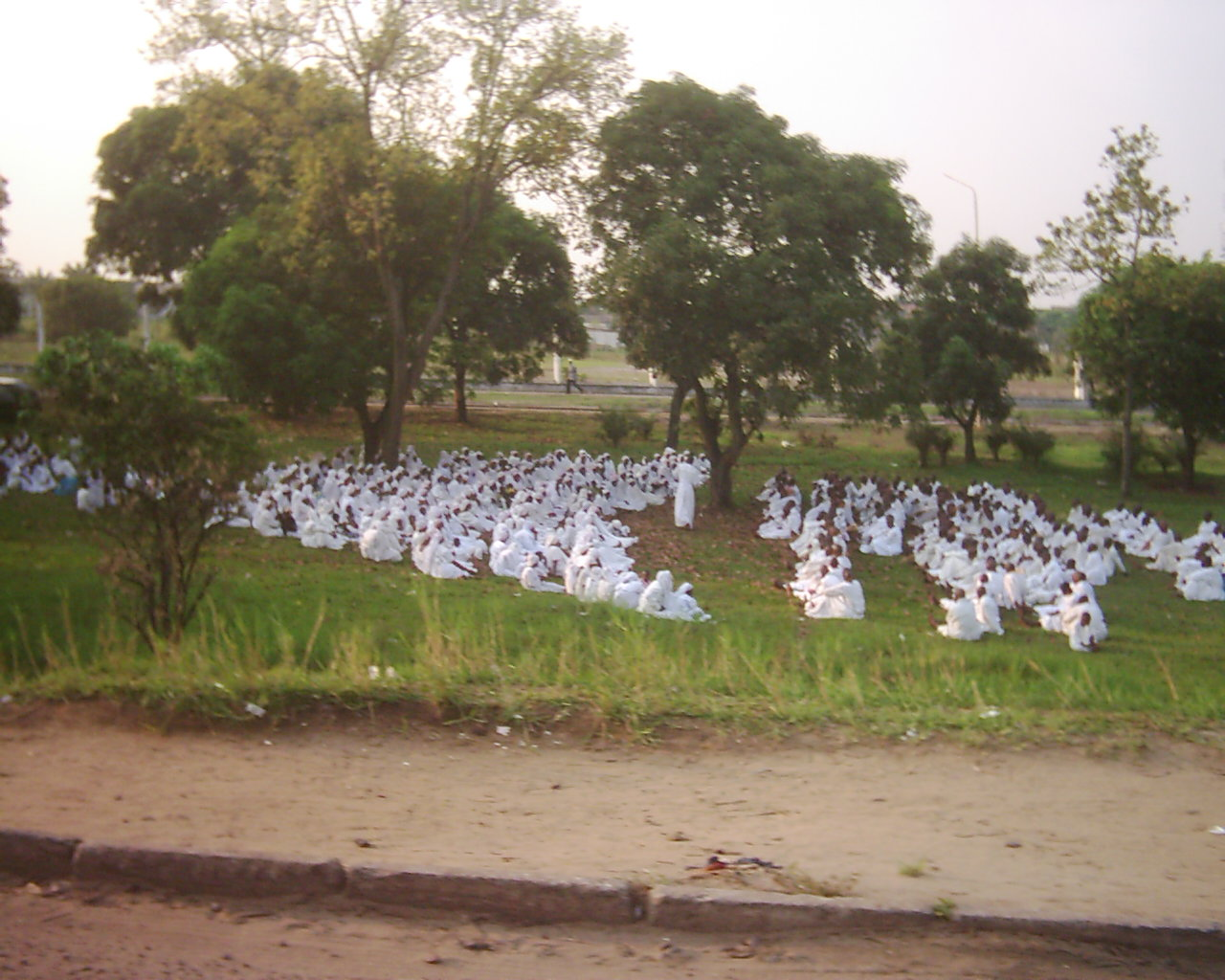
Christian worshippers in Kinshasa

The main religions in the DRC are:

- Indigenous traditional beliefs: 11.5%
- Catholic Christianity: 50%
- Protestant Christianity: 20%
- Indigenous Christianity: 13.5%, nearly all of whom (13%) are followers of Kimbanguism.
- Other Christian denominations: 1%
- Islam: 1.5%

There are small communities of Jews and Hindus who work in commercial urban areas. Atheism is very rare.

=== Indigenous traditional beliefs ===
Though only 11.5 per cent of Congolese exclusively follow indigenous beliefs, these traditional belief systems are often intermingled with forms of Christianity, and are familiar to the majority of Congolese. Throughout the DRC the beliefs take on a number of forms, but they have a number of things in common:

- A creator spirit is thought to be sovereign of the spirit world, but this god is rarely the direct cause of events. In many Congolese languages, the name of the creator god derives from the word father or maker. Some groups regard the creator as being omnipresent, whilst others believe the god lives in the sky. For most believers in indigenous religions, contact with the creator god is made via ancestor spirits. A smaller number of groups believe that individuals can have direct contact.
- A belief in an essential life-force which animates the body; the force is thought to leave the body upon death and become an ancestor spirit. These spirits continue to be active in the lives of living relatives—by either punishing or rewarding them. In a similar way to saints in the Catholic tradition, some long-dead ancestors (for instance, great hunters or religious leaders) are venerated by people outside their former family.
- Nature spirits, worshiped mainly in forested regions, are often the embodiment of particular locations such as whirlpools, springs and mountains. The afterlife is believed to exist underground, especially under lakes, where ghostly replicas of Congolese villages reside.
- Diviners, witches, dream interpreters and healers act as conduits for supernatural forces.
- Ceremonies and collective prayers—to ancestors, nature spirits and the creator god—are generally performed at particular locations such as sacred trees, grottoes or crossroads. These ceremonies usually take place at a specific time of day. The location and times vary according to the ethnic group.

Belief in Witchcraft is common, and sometimes intersects with the more fundamentalist and evangelical versions of Christianity. In recent years, these beliefs have gained adherents in urban areas, whereas before they were mainly confined to the countryside. The increasing beliefs in witches and sorcery have tended to mirror the social decay caused by war and poverty. Many of the street children that roam the Congo's cities have been cast out of their families after being denounced as witches. These homeless 'witch children' often live in cemeteries and only come out at night, and follow occult practices. See BBC News article on Kinshasa's street children. For comparison, see article on beliefs of Miami street children.

=== Catholic and Protestant Christianity ===
A Congolese Christian.

Christianity has a long history in Congo, dating back to 1484, when the Portuguese arrived and convinced the king and entourage of the Kongo people to convert. In 1506, a Portuguese-supported candidate for kingship, Alfonso I of Kongo won the throne. Alfonso (the Kongo royal family had begun to take on Portuguese names), established relations with the Vatican. More widespread conversion occurred during the Belgian colonial era. Christianity varies in its forms, and is in some ways surprisingly similar to native beliefs.

During the colonial period, a European-style Christianity was at first promoted by the authorities. Native Congolese generally attended different churches or services from whites. If they worshiped under the same roof, the native Congolese sat on benches at the back, while the whites sat in chairs at the front. Towards the end of the colonial era, more African elements were incorporated into Christianity, including songs and dances which were formerly condemned as pagan. Eventually, even native fables and myths were appropriated and merged into Congolese Christianity, in a similar process to that which occurred with Christianity in Europe.

Recent developments include the increasing popularity of the "Gospel of Prosperity" – a form of Christianity in which the emphasis is on wealth acquisition and born-again Christianity. Adherents are led to believe that instant wealth and magical prosperity will result from giving tithes to their charismatic preacher. The leaders often draw on the techniques of American televangelists, and the message is appealing to those living in extreme poverty.

=== Kimbanguism ===
In the first half of the 20th century, prophetic movements sprang up. Their nature was both anti-colonial and Christian, and led to a rigorous crackdown by the authorities.

Simon Kimbangu was the prophet of the largest of these movements. He was born in a village near Kinshasa, raised and educated by a Protestant Christian mission and trained to become a priest. In April 1921, at the age of 39, he reportedly had a religious vision of Jesus Christ, who called on him to reconvert his people and dedicate his life to Christ. Kimbangu chose to try to ignore the vision, and fled to Kinshasa where he abandoned his life as a priest and took to menial work. More visions came, and eventually he heeded the calling and returned to his home village and started to devote his life to Christ.

Soon after, he is reported to have healed a sick woman by laying his hands on her. Dozens of apparent miracles were subsequently performed by Kimbangu, and he gained followers from surrounding villages and towns. The official Catholic organizations protested to the authorities, and the Protestant church abandoned him. The economic effects of Kimbangu's ministry were being felt, with thousands of Congolese leaving their work to listen to Kimbangu speak. In June the Belgians arrested him for inciting revolution and civil disobedience. Four months later he was sentenced to death. After an international outcry, Albert I of Belgium commuted the sentence to life imprisonment. He died 30 years later in prison, in 1951.

Colonial authorities assumed his movement would wither after his imprisonment and death, but the church continued to flourish underground, and was an effective weapon in the fight against colonialism. In the post-colonial era, its record has been more mixed. Instead of banning the church, Mobutu used a far more effective method of neutralizing it: namely co-opting the church and giving it an official status. Kimbanguism has now spread across the country, and now has branches in nine of the surrounding countries, making it the most popular "native" form of Christianity in Africa. Followers do not smoke, drink alcohol and abhor violence. Monogamy is practiced.

=== Religion today ===
Article 22 of the constitution allows for religious freedom. These rights are generally respected by the government. Religious tension exists in some areas because of the link between prophetic groups and paramilitary organizations. In the turbulent eastern region, where the Second Congo War still simmers, some guerrilla groups have a major religious element, believing for instance that they are able to turn enemy bullets into water by wearing certain fetishes.

== Cuisine ==
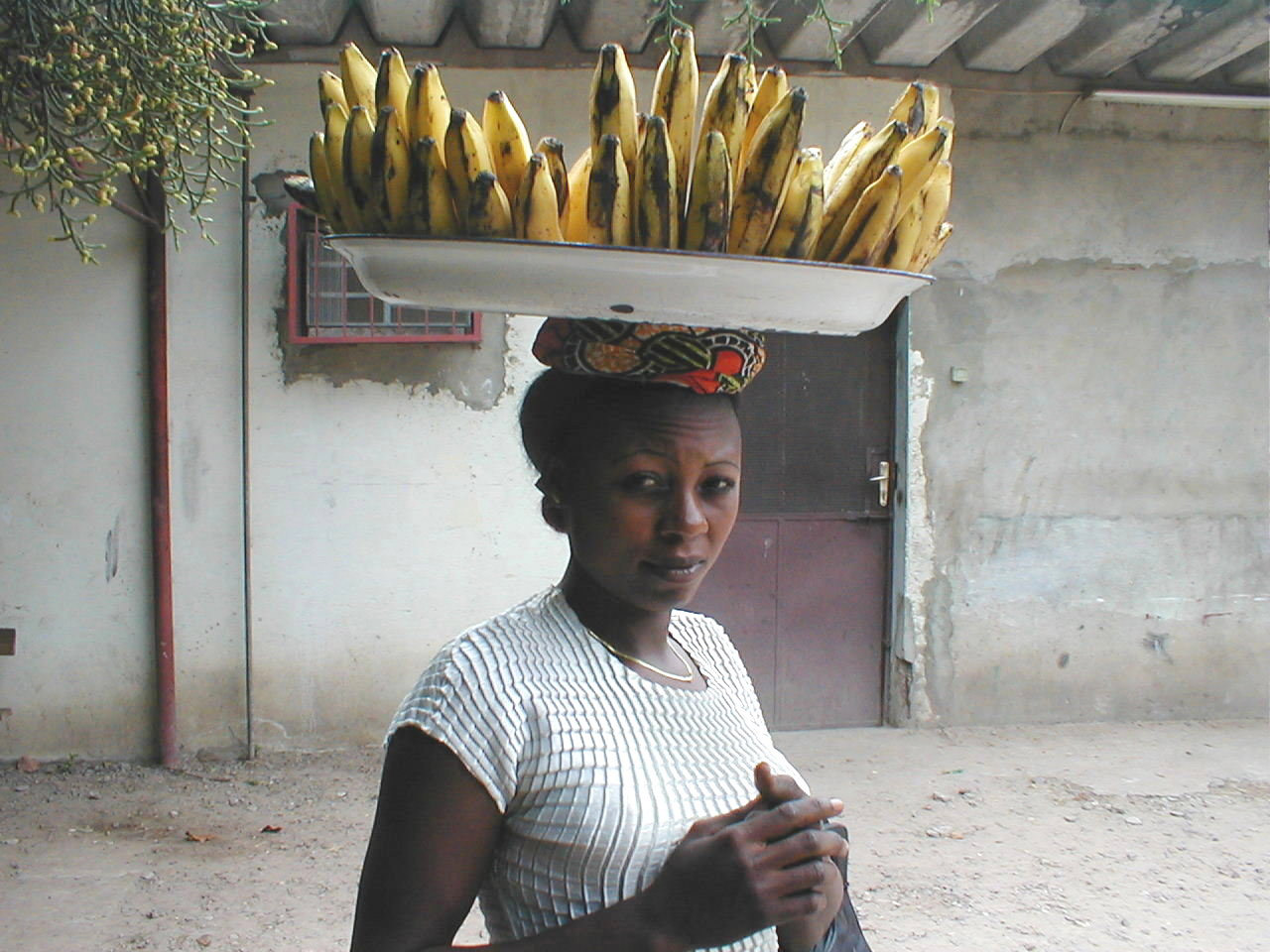
A woman carrying bananas.

Only 2.86% of the land is cultivated, and most of this is used for subsistence farming. People gather wild fruit, mushrooms, and honey, as well as hunt and fish. They will often sell these crops at markets or by the roadside. Cattle breeding and the development of large-scale agricultural businesses has been hindered by the recent war and the poor quality of the road system.

Congo's farmland is the source of a wide variety of crops. These include maize, rice, cassava (manioc), sweet potato, yam, taro, plantain, tomato, pumpkin and varieties of peas and nuts. These foods are eaten throughout the country, but there are also regional dishes. The most important crops for export are coffee and palm oil.

The national dish of the Democratic Republic of the Congo is moambe chicken, which consists of roasted chicken braised in palm nut which is mashed and extracted from the fruit of African palm oil trees. The chicken and sauce are paired with onion, garlic, chili, and fresh tomato and served over rice. Ingredients like peanuts, chicken, and yams are popular within many cuisines in the Congo.

Another dish in the area is Liboké, containing chicken, fish, and vegetables wrapped in banana leaves. Once wrapped in the leaves, the dish is boiled, steamed, or put in the oven.

Cuisine varies in the different regions of the Democratic Republic of the Congo but fufu is a popular dish in all of the Congo. Fufu is made from cassava, yams, or plantains which are boiled and shaped into balls. Fufu is served as a side to many dishes and has many health benefits such as reducing inflammation and promoting digestive health.

== Music ==
Congolese musicians, like Le Grand Kallé or TPOK Jazz with their emblematic lead singer Franco Luambo Makiadi, were extremely influential in pioneering the musical style of African rumba in the years leading up to the independence of the Belgian Congo. After that, Congolese musicians were supported by the Mobutu regime in Zaire, and many Congolese musicians became very successful on the international market for African popular music.

== Cinema ==
In the years following independence, the nascent Congolese film industry was held up by many years of war. However, the first Congolese feature film (La Vie est Belle by the celebrated director Mwezé Ngangura) was released in 1987. In recent years, Congolese cinema has reached a wider audience, though the growth of the industry is restricted by the small profits which directors can make (owing to unauthorized distribution) and rarity of credit.

== Literature ==
Congolese literature in French began to develop during the colonial period, particularly around La Voix du Congolais, founded in 1945. Early figures included Antoine-Roger Bolamba and Paul Lomami-Tshibamba, whose work contributed to the emergence of modern Congolese literature.

Later Congolese literature includes the novelist, poet and scholar V. Y. Mudimbe, as well as contemporary writers such as In Koli Jean Bofane, Fiston Mwanza Mujila, Sinzo Aanza and Blaise Ndala.

== Traditional cultural heritage and contemporary fine art ==
Due to their distinctive styles and the global interest in African culture, Congolese art and artists are known on an international level. Traditional art of the more than 100 ethnic groups includes masks, wooden or ivory statues, textiles and other woven artifacts. Opened in November 2019, the new National Museum of the DRC presents both traditional and immaterial cultural heritage, such as music, as well as contemporary art.

Notable contemporary artists are Chéri Samba and Bodys Isek Kingelez. Apart from these, other successful artists are Lema Kusa (painting), Alfred Liyolo (sculpture), Roger Botembe (painting), Nshole (painting), Henri Kalama Akulez (painting), Mavinga (painting), Freddy Tsimba (sculpture), Claudy Khan (painting). Some are teaching at the Académie de Beaux-Arts de Kinshasa, which is the only fine arts academy on a university level in the country. From July 11, 2015 to January 10, 2016, the Fondation Cartier in Paris presented a retrospective exhibition of 90 years of Congolese modern and contemporary art, curated by French art collector André Magnin, with a catalogue entitled Beauté Congo. 1926–2015. Congo kitoko.

== Pre-colonial art ==
=== Masks ===
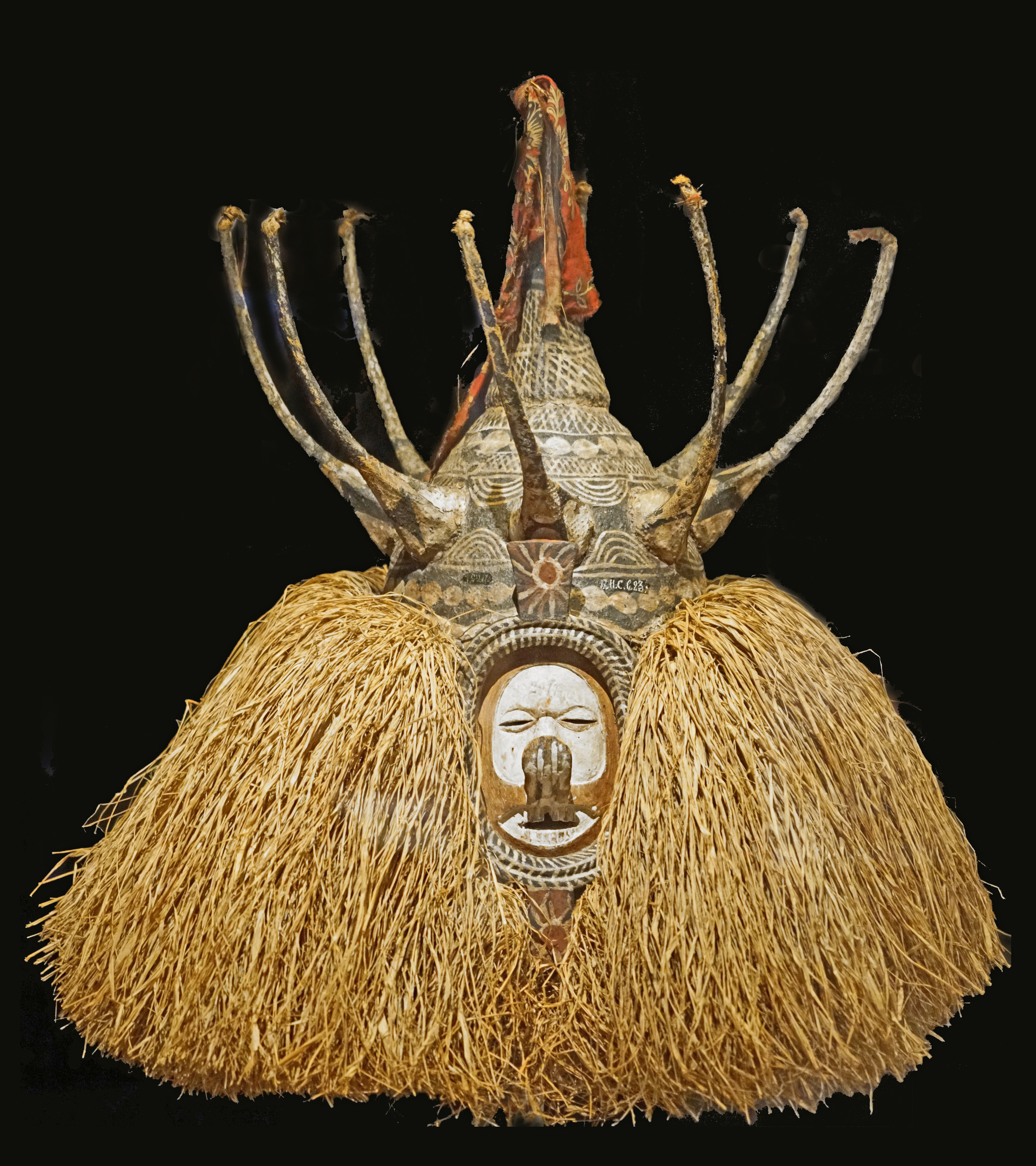
Ndeemba Mask

Masks served many diverse functions to the numerous communities that inhabited what is now the Democratic Republic of Congo. Masks typically depicted anthropomorphic qualities and were used for initiations and storytelling.

The Yaka people used eccentric raffia masks like the Ndeemba to initiate young men from the realm of childhood and women to the sphere of men. In the performance, the mask-wearer would ridicule women and celebrate the virility of men to emphasize gender differences.

Other communities like the Chokwe had similar gender divides, but celebrated the role of mothers in the gender initiations through masks depicting women such as the Pwo mask. Although women were not allowed to perform in the rituals, the sorrow of the mother losing her son to the sphere of men was portrayed in the ceremonies.

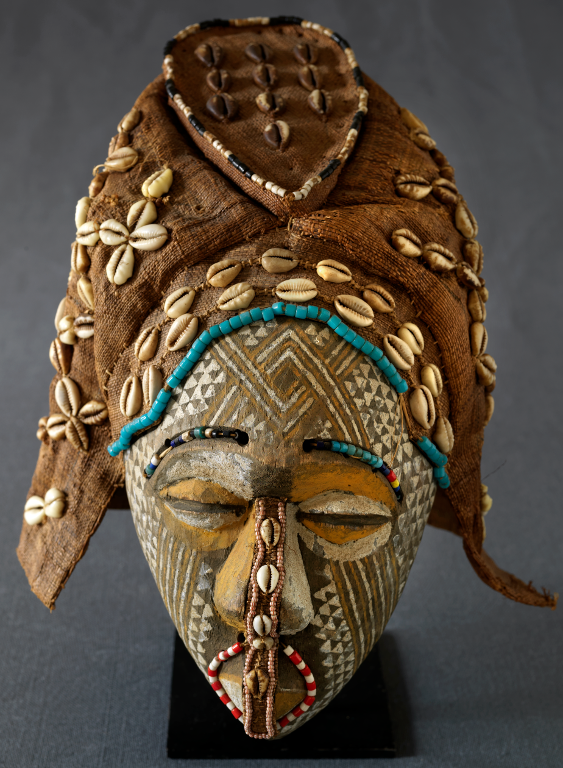
Masque féminin Ngaady a mwaash, XIX-XXe siècles

The role of women was celebrated by groups like the Kuba. The Kuba’s Ngaady a Mwaash, for instance, was commissioned by the queen who wanted to highlight women’s contributions to the royal court. The highly decorated mask was worn along with two other men who portrayed the king and a foreigner. In the ceremony the two men would mock-fight for the affections of the queen. The performance used storytelling to manifest the significance of women and their contributions to the political and social aspects of Kuba life Women and men were included in certain societies, like the Bwami society of the Lega people.

The Bwami guided moral and individual development in a community and believed that physical beauty and integrity were interlinked. The Bwami mask’s intricate details reflected these beliefs and were worn in songs or dances to demonstrate proverbs and pass wisdom on to initiates.

African masks influenced Western art particularly in the Cubism movement by artists like Pablo Picasso. However, African masks were also influential during the Harlem Renaissance when Black American artists wanted to incorporate artistic traditions from Africa to express their culture and unity during a time of segregation.

=== Sculpture ===
Certain sculptures in the Congo were designed to be interacted with as they were believed to contain spiritual properties. The Kongo peoples believed that sacred medicines and divine protection were sent from the heavens to earth through vessels called nkisi. Nkisi contains and releases supernatural forces and were often used to settle disputes. The spirits were activated by inserting a peg or nail into the nkisi containing the disputing/affected parties saliva, and either positive or negative repercussions were released depending on if the oath made by the parties was upheld. Nkisi were mainly destroyed by missionaries when the area was colonized. However, artistic traditions relating to them are present in contemporary art in the Democratic Republic of Congo. For instance, the idea of physical manifestations that alter one’s relationship with the world is a spiritual element possessed in contemporary Congo art.

=== Storytelling ===
Art in the Congo was typically used as a medium for storytelling or passing on ancestral legacies. For instance, the Luba Kingdom used art to chart their history in an unconventional way. The Luba people used lukasas or memory boards which had various sized beads of different materials arranged in a particular way where one could only read and recount it with extensive training. Reading the lukasa was a symbol of power and was considered sacred so only kings and the elite were trained to read it.

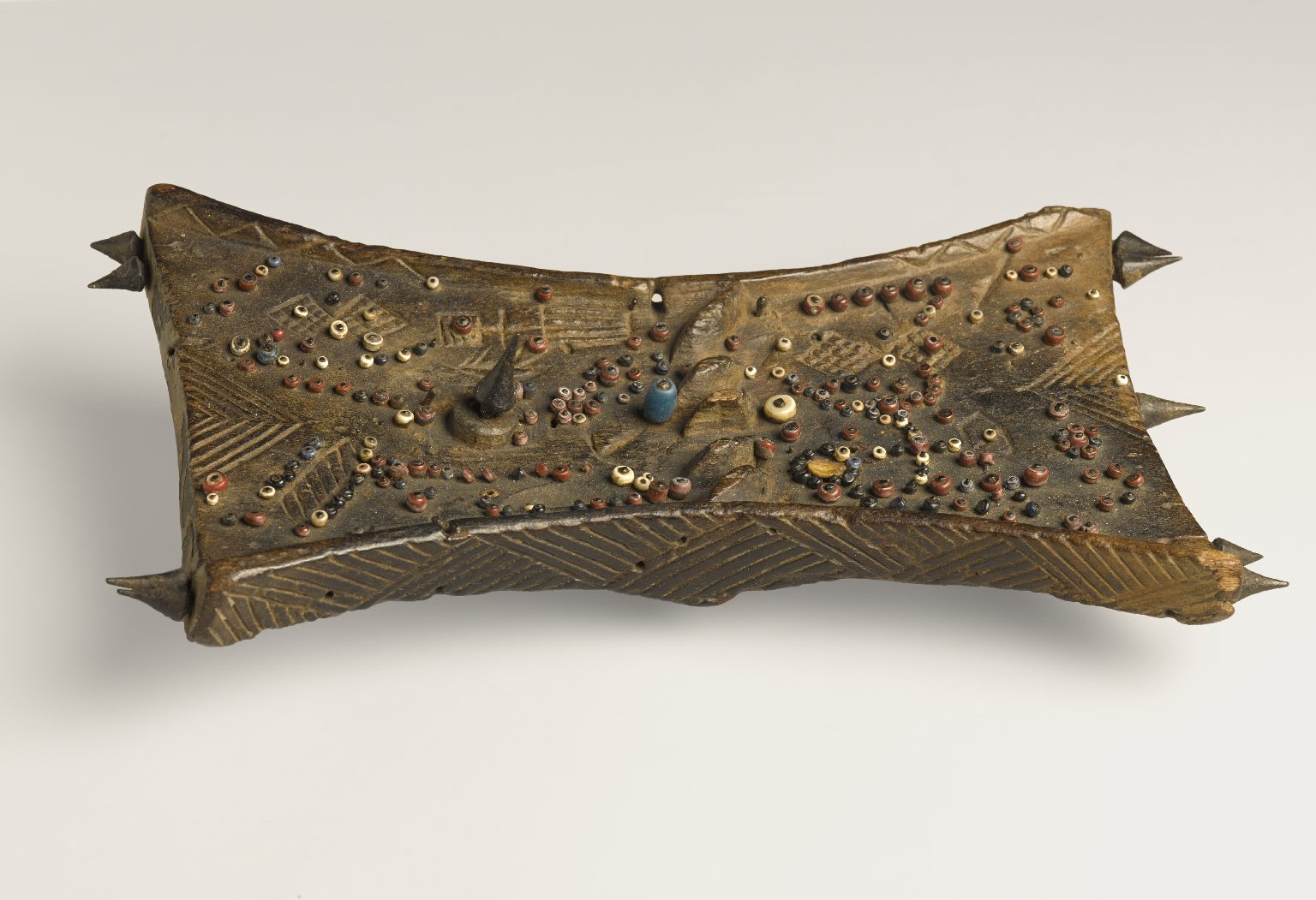
Memory Board (lukasa) - Luba Kingdom

It served as a memory aid that describes the legends and history of the Luba kingdom and the royal line. The lukasa exemplified artistic traditions of the Congo by employing texture as a means of storytelling and encouraged storytellers to physically interact with the artwork. Contemporary Congo art possesses the abstract stylistic traditions while also inviting the viewer to form a tangible relationship with the art. Furthermore, the importance of storytelling through unconventional methods is preserved within contemporary art through the use of formal elements like color, texture, and arrangement which evoke a feeling or display a narrative.

== See also ==
- Media of the Democratic Republic of the Congo
