= Shaje Tshiluila =

Anthropologist and museum exeucutive

Josette Shaje a Tshiluila (born 1949) is an anthropologist and museum executive in the Democratic Republic of the Congo.

== Life ==
Tshiluila was born on 5 March 1949 in Likasi, Zaire (now the Democratic Republic of the Congo). She was educated at Albert I College, Kinshasa, and at Lovanium University and the University of Lubumbashi. In 1974 she married Babi-Banga N'Sampuka.

In 1973 Tshiluila joined the Institut des Musées nationaux du Zaïre. She was Head of the Traditional Art Section from 1983 to 1986, and appointed Deputy Director-General in 1987. In 1986 she became the Director of the Kinshasa Museum. In 1990 she was made a Professor at the University of Kinshasa.

== Works ==
- Tshiluila, Shaje (1987). "Inventorying movable cultural property : National Museum Institute of Zaire". Museum. 39 (1): 50–1. doi:10.1111/j.1468-0033.1987.tb00666.x.
- 'Cultural Heritage in Zaire : towards Museums for Development'. 1995.
- 'Le trafic illicite', in Caroline Gaultier-Kurhan, ed., Patrimoine culturel africain, 2001, pp. 299–319
- 'An African view of ethnographic collections in Europe and Africa'. 2002
- 'The sacred forests of the Bakongos', in Nature and culture in the Democratic Republic of Congo, pp. 112–117
