= Académie des Beaux-Arts (Kinshasa) =

Arts school in the Democratic Republic of the Congo

Coordinates: 4.3208614°S 15.2931968°E

Kinshasa Academy of Fine Arts
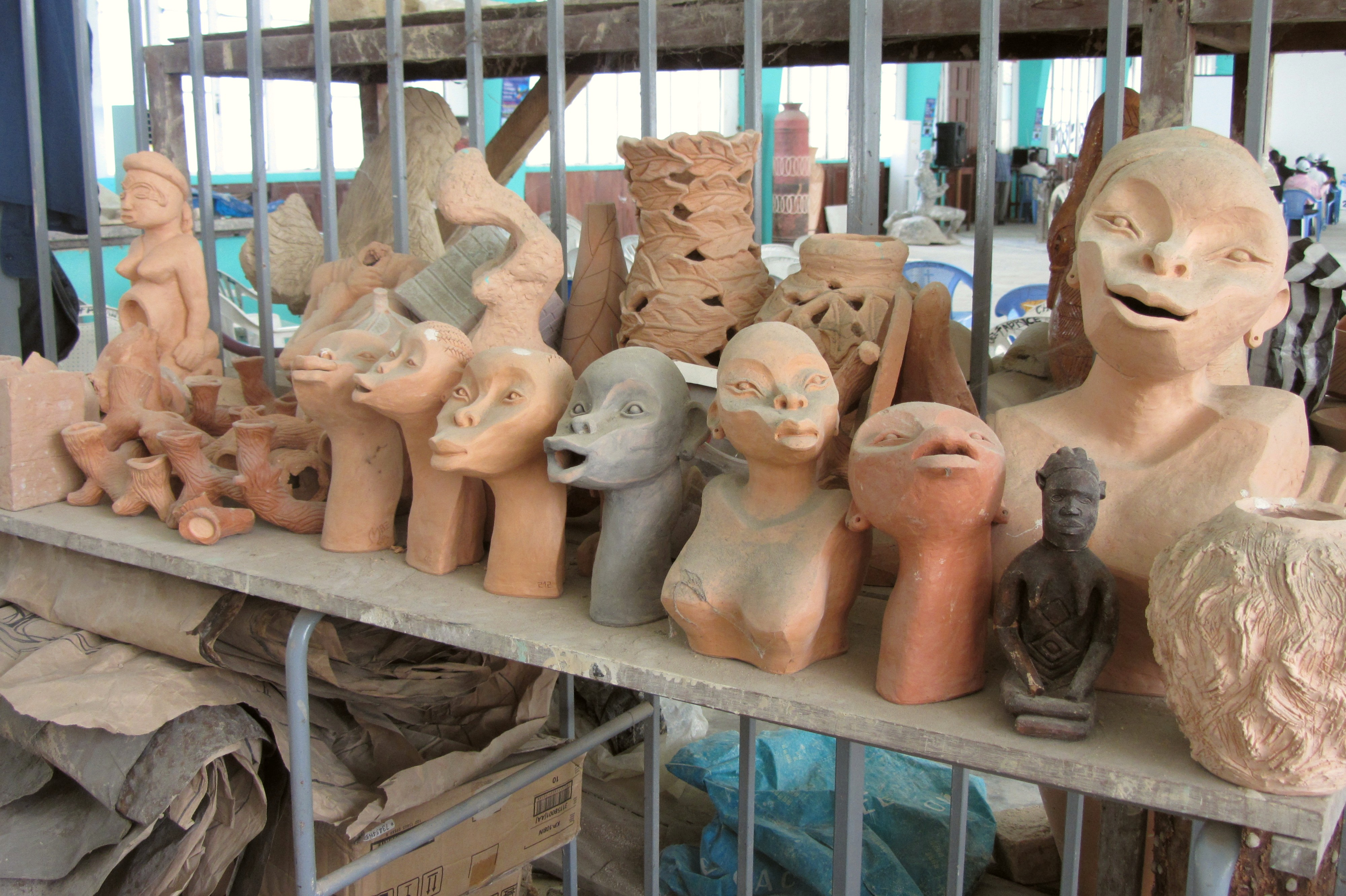
- Terracotta sculptures created by students at the academy
- Latin: Académie des Beaux-Arts de Kinshasa
- Type: Public art school
- Established: 15 August 1943; 83 years ago
- Founder: Marc Stanislas (born Victor Arnold Wallenda)
- Accreditation: Ministère de l'Enseignement Supérieur et Universitaire
- Director general: Henri Kalama Akulez
- Location: Gombe, Kinshasa, Democratic Republic of the Congo
- Campus: Urban
- Website: site.academie-kinshasa.cd

The Académie des Beaux-Arts de Kinshasa (ABA-KIN), also known in English as the Kinshasa Academy of Fine Arts, is a public art institution specializing in visual arts, graphic design, and arts education. Located in Gombe, Kinshasa, it is regarded as one of the most influential art schools in Central Africa and has played a major role in the development of modern Congolese art.

The institution was founded in 1943 as the École Saint-Luc à Gombe-Matadi in the present-day Kongo Central province by Belgian missionary Brother Marc Stanislas Wallenda of the congregation of the Brothers of the Christian Schools. Initially focused on sculpture, the school expanded into visual and graphic arts after its transfer to Kinshasa and its renaming as the Académie des Beaux-Arts in 1957. Over time, it introduced programs in painting (1950), ceramics (1953), advertising (1970), interior design (1970), and metalwork (1971). It has since trained generations of Congolese artists, designers, and cultural professionals. In the 2012–2013 academic year, it introduced conservation and restoration studies for graduates in visual arts.

== History ==
=== 1930s–mid-1940s: Founding and early development ===
Ethnologist and art historian Joseph-Aurélien Cornet noted that one of the most notable aspects of Belgium's educational history is the achievement of higher education institutions within the country's independent (private) education sector. Operated by the Congregation of the Brothers of the Christian Schools (Frères des Écoles Chrétiennes), the institutions collectively known as Saint-Luc expanded throughout the late nineteenth century by establishing numerous art schools in Ghent, Brussels, Schaerbeek, Mons, Namur, and Liège. It was the Institut Saint-Luc de Liège that became the basis of art education in the Belgian Congo. The idea of opening a branch of the Saint-Luc schools in the Belgian Congo had been considered since 1933. Brother Denis, who had previously directed the Institut Saint-Luc de Ghent, hoped to expand the educational work initiated by his fellow brothers in the Belgian Congo following King Leopold II's 1908 appeal through the introduction of a more diverse curriculum. Although the proposal had existed for several years, it was only in 1939 that it began to move forward practically. Victor Arnold Wallenda, a native of Liège, was born into a family closely associated with the performing arts, as his grandfather owned the city's Cirque des Variétés.

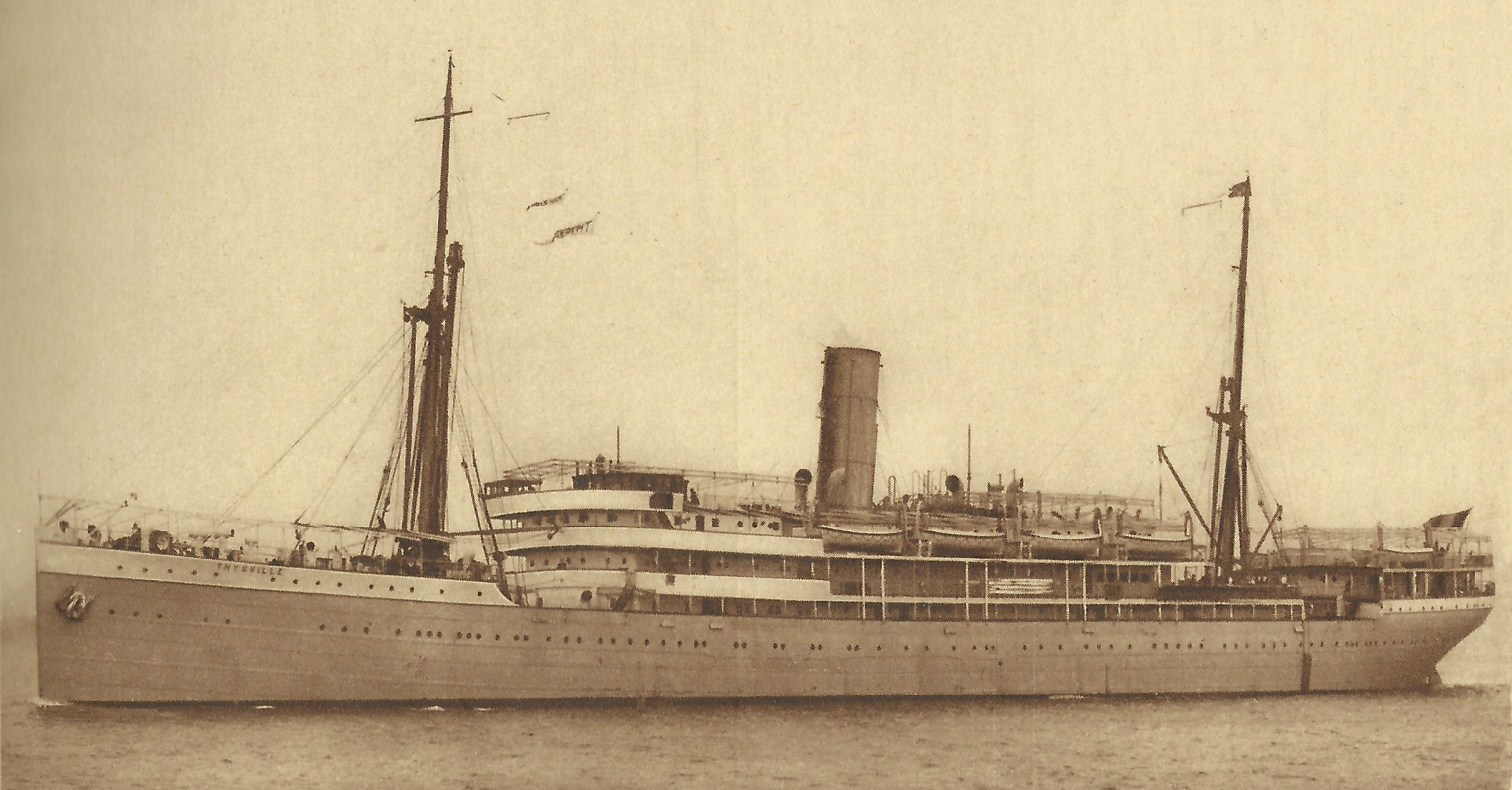
SS Thysville, the ship that transported Wallenda to the Belgian Congo in October 1939.

After completing his elementary education, Wallenda enrolled at the Institut Saint-Luc de Liège, where he studied painting and sculpture. He later chose the consecrated religious life, inspired by the religious brothers who taught him. He shared his decision with Brother Denis, who was then the Assistant Superior General of the congregation. After taking the religious name Brother Marc-Stanislas, he looked forward to becoming a missionary and, upon completing his novitiate in April 1937, graduated from the painting section of the Institut Saint-Luc de Tournai. He then returned to the Institut Saint-Luc de Liège the next academic year to continue his artistic training. However, the outbreak of the Second World War disrupted his plans. Wallenda was serving in the armed forces and was demobilized on 9 October, leaving him only two days to prepare before departing aboard the SS Thysville for the Belgian Congo on 11 October 1939. Once in the colony, he worked with fellow brothers at the Institut Tumba Kunda Dia Zayi, a school established in 1921 in the Kwilu Ngongo sector of Mbanza-Ngungu Territory. In 1941, he was transferred to Gombe-Matadi near Thysville (the present-day Mbanza-Ngungu commune), where he supervised the construction of the first Saint-Luc art school.

Although the building walls had been completed, financial limitations forced the school to use a thatched roof instead of the corrugated metal roofing commonly found at Catholic missions of the period. During a visit to Léopoldville (present-day Kinshasa), Wallenda met Guilherme d'Oliveira Marques, known as the "Painter of the Congo". Marques suggested organizing an exhibition of his paintings to raise funds and donated more than 60 works for the event, which was held at Albert I College (now Boboto College) on a Sunday morning. The exhibition was a success, with all paintings sold by 4:30 pm, which then provided enough money to complete the school's roofing.

The school was officially opened at Gombe-Matadi on 15 August 1943, and its first students, André Lufwa Mawidi and Jacob Wineguane, enrolled the next month. From the beginning, Wallenda rejected simple imitation of traditional sculpture and encouraged students to develop their own artistic expressions. In 1945, another exhibition of his paintings in Léopoldville raised funds for essential tools, equipment, and materials, while a further exhibition in 1946 continued to support the young institution. Wallenda faced resistance from some colonial authorities who opposed providing advanced artistic education to Black Congolese people, as such opportunities had largely been reserved for Europeans. Nevertheless, his "optimism convinced him that Africans possessed the same abilities as Europeans".

=== 1949–1969: Relocation to Léopoldville and expansion ===
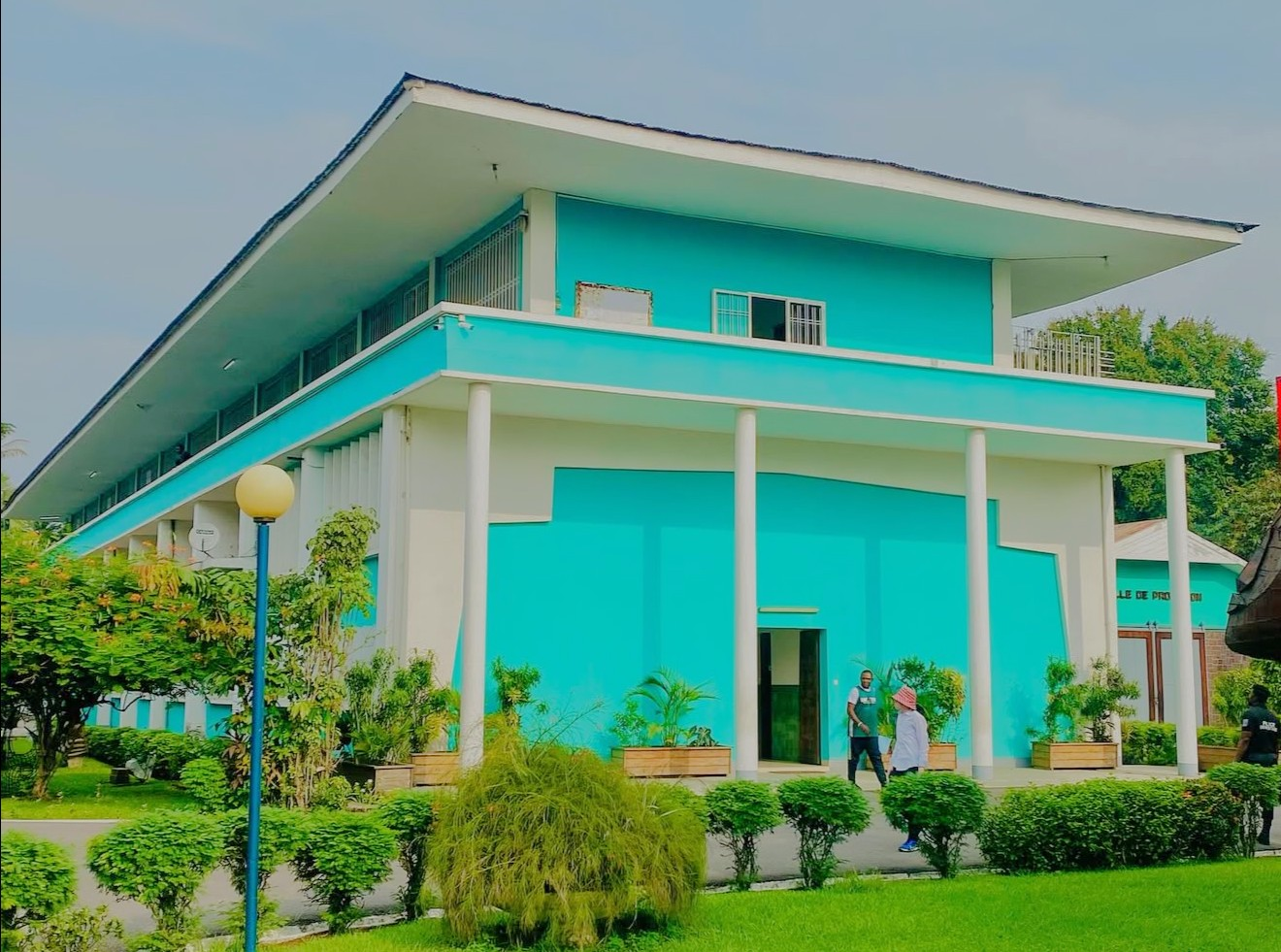
The Académie des Beaux-Arts de Kinshasa in June 2025

By the late 1940s, Wallenda recognized that the expanding art school would benefit from being located in Léopoldville rather than in the rural setting of Bas-Congo. In 1949, the Colonial Ministry allocated a 10-hectare site on Avenue Josephine Charlotte (now Avenue de la Libération) for the institution. Wallenda again took on the roles of fundraiser and construction organizer to make the project possible. Two years later, the first buildings were completed, and the school was accredited as the École officielle des Beaux-Arts Saint-Luc. The institution gradually expanded its academic offerings and introduced painting in 1950, ceramic in 1953, and architectural design in 1958. In 1957, the École officielle des Beaux-Arts Saint-Luc was renamed the Académie des Beaux-Arts (ABA) de Léopoldville ("Academy of Fine Arts of Léopoldville"). Lufwa later became the first Congolese member of the teaching staff. Following the government's decision in 1966 to restore pre-colonial names to major cities, Léopoldville was renamed Kinshasa on 30 June. The academy consequently adopted its current name, the Académie des Beaux-Arts de Kinshasa. The 1960 reforms expanded the curriculum to include artistic humanities programs. This expansion continued in 1968 with the creation of the Higher Institute of Visual Arts (Institut supérieur des arts plastiques; ISAP), which was established under the direction of Brother André Lafarge Bembika. Its academic direction was provided by archaeologist and art historian Brother Joseph-Aurélien Cornet, and it trained artists with practical skills and strong analytical abilities.

From 1958 to 1968, the ABA-KIN's reforms focused on architecture and the visual arts. Brothers Manuel Vanditen, Frans Jan Van Strydonck, and Henri Vandermeeren oversaw the development of architectural education, while Brother Maxence Evrard developed the visual arts curriculum with assistance from Brother André Lafarge from 1965 onward. Lufwa produced several of the Congo's best-known public sculptures, including the Batteur du Tam-Tam, a white cement monument installed at the entrance to the first Foire Internationale de Kinshasa (FIKIN) in 1969. His other notable works include the imitation-stone leopards at the entrance to the Presidential Gardens on Mont Ngaliema and Voyageur on the grounds of the Ministry of Foreign Affairs.

=== 1960–present: Educational reforms, integration into higher education, and modern developments ===
In 1970, the ABA-KIN established the advertising and interior design section, followed by the creation of the metalworking section in 1971. The 1971 higher education reforms merged the country's 17 technical institutes and three universities into the National University of Zaire, and the Higher Institute of Visual Arts and the Institute of Architecture became part of the Institute of Buildings and Public Works (Institut des bâtiments et des travaux publics; IBTP), formerly the National Institute of Public Works (Institut national des travaux publics; INPT). Bembika was appointed general director, while Me Liyolo Limbe M'puanga headed the visual arts sections and architect Mukadi Mbayi directed the architecture section. Under Ordinance Law No. 01-170 of 7 October 1981, the ABA-KIN was integrated into the network of national higher technical institutes (instituts supérieurs techniques).

In the 2012–2013 academic year, the ABA-KIN introduced a specialization in art conservation and restoration.

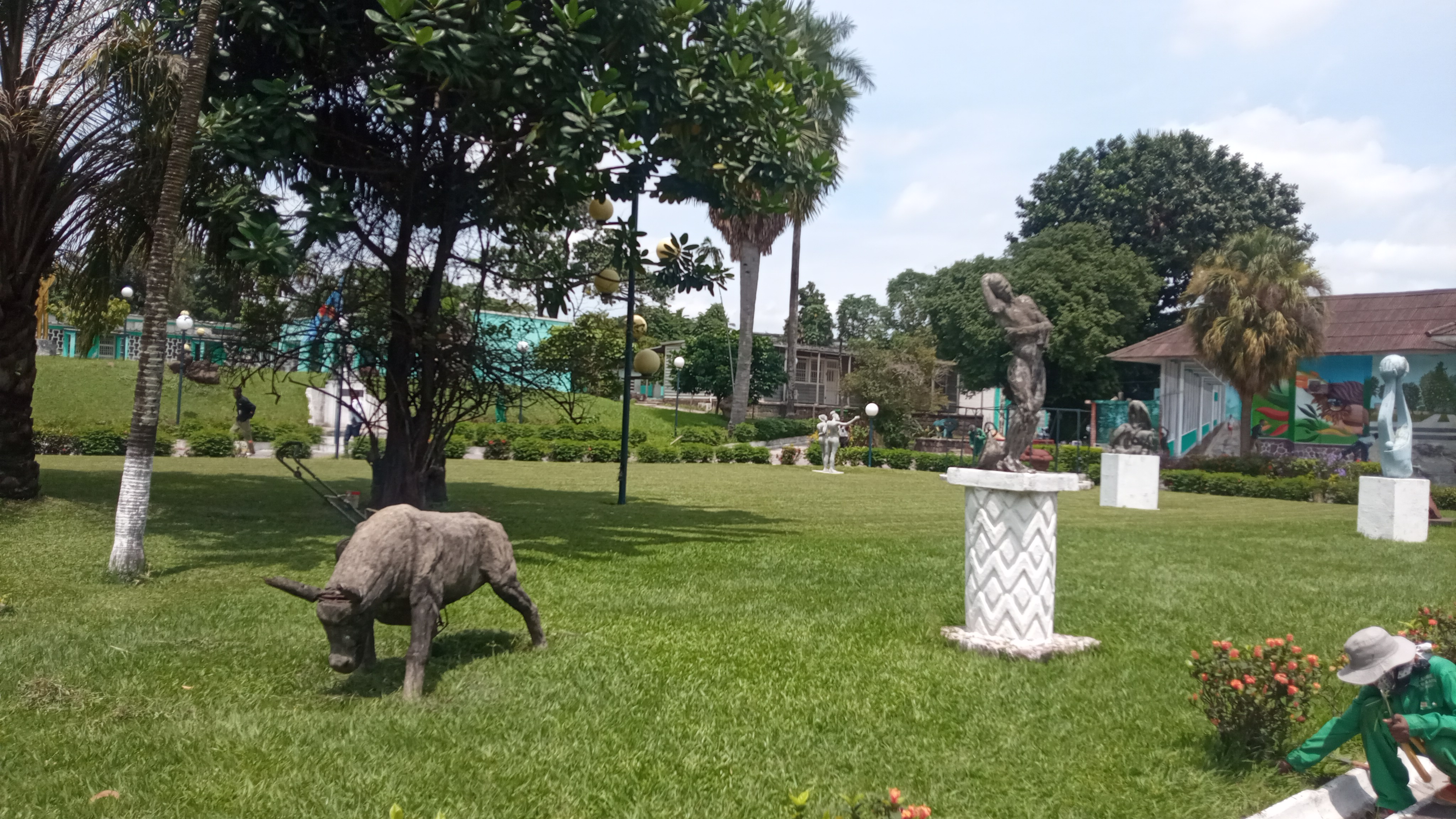
Campus grounds featuring outdoor sculptures.

Although Lufwa's sculptures became prominent public landmarks, he received no royalties from them. He continued sculpting alongside his son Bernard at their workshop in Ngaliema. Although he became a member of the Société Congolaise des Droits d'Auteurs et des Droits Voisins (SOCODA), established in 2011, his efforts to obtain compensation—estimated by him at more than US$1 million—were unsuccessful. In 2019, he appealed to President Félix Tshisekedi to recognize his intellectual property rights. While Lufwa was hospitalized at Clinique Ngaliema in January 2020, journalists noted the contrast between his situation and the government's US$1.3 million investment to rehabilitate the FIKIN complex, where one of his most famous sculptures stood. Lufwa died on 13 January 2020, and the next month the ABA-KIN honored his legacy with a campus memorial ceremony and the installation of his bust outside the sculpture department.

== Academics and administration ==
=== Mission ===
According to its founding mandate, established by Ordinance No. 01-170 of 7 October 1981, the ABA-KIN trains professionals in visual and graphic arts and researches the adaptation and application of new artistic techniques. The academy is a public higher technical institutes (instituts supérieurs techniques). Its mission includes practical and theoretical training, historical and cultural study, research on artistic methods, and the development of creative independence. The academy offers university-level artistic training leading to the graduat and licence degrees. Although the institution admits international students, classes must currently be attended in person in Kinshasa, as distance-learning programs are not yet available.

=== Academic sections ===
==== Visual arts ====
The visual arts section is made up of five departments. The oldest department is sculpture, which was founded in 1943. It teaches students how to create three-dimensional artworks using different materials and methods. Students learn skills such as wood carving, modeling, and casting with plaster, cement, and metal. They also explore modern sculpture styles and experimental art techniques.

The painting department was founded in 1950 and focuses on traditional and modern painting methods. Students study drawing, easel painting, monumental painting, murals, and other modern practices. They experiment with various materials, including paper, canvas, and wood. The program also introduces contemporary forms such as photography, installation art, and text-based artwork.

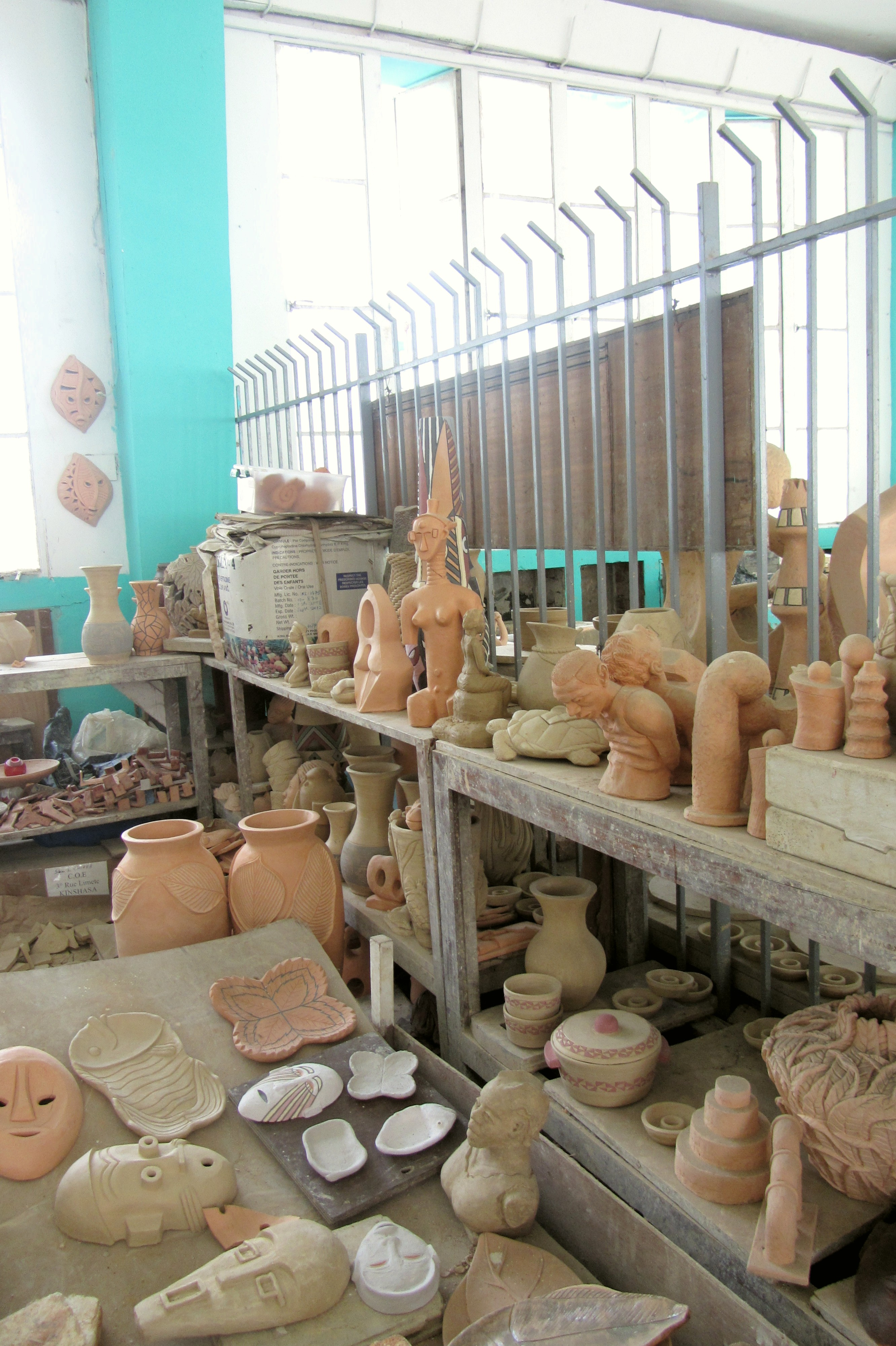
Ceramics at the academy, with student-made terracotta sculptures and pottery.

The ceramics department was created in 1953 and focuses on using clay and other fired materials. Students learn about ceramic history, production methods, pottery skills, hand-building techniques, wheel throwing, terracotta sculpture, and ceramic mosaics.

The metalwork department began in 1971 and trains students to use metal. Students learn repoussé and chasing, as well as cutting, welding, assembling, enameling, and jewelry making.

The art conservation and restoration department was created during the 2012–2013 academic year. Its goal is to prepare specialists who can protect, repair, and study influential artworks and cultural objects. The department helps preserve the country's artistic heritage, including historical works and museum collections. It also offers special training for employees of the Institute of National Museums of Congo. Admission requires applicants to have a graduate diploma in visual arts and complete the entrance examination for the preparatory year (special licentiate program) before enrolling in the department's regular second-cycle curriculum.

==== Graphic arts ====
The graphic arts section includes the visual communication department, which trains students in graphic design, ways of sharing messages, and creative visual expression. Students learn how images, symbols, text styles, and different media can be used to share ideas and represent culture.

The interior architecture department focuses on the design and decoration of indoor spaces.

=== Library ===
The ABA-KIN has a library with a collection of approximately 5,000 books covering art and related fields, including painting, sculpture, ceramics, photography, film, graphic design, design, conservation and restoration of artworks, philosophy, art history, and aesthetics. The library has a computer-equipped reading room. In July 2025, it was expanded and renovated with support from the Chinese Embassy in the DRC, with the work carried out by a Chinese company GREC 7.

=== Governance ===
The governance is organized around the Institute Council, the Management Committee, and decentralized councils at the section and department levels. The Institute Council, chaired by the director general, is the academy's main governing body and includes members of the Management Committee, representatives of academic, scientific, administrative, and technical units, as well as representatives of sections and the student body.

The Management Committee serves as the ABA-KIN's executive body and consists of four members: the director general, the academic secretary general, the administrative secretary general, and the budget administrator. The director general chairs the Management Committee, serves as a member of the Institute Council, and has independent institutional authority. As of 2025, the committee is composed of Henri Kalama Akulez (director general), Benjamin Kuyena Muzita (academic secretary general), Jean-Pierre Nduwa Nawej (administrative secretary general), and Joseph Nzoku Boteni (budget administrator). At the decentralized level, section councils and department councils manage their respective units.

Director general	Tenure
Brother Marc Stanislas Wallenda	1943–1960; 1964–1965
Brother Maxence Evrard	1963–1964
Brother Denis de Schepper	1963–1966
Brother André Lafarge Bembika	1967–1985; 1985–1986
Pululu Kingumba	1986 (3 months)
Liyolo Limbe M'puanga	1986–1990
Kitenda Kia Masiala	1990–1997
Shongo Lohonga Dangi	1997–2012
Missassi Kabwith	2012–2016
Henri Kalama Akulez	2016–present

== Notable alumni ==
- Chéri Chérin
- Gosette Lubondo
- André Lufwa, the first Congolese teacher
