= Achucarro =

Achucarro or Achúcarro is a surname. Notable people with the surname include:

- Ana Achúcarro (born 1962), Spanish astroparticle physicist
- Ignacio Achúcarro (born 1936), Paraguayan footballer
- Joaquín Achúcarro (born 1932), Spanish classical pianist
- Jorge Achucarro (born 1981), Paraguayan footballer

== Other uses ==
- Achucarro Basque Center for Neuroscience
