= Ana Achúcarro =

Astrophysicist and cosmologist

Ana Achúcarro MAE
- Born: Ana Achúcarro Jiménez; 1962 (age 63–64)
- Education: University of the Basque Country (BA); University of Cambridge (PhD)
- Known for: Astroparticle physics Supergravity
- Scientific career
- Institutions: Tufts University; Imperial College London; University of Leiden; Isaac Newton Institute
- Thesis: Classical properties of supersymmetric extended objects (1988)
- Doctoral advisor: Paul Townsend
- Doctoral students: Jonathan Mboyo Esole
- Website: wwwhome.lorentz.leidenuniv.nl/~achucar

Ana Achúcarro Jiménez MAE (born 1962) is a Spanish cosmologist. She is a researcher and professor of particle astrophysics and quantum field theory at the University of Leiden in Leiden, Netherlands. Her research considers the early universe, supergravity, black holes and solitons.

== Early life and education ==
Achúcarro graduated from the University of the Basque Country in Spain, graduating with a B.A. in physics in 1984. She moved to the United Kingdom for her doctoral studies, completing the Part III of the Mathematical Tripos in 1985. She was awarded the St Catharine's College, Cambridge graduate prize in mathematics. She remained in Cambridge, England for her PhD, working with Paul Townsend and Stephen Hawking. She was awarded the J. T. Knight Prize and a British Council Fleming Scholarship. She completed her PhD in 1988, with a thesis titled Classical Properties of Supersymmetric Extended Objects. Achúcarro remains a member of the Isaac Newton Institute for Mathematical Studies, based in Cambridge.

== Research and career ==
Achúcarro joined Imperial College London as a postdoctoral research associate in 1988. A year later, she was appointed assistant professor at Tufts University in the United States where she worked on cosmic strings. Her research there showed that the presence of global symmetries in gauge theory can result in stringlike defects. Achúcarro's research also concerns string theory and the early universe. She moved to the Netherlands in 2002 to join Leiden University. She was awarded a National Science Foundation ADVANCE lectureship at Case Western Reserve University in 2004.

Achúcarro leads the theoretical cosmology group at the University of Leiden, working on astroparticle physics and quantum field theory. She was a pioneer in the application of string theory to cosmology. In 2011 she participated in Science of the Cosmos, an annual lecture series hosted by the BBVA Foundation. The lectures considered the origins of the universe. She was part of the European Cooperation in Science and Technology (COST) public directive on the string theory universe. She also serves on the European Science Foundation's steering committee for Cosmology in the Laboratory.

In 2015, she was awarded a €2.3 million grant from the Netherlands Organisation for Scientific Research (NWO). She was appointed to the Galileo Galilei Institute for Theoretical Physics in 2016. Achúcarro leads the Leiden de Sitter cosmology programme, which trains young scientists in the interdisciplinary area of modern cosmology. She serves on the advisory council of the Spanish National Research Council.

== Awards and honours ==
She was elected a Member of the Academia Europaea (MAE) in 2011.

== See also ==
- List of Spanish inventors and discoverers
