= André Lufwa =

Congolese sculptor (1925–2020)

- Born: 15 November 1925; Bas-Congo, French Equatorial Africa
- Died: 13 January 2020 (aged 94); Kinshasa, Democratic Republic of the Congo
- Occupation: Sculptor

André Lufwa Mawidi (15 November 1925 – 13 January 2020) was a Congolese sculptor. He is best known for his sculpture Batteur de tam-tam, which is on display at the Foire internationale de Kinshasa. Lufwa earned a degree in sculpture from École Saint-Luc in Kinshasa, which is now called Académie des Beaux-Arts.
