= List of museums in the Democratic Republic of the Congo =

This is a list of museums in the Democratic Republic of the Congo.

== Museums in the Democratic Republic of the Congo ==
- National Museum of the Democratic Republic of Congo (Kinshasa)
- National Museum of Lubumbashi
- Butembo Museum
- Kananga Museum
- Kisangani Museum
- Kivu Museum in Catholic Mission of Xaverian Fathers, Bukavu
- Lubumbashi Museum
- Mbandaka Museum
- Mushenge Museum

== Defunct museums ==
- Museum of Native Life (Musée de la vie indigène), founded in 1936 at Léopoldville (modern-day Kinshasa)

== See also ==
- List of museums
