= National Museum of Lubumbashi =

Museum in Lubumbashi, DRC

Coordinates: 11°38′59″S 27°28′37″E

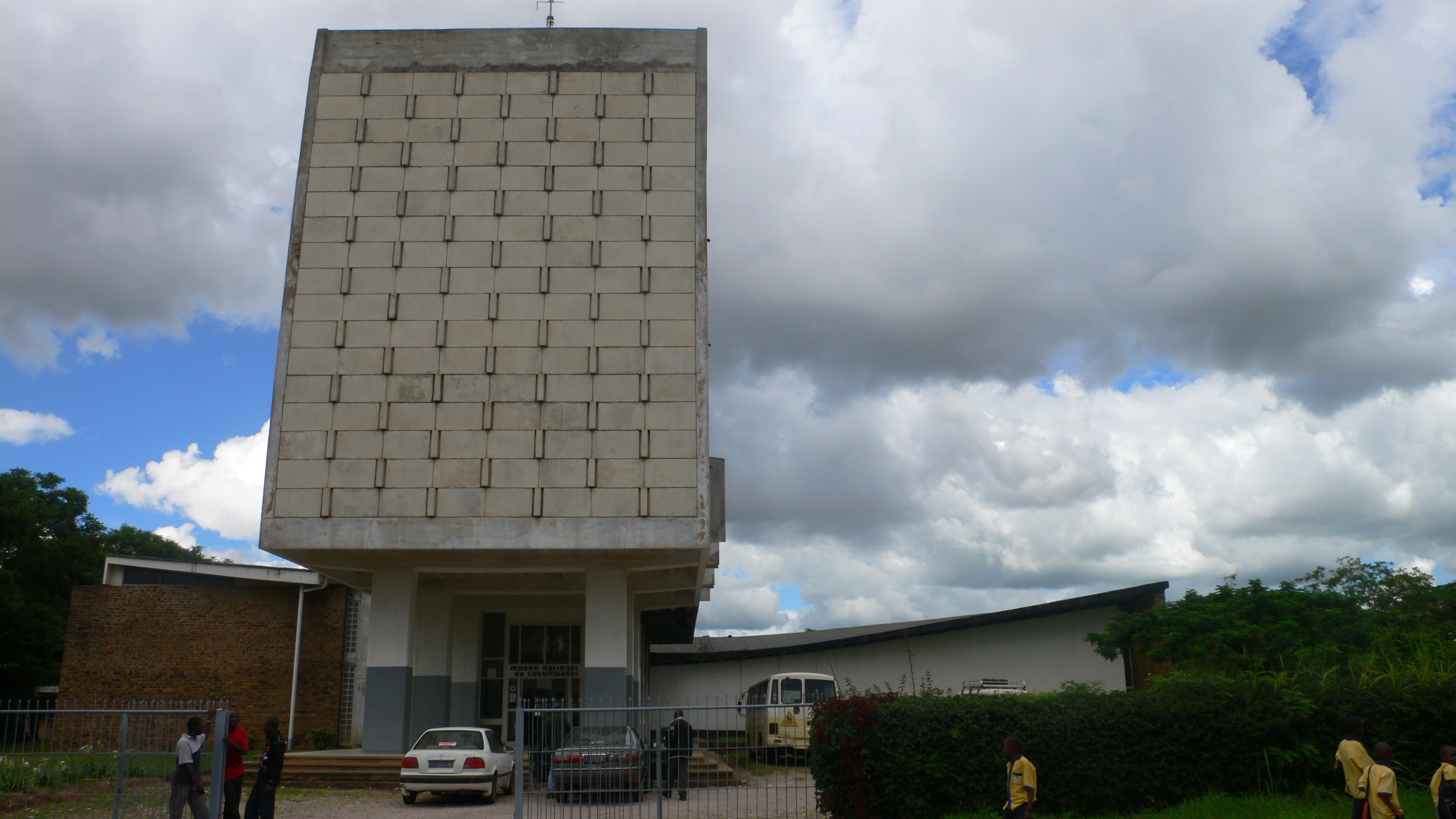
Museum building, opened 2000

The National Museum of Lubumbashi (French: Musée national de Lubumbashi) is a museum with core collections in archaeology and ethnography in Lubumbashi, Haut-Katanga Province in the Democratic Republic of the Congo. It was founded in 1946.

== See also ==
- Institute of National Museums of Congo
- National Museum of the Democratic Republic of the Congo (Kinshasa)
- List of museums in the Democratic Republic of the Congo
