= Jonathan Mboyo Esole =

Congolese mathematician (born 1977)

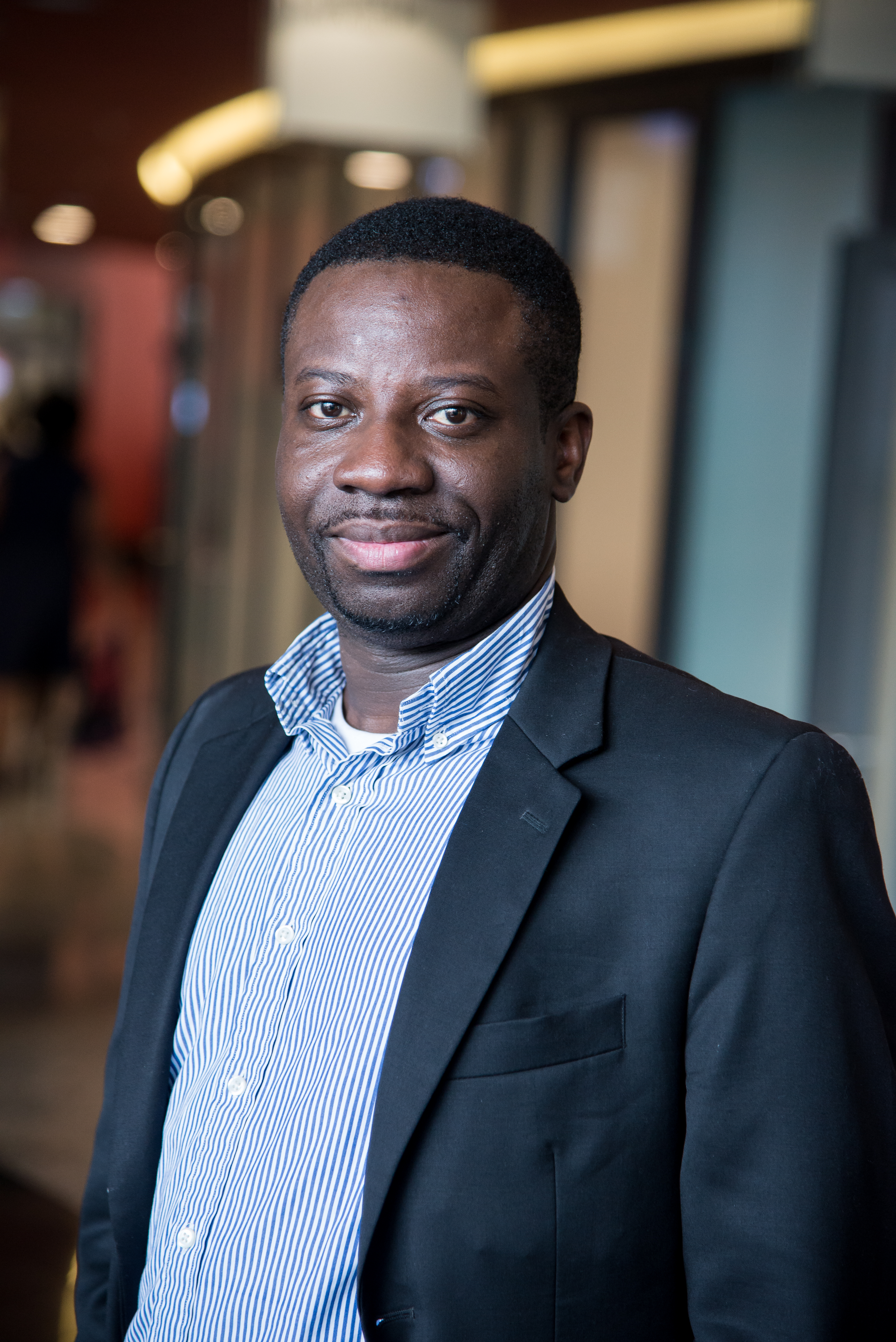
- Esole in 2018
- Born: 24 February 1977 (age 49)
- Education: Free University of Brussels; University of Cambridge; Leiden University
- Children: 3
- Scientific career
- Workplaces: Northeastern University; Harvard University
- Doctoral advisor: Ana Achúcarro
- Website: northeastern.edu/esole

Jonathan Mboyo Esole (born February 24, 1977) is an associate professor of mathematics at Northeastern University. He works on the geometry of string theory.

== Early life and career ==
Esole was born in Kinshasa and attended Boboto College. He moved to Belgium at the age of three and did not return to the Congo for six years. He studied at the Free University of Brussels, the same university his father had attended. In his thesis, Unicité de la supergravité D=4 N=1 par les méthodes BRST, he demonstrated the uniqueness of N=1 supergravity in four spacetime dimensions with minimal assumptions using homological methods. This was a major result in the field as it showed that under mild assumptions that if a free graviton is coupled to a particle of spin 3/2, the only consistent theory will have supersymmetry..

He graduated Summa cum laude in 2001, and won the prize for the best thesis. He joined the University of Cambridge for his doctoral studies to study Part III of the Mathematical Tripos, working under director of studies Fernando Quevedo. He moved to Leiden University for his PhD, working with Ana Achúcarro on cosmic strings. His thesis considered Fayet-Iliopoulos terms and BPS cosmic strings in N = 2 supergravity. He served as a visiting fellow at Stanford University, working with Renata Kallosh. He joined KU Leuven as a Marie Curie Fellow, working with Antoine Van Proeyen and Frederic Denef on string theory and supergravity. He spoke at the Marie Curie Fellow Training Workshop.

== Career ==
Esole works on F-theory, a branch of string theory at the interface with mathematics. He joined the Department of Physics at Harvard University as a postdoctoral research fellow in 2008. He moved to the Department of Mathematics in 2013, and was appointed Benjamin Peirce Fellow working with the Fields Medal winner Shing-Tung Yau. He worked on SU(5) models and opened the door to the systematic use of crepant resolutions of singularities in F-theory. He also studied D-brane deconstructions in IIB Orientifolds. He delivered a keynote at the Conference for African American Research in Mathematical Sciences. He was a member of the Center for the Fundamental Law of Nature. Esole was appointed as an assistant professor at Northeastern University in 2016. He was awarded a National Science Foundation grant to work on Elliptic Fibrations and String Theory in 2014. This allowed him to investigate F-theory and elliptic fibrations.

In 2017 Esole was named a NextEinstein Forum Fellow. This award celebrates the best young African scientists. He is interested in African education and supports the Lumumba Lab. He is part of the Malaika school, an initiative to teach girls in Kalebuka.

In 2022, Esole was listed as one of the ten members of the newly created African Advisory Board of the French National Center for Scientific Research (CNRS). Antoine Petit, the General Director of CNRS described the need for this new advisory board as follows: "Scientific cooperation between Africa and Europe is a priority for the CNRS: we want to set up lasting partnerships of excellence to meet the challenges of today and tomorrow. To achieve this, we have surrounded ourselves with personalities with whom we can take the right measure of the field, who will help us question our practices and usefully mobilize our forces".

In July 2022, Esole became a nonresident senior fellow of Atlantic Council's Africa Center, directed by Ambassador Rama Yade. The Africa Center was established in September 2009 to help transform U.S. and European policy approaches to Africa by emphasizing the building of strong geopolitical partnerships with African states and strengthening economic growth and prosperity on the continent.

After the 2021 eruption of Mount Nyiragongo, a volcano near the city of Goma, he created the Linda Project, a platform for African scientists, technologists, and entrepreneurs that provides training and equipment and advocates for open-science research and for African countries to own and control their data and scientific equipment. In May 2022, the Linda Project helped establish the first Congolese-owned seismic network monitoring the volcanos of Mount Nyiragongo and Mount Nyamulagira. Esole personally designed the telemetry of the network.

== Awards and honours ==
- 2022 Member of the African Advisory Board of CNRS
- 2018 International Dunia Award
- 2017 NextEinstein Forum Fellow
- 2013 Harvard University Benjamin Peirce Fellow
- 2006 European Commission Maire Curie Fellow
- 2001 University of Cambridge Philippe Wiener-Maurice Anspach Foundation Grant
- 2001 Free University of Brussels Board of Honour
- 2001 Free University of Brussels A.Sc.Br Prize, Best Thesis in the Faculty of Sciences
- 1997 Association of Congolese Journalists for Progress, Prix d’ Excellence
- 1997 Baccalaureate of the Republic of Zaire, Vice Laureate
