= National Museum of the Democratic Republic of the Congo =

History museum in Kinshasa, Democratic Republic of the Congo

- Musée national de la République démocratique du Congo
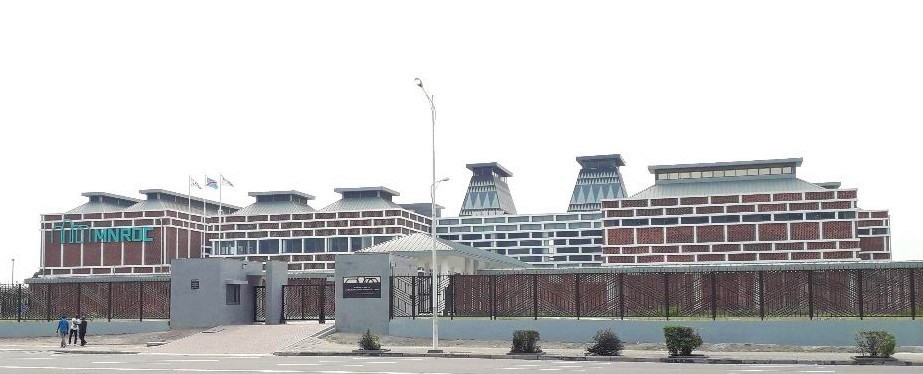
- 2019 street view
- Location on map of central Kinshasa
- Established: 23 November 2019
- Location: Kinshasa, DR Congo
- Coordinates: 4.3351°S 15.2994°E
- Type: Ethnography and History museum
- Director: Henry Bondjoko
- Architect: Junglim Architecture
- Website: Facebook page in French

The National Museum of the Democratic Republic of the Congo (French: Musée national de la République démocratique du Congo, or MNRDC) is a museum for the cultural history of the numerous ethnic groups and historical epochs of the Democratic Republic of the Congo in the capital Kinshasa. It was officially handed over to the Congolese government by representatives of South Korea in June 2019.

The construction cost of $21 million USD was funded by the Korea International Cooperation Agency (KOICA). The building was built after a construction period of 33 months in cooperation between experts from the Congo and South Korea under modern aspects (locally available construction materials, use of solar energy, natural air circulation with only partial use of air conditioning, etc.) and represents the largest South Korean cultural policy investment in Central Africa to date.

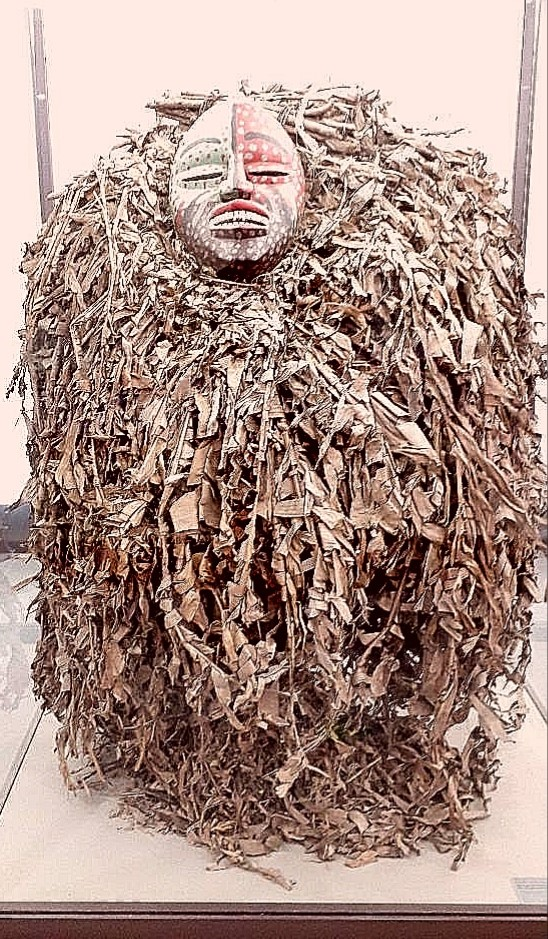
Costume of a masked dancer at the National Museum of the DR Congo

In three public exhibition halls of 6,000 m^{2}, 12,000 objects can be presented in their cultural context. The majority of the holdings of the Institute of National Museums of Congo (Institut des Musées Nationaux du Congo), however, must be stored in depots. Unlike in the past, when the director and scientific cooperation had been provided for decades by Belgian scientists from the Africa Museum in Brussels, Congolese experts have now been trained in South Korea. Thus, the Congolese cultural politicians have put their international cooperation on a broader basis than before.

The museum was opened to the public on 23 November 2019 by the President of the DR Congo, Félix Tshisekedi. Referring to recent requests for the repatriation of African cultural heritage from museums in Europe, Tshisekedi said: "We support the return of the scattered cultural heritage, especially in Belgium. The idea is there, but it needs to be done gradually. Of course it is a Congolese heritage, one day it will be necessary that this heritage is returned, but it has to be done in an organized way. It requires means for the upkeep. One thing is to ask for their return, but another is to conserve it."

== See also ==
- Culture of the Democratic Republic of the Congo
- National Museum of Lubumbashi
- List of museums in the Democratic Republic of the Congo
