= Gosette Lubondo =

Congolese photographer

- Born: January 1, 1993 (age 33); Kinshasa
- Occupation: Photographer

Gosette Lubondo (born 1993) is a Congolese photographer who works on personal projects. Her work includes the series Imaginary Trip, which is held in the collection of the Musée du Quai Branly – Jacques Chirac in Paris. Gosette Lubondo was born in Kinshasa.

== Career ==
Lubondo studied communication and visual arts at the Académie des Beaux-Arts in Kinshasa, Democratic Republic of the Congo.

Her Imaginary Trip series, first produced in 2016, "involves using abandoned areas left to nature to produce scenes and reconstructions. The purpose of these photographs is not just to keep the memory of these places alive, but to shed new light on their past and explore their meaning in today's societal context." In 2018, she used a residence at the Musée du Quai Branly – Jacques Chirac in Paris to work on Imaginary Trip II.

== Publications ==
- Au fil du temps; Imaginary Trip; Imaginary Trip II; Tala Ngai. Montreuil, France: l'Oeil, 2020. ISBN 9782351372968. French and English. Published on the occasion of an exhibition.

== Collections ==
Lubondo's work is held in the following permanent collection:

- Musée du Quai Branly – Jacques Chirac, Paris: Imaginary Trip II
- KANAL - Centre Pompidou, Brussels: Terre de lait, terre de miel
