= Sinzo Aanza =

Congolese writer (1990)

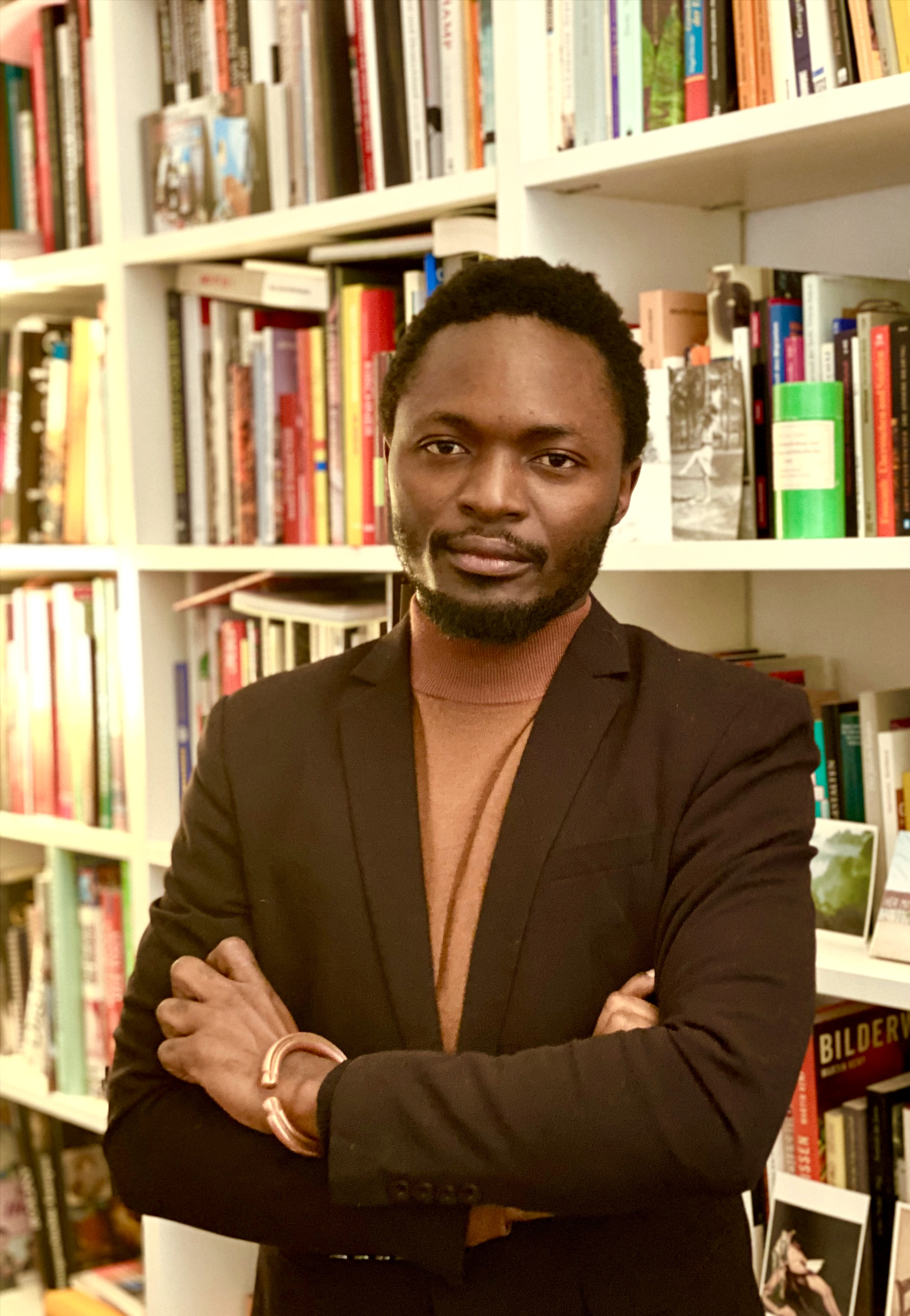
- Sinzo Aanza in 2021
- Born: 1990 (age 35–36); Goma, Democratic Republic of the Congo
- Known for: Literature, theatre, photography, installation, performance

Sinzo Aanza (born 1990 in Goma) is a Congolese writer, playwright and visual artist whose practice encompasses literature, theatre, photography, installation and performance.

His work explores fiction, the construction of narratives, their competition and their impact on reality, as well as memory and forms of representation. The Democratic Republic of the Congo constitutes a recurring historical, political and imaginary context in his work.

== Biography ==
Sinzo Aanza grew up between Goma and Butembo, in North Kivu, during the years of war that affected the region. This context of destruction and the destabilization of populations and territories shaped his relationship with artistic creation and later became a significant aspect of his work.

Aanza published his first novel, Généalogie d'une banalité, with Vents d'ailleurs in 2015.

The novel takes the collapse of a mine in a working-class neighbourhood of Lubumbashi as one of its starting points. It develops a polyphonic structure in which different forms of memory and representations of social reality confront one another.

Critical responses to the novel have focused on the relationships between memory and history, imaginaries associated with the mining economy, and the use and transformation of political, social and media discourses.

== Work ==
=== Theatre ===
Aanza's dramatic writing addresses relationships between language, power, violence and institutions.

Que ta volonté soit Kin, directed by Aristide Tarnagda, was created on 26 October 2018 during the 10th edition of the Récréâtrales festival in Ouagadougou. The production was subsequently presented at venues including the Odéon-Théâtre de l'Europe in Paris.

Le Jour du massacre was presented at Les Praticables in Bamako in a production directed by Aristide Tarnagda. It was later presented in Kinshasa as part of the Ça se passe à Kin festival, directed by Philip Boulay.

Histoire générale des murs, directed by Philip Boulay, was presented in Kinshasa as part of the Ça se passe à Kin festival.

Plaidoirie pour vendre le Congo, directed by Aristide Tarnagda, premiered at the Récréâtrales festival in Ouagadougou in 2020. It was subsequently presented at venues including Théâtre Jean-Vilar in Vitry-sur-Seine and the Comédie de Reims.

The play centres on a council charged with determining financial compensation for the families of people killed by the army. The monetary valuation of human life constitutes one of the central devices of the drama.

La Nature de la loi, commissioned by the africologne festival, was presented in Cologne in 2021.

=== Visual art ===
From the second half of the 2010s, Aanza developed a visual art practice combining photography, installation, performance, text and artistic research.

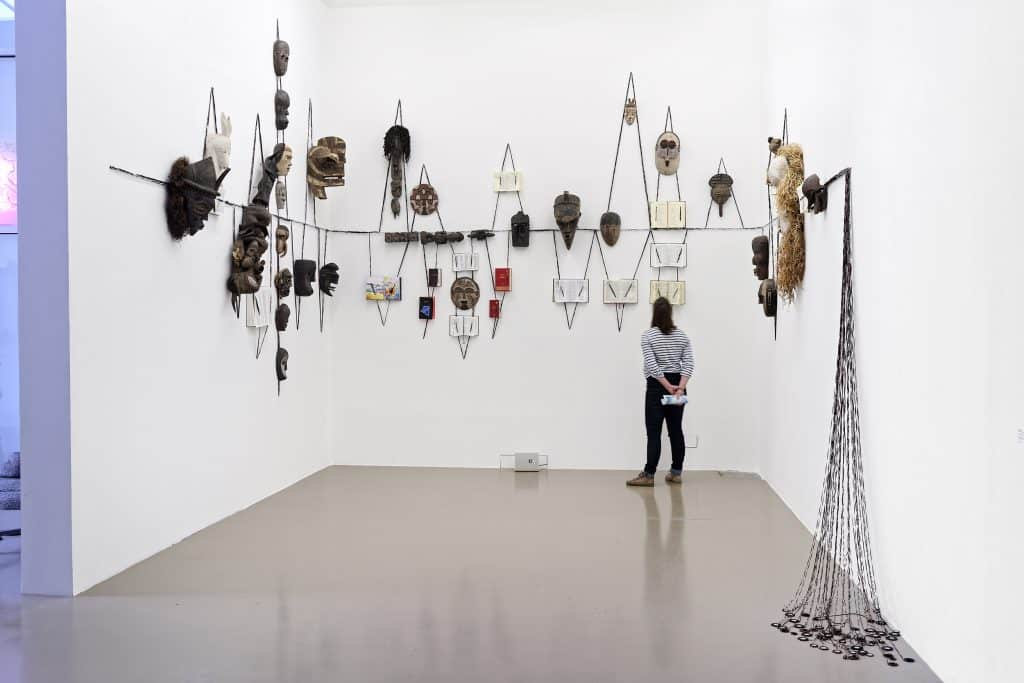
Sinzo Aanza, Projet d’attentat contre l’image, 2017

In 2017, he was an artist-in-residence at WIELS in Brussels, where he worked on Projet d'attentat contre l'image ?.

His exhibited projects include Épreuve d'allégorie, presented at the Rencontres d'Arles in 2018; Pertinences citoyennes, presented at Galerie Imane Farès in Paris and WIELS in Brussels; The Lord is dead, long life to the Lord, presented at the Museum Rietberg in Zurich and the MuCAT in Abidjan; The Improbable Memorial, presented at Galerie Imane Farès and Kunsthaus Zürich; The Uninterrupted Song for the City, presented at the Free Flow Festival and Museum Rietberg in Zurich; La cohue des petites utopies, presented at the Musée national de la République démocratique du Congo in Kinshasa and at ACUD MACHT NEU in Berlin; and The Irregular Line, presented at the 36th Ljubljana Biennale of Graphic Arts, in 2025.

His installations frequently combine images, objects, texts and documents. His work creates tensions between document and fiction, memory and speculation, and historical and possible narratives.

The Lord is dead, long life to the Lord was presented in connection with the exhibition Fiktion Kongo at the Museum Rietberg in Zurich. The project explores the history of European collections of African objects, their imagery and the narratives associated with them, as they have contributed to shaping identity assignments. It uses the art market as a site for constructing narratives through materials related to the research of art dealer and ethnologist Hans Himmelheber.

== Artistic practice ==
The movement between literature, theatre and visual art is a characteristic feature of Aanza's practice. Related concerns circulate across writing, performance, images and installation.

Fiction occupies a central position in his work. It functions as a way of questioning reality and producing narratives, images and possible situations.

Memory, archives, history and collective narratives recur throughout his projects. The Congolese context supplies historical, political and social material for his work. His practice also addresses questions concerning images, the construction of narratives and political forms of the imaginary.

== Critical reception ==
Aanza's work has been examined in scholarship on contemporary African and Francophone literature, postcolonial studies and ecocriticism.

A significant part of this research has focused on Généalogie d'une banalité. Studies of the novel have addressed its polyphonic structure, the relationship between individual and collective memory, overlapping historical temporalities and the confrontation of political, economic and social discourses.

Other studies have examined the novel through questions of vulnerability and social hierarchy, focusing on the relationship between individual and collective experience and on the rhetorical strategies used to represent marginalized urban communities.

The novel's critical function has also been examined within the context of contemporary Francophone Congolese literature, particularly in relation to fiction, social transformations and discourses of power.

Other studies have approached the novel through the persistence of colonial history and its inscription in urban spaces and contemporary imaginaries.

Ecocritical approaches have highlighted extractivism, the subsoil and relationships to place. Mineral extraction has been examined as a process transforming spaces, living conditions and imaginaries.

Research has also examined relationships between extractivism, urban space and writing, as well as the possibilities of recomposition opened by fiction.

Critical work has also addressed the movement of Aanza's writing beyond a strictly literary space and its circulation between text, theatre, performance and visual art.

== Awards and recognition ==
- 2024 – Selected for the Future Generation Art Prize.
- 2025 – Audience Award at the 36th Ljubljana Biennale of Graphic Arts for The Irregular Line.
- 2026 – Plaidoirie pour vendre le Congo selected for the 2027 edition of the Prix Sony Labou Tansi.

== Publications ==
- Généalogie d'une banalité. Vents d'ailleurs, 2015.
- Que ta volonté soit Kin. Éditions Nzoi / Éditions Passages, 2018.
- Plaidoirie pour vendre le Congo. Éditions Nzoi, 2023.
- “La rivière sans fin”, in Or, exhibition catalogue, Mucem / Éditions Hazan, 2018.
- “We saw you on TV”, The Chimurenga Chronic, Cape Town, 2019.
- “Jour de malédiction”, in Dominique Malaquais (ed.), Kinshasa Chroniques / Kinshasa Chronicles, Éditions de l'Œil, 2019.
- “Le capital de l'imaginaire. Ce qu'il y a et ce qui n'est pas”, Multitudes, no. 81, 2020/4, in the section Kinshasa Star Line.
- “Sinzo Aanza's Poetic Prose”, Versopolis, Festival of Hope, 29 April 2020.
- Contributor to Timescapes – aller-retour: Erzählungen aus afrikanischen Kontexten, C. W. Leske Verlag, Düsseldorf, 2022; the trilingual anthology includes two short stories by Aanza.
- Contributor to Recaptioning Congo: African Stories and Colonial Pictures, edited by Sandrine Colard, Lannoo Publishers, 2022.
- Plädoyer für den Verkauf des Kongo, German translation of Plaidoirie pour vendre le Congo by Francesca Spinazzi, in SPUREN – Zeitgenössische Theatertexte aus afrikanischen Ländern und der afrikanischen Diaspora, Theater der Zeit, Berlin, 2025.
