= Joseph-Aurélien Cornet =

Brother Joseph-Aurélien Cornet F.S.C.

Orders
- Ordination: 1938

Personal details
- Born: May 20, 1919 Graide, Bièvre, Belgium
- Died: January 20, 2004 (aged 84) Ciney, Belgium
- Denomination: Roman Catholic, Latin Church
- Residence: Democratic Republic of the Congo
- Occupation: Institute of the Brothers of the Christian Schools, art and architectural historian
- Education: Université catholique de Louvain

Joseph-Aurélien Cornet FSC (born 20 May 1919 in Bièvre, died 20 January 2004 in Ciney, Belgium) was a Belgian-born Christian Brother, ethnologist and art historian who documented the art and culture of the Congolese region and people of the Congo in photographs, illustrated field notebooks, and language primers for nearly 30 years.

== Education and career ==
Cornet was educated by the Christian Brothers of Louvain. He entered the novitiate in 1935, earned a teaching degree in 1938, followed by bachelor's, master's, and doctoral degrees in art history from the Catholic University of Louvain in 1945 and 1970, respectively.

In 1970, Cornet also became the first local director of the Institut des Musées Nationaux du Congo (IMNC) and then, in 1971, director of the Institut des Musées Nationaux du Zaïre (IMNZ). The IMNC was founded without either a building or any objects, so Cornet's primary task was to develop the museum's collections. He did so primarily among the Woyo, the Kuba, and the Nkundu peoples. He documented his findings in field notebooks and binders of photo negatives with the aim of eventually developing a ten volume History of Congolese Art.

Cornet retired from the directorship of the IMNC in 1987 and returned to Belgium in 1992 where he continued researching, publishing and lecturing, especially on tracking looted objects from the museum following the 1997 collapse of the Mobutu regime.

Following his death in 2004, Cornet's archive of photographic negative binders, field notebooks, language and personal notes, printed materials, and other research objects were donated to the Loyola University New Orleans Special Collections & Archives.

== Bibliography ==
- Joseph-Aurélien Cornet. Art Du Zaïre: 100 Chefs-d'oeuvre de la Collection Nationale. African-American Institute, 1975 - Art, Congolese (Democratic Republic) - 132 pages
- Joseph-Aurélien Cornet, Victor Bol. Moseka Yogo Ambake. Hamburgisches Museum für Völkerkunde, 1994 - 23 pages
- Joseph Aurélien Cornet. Zaïre: volken, kunst, kultuur. Mercatorfonds, 1989 - Art, Congolese (Democratic Republic) - 407 pages
- Joseph-Aurélien Cornet, Musée de Louvain-la-Neuve, Nicole Ledent, Anne Massaux, Christine Thiry, Bernard Van den Driessche, Ignace Vandevivere. Collections africaines: Florilège. Musée de Louvain-la-Neuve, 2000 - Art - 110 pages.
