= Paul Lomami-Tshibamba =

Congolese writer (1914–1985)

- Born: 17 July 1914; Brazzaville, French Congo, French Equatorial Africa (modern-day Republic of the Congo)
- Died: 12 August 1985 (aged 71); Brussels, Belgium
- Occupations: Journalist, novelist
- Writing career
- Language: French
- Notable work: Ngando

Paul Lomami-Tshibamba (17 July 1914 – 1985) was a Congolese journalist and author, acclaimed as "the first giant of Congolese literature".

== Life and career ==
Paul Lomami-Tshibamba was born on 17 July 1914 in Brazzaville, French Congo to father from Kasaï-Occidental and a Ngbandi mother from Ubangi, Belgian Congo. In 1921 he moved to Léopoldville, Belgian Congo to join his father.

He studied at the Minor Seminary of Mbata-Kiela, in the Mayumbe in Bas-Congo. Although the school was run by Belgian missionaries who encouraged their pupils to join the priesthood, he did not become a priest. Five years after leaving school he was struck by deafness, an illness from which he never fully recovered despite the good medical care that he received.

Lomami-Tshibamba found employment in the Belgian administration. He helped to establish the Congolese monthly La Voix du Congolaise. He first garnered public attention in 1945 when he published an article in the March/April edition of the paper (its second) entitled, "Quelle sera notre place dans le monde de demain?" It discussed controversial issues surrounding the social status of évolués and press freedoms in the Congo. Comparing the Belgian Congo to the French Congo and other African colonies, he argued that the colonial administration was not adequately preparing to grant the Congo independence while similar efforts were underway in the other territories. The Belgian district commissioner was convinced that Lomami-Tshibamba had written the article with the help of a European accomplice, and had him interrogated and whipped by the police over a three-week period. This stopped after Lomami-Tshibamba informed his superiors in the administration and the governor general intervened on his behalf. He later sought refuge in the French Congo to avoid criminal prosecution.

In 1948 Lomami-Tshibamba was awarded in Brussels the first prize at the "Foire coloniale" (Colonial Fair) for his novella Ngando (Crocodile). The work, which in many ways marks the beginning of Congolese national literature in French, depicts traditional beliefs during the colonial period in a story set on the banks of the Congo River. Its themes of alienation and cultural conflict are further developed in his subsequent works. Lomami-Tshibamba returned to Congo-Zaire after independence and held several government posts. In 1962 he started a newspaper, Le Progrès (Progress), later known as Salongo.

He published further stories and novellas.

== Bibliography ==
- Ngando (1948)
- La Récompense de la cruauté (1972)
- ‘Faire médicament’ (1974)
- ‘Légende de Londema, suzeraine de Mitsoué-ba-Ngomi’ (1974)
- Ngemena (1981)
