= Boboto College =

Location
- 7 Avenue Père Boka, Gombe; DR Congo
- Coordinates: 4°18′32″S 15°17′6″E

Information
- Former name: Albert I College
- Type: Private primary and secondary school
- Motto: Fidele Seray
- Religious affiliation: Roman Catholic (Jesuit)
- Established: 4 October 1937; 88 years ago
- Founder: Society of Jesus
- Rector: Pr Tika Dieudonné, SJ
- Director: Pr Lievin Sj
- Enrollment: c. 2,500
- Website: collegeboboto.net
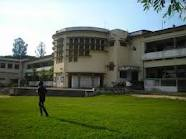

Boboto College (formerly Albert I College) is a private Catholic school run by the Society of Jesus in the Democratic Republic of Congo. It was founded by the Belgian Jesuits in 1937.

== History ==
The Governor General of the Belgian Congo appealed to the Jesuits to instruct and educate the increasing number of young Europeans in Léopoldville. On 4 October 1937 the college opened its doors under the name St. Albert College, to honor St. Albert of Louvain, patron saint of the Belgian monarch Albert I. It was located on premises lent by the Sisters of the Sacred Heart. Two Jesuit priests and a scholastic along with a layman handled the first three classes as well as school and extracurricular activities. The school calendar, class schedule, and the number of course hours followed the Belgian directives. The curriculum was deliberately styled after that of the Jesuit St John Berchmans College, Brussels.

In 1940, the college had to accommodate all European children without religious distinction, since they had become stranded in Africa by the Second World War. The college modified its name to Albert I College, after the King. The official opening of the college was on 3 October 1940, in the presence of civil and ecclesiastical authorities. In 1941 the Jesuit Curia in Rome authorized and financed the erection of several buildings.

In 1945 the Marist Brothers ended their assistance with the primary division of the school. There were then 123 elementary and 93 secondary students. At independence there were 515 elementary students, 227 in Greco-Latin, 151 in Modern Science, 77 in Latin 6th, 49 in Latin 5th, and 20 in Rhetoric. These statistics would increase year by year to an average of 2,400 students – 1,750 primary and 650 secondary – by 1975.

At the introduction of the ideology of African authenticity in the country, Albert I College became Boboto College. The year 1954 opened a new phase in the history of the College with its enrollment of the first six Congolese students.

== Boboto Cultural Center ==
The Boboto Cultural Center (CCB) (Centre Culturel Boboto (French)) was founded in 1942 to contribute to the development of artistic creativity and to the preservation of the Congolese cultural heritage.

== Notable alumni ==
- Felix Tshisekedi – current President of the Democratic Republic of the Congo (2019–Present)
- Jean-Pierre Bemba – former Vice President of the DRC (2003–2006)
- Jonathan Mboyo Esole – associate professor of mathematics at Northeastern University
- Jossart N'Yoka Longo – singer, songwriter, dancer, and producer
- Malage de Lugendo – recording artist, composer, and vocalist
- Dikembe Mutombo – professional basketball player, played 18 seasons in the National Basketball Association (NBA), commonly regarded as one of the greatest shot blockers and defensive players of all time. Outside basketball, he has become well known for his humanitarian work

== See also ==
- Catholic Church in the Democratic Republic of the Congo
- Education in the Democratic Republic of the Congo
- List of Jesuit schools
