= Institute of National Museums of Congo =

Heritage management agency of the Democratic Republic of the Congo

- French: Institut des Musées Nationaux du Congo

Agency overview
- Formed: 11 March 1970; 56 years ago
- Jurisdiction: Ministry of Portfolio and the Ministry of Culture and Arts
- Headquarters: Avenue De La Montagne N°1, Ngaliema, Kinshasa, Democratic Republic of the Congo
- Agency executive: General Director, Jean-Pierre Bokole Ompoka
- Website: https://imnc.online/blog/

The Institute of National Museums of Congo (French: Institut des Musées Nationaux du Congo), colloquially referred to by its acronym IMNC, is a state-run cultural and heritage management agency charged with overseeing the preservation, exhibition, and promotion of the Democratic Republic of the Congo's national museums.

== Profile ==
=== Location ===
Strategically located within the Mont-Ngaliema Presidential Park in the Ngaliema commune on Avenue De La Montagne N°1, opposite the Groupe CHANIC shipyard, northwest of Kinshasa, IMNC's headquarters is adjacent to the Chief of Staff and the Minister of Defence and Veterans. Historically, this site was the residence of the famed Teke-Humbu customary chief, Ngaliema, who built his dwelling and regularly met Chief Makoko on the opposite side of the Pool Malebo. The location also accommodated Henry Morton Stanley's boat before transforming into Mont Ngaliema and subsequently served as the residence for the inaugural Belgian Congo government and the first two Congolese presidents, Joseph Kasa-Vubu (from 1960 to 1965) and Mobutu Sese Seko (from 1965 until the passing of his first wife, Marie-Antoinette Mobutu, in 1977). The vantage point offers a view of the Congo River and Brazzaville.

=== Legal status ===
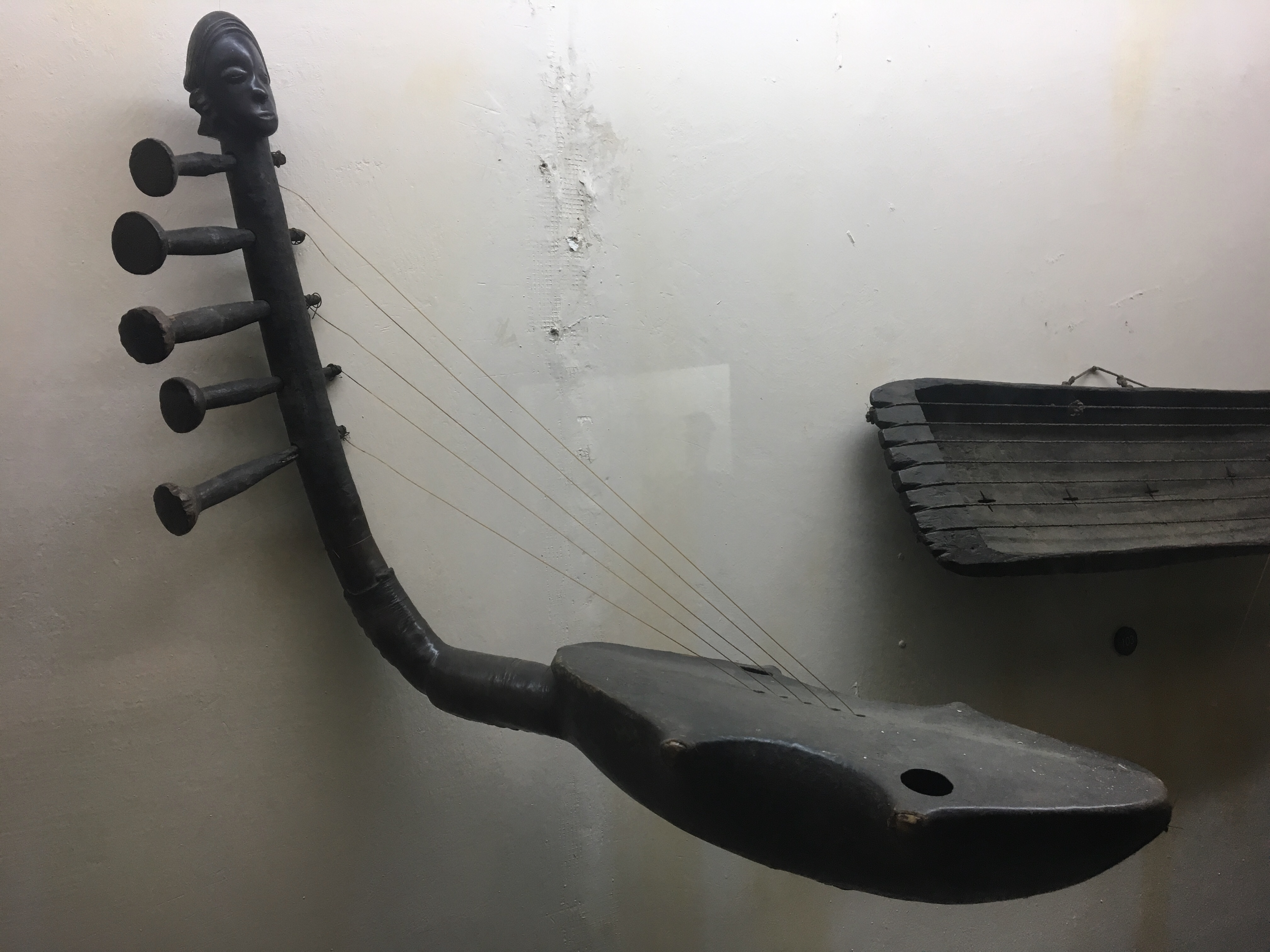
Zande harp at Institute of National Museums of Congo

The Institute of National Museums of Congo is a public enterprise endowed with administrative and financial autonomy, initially established by Presidential Decree No. 70–089 on 11 March 1970. It operates under the joint supervision of the Ministry of Portfolio and the Ministry of Culture and Arts, which oversee financial management and provide technical guidance, respectively. Its legal status, however, has undergone several revisions; for instance, in 1987, Ordinance-Law No. 87-128 transformed the IMNC into a public corporation and delineated key executive roles, such as the President-Delegate General, Deputy President-Delegate General, and members of the Board of Directors. This structure was modified with the emergence of the Alliance of Democratic Forces for the Liberation of Congo-Zaire (AFDL) in 1997, resulting in the suspension of the board of directors and its replacement with a Provisional Management Committee. To address the necessity for rejuvenation and adhere to principles of good governance, a new interim committee was established by Order No. 25/CAB/MCA/MIN/090/BS/2004 on 22 May 2004. The IMNC has a close partnership with the Royal Museum for Central Africa in Tervuren, Belgium, under a special cooperative arrangement that offers logistical support and specialized training to the institute's executives.

=== Mission ===
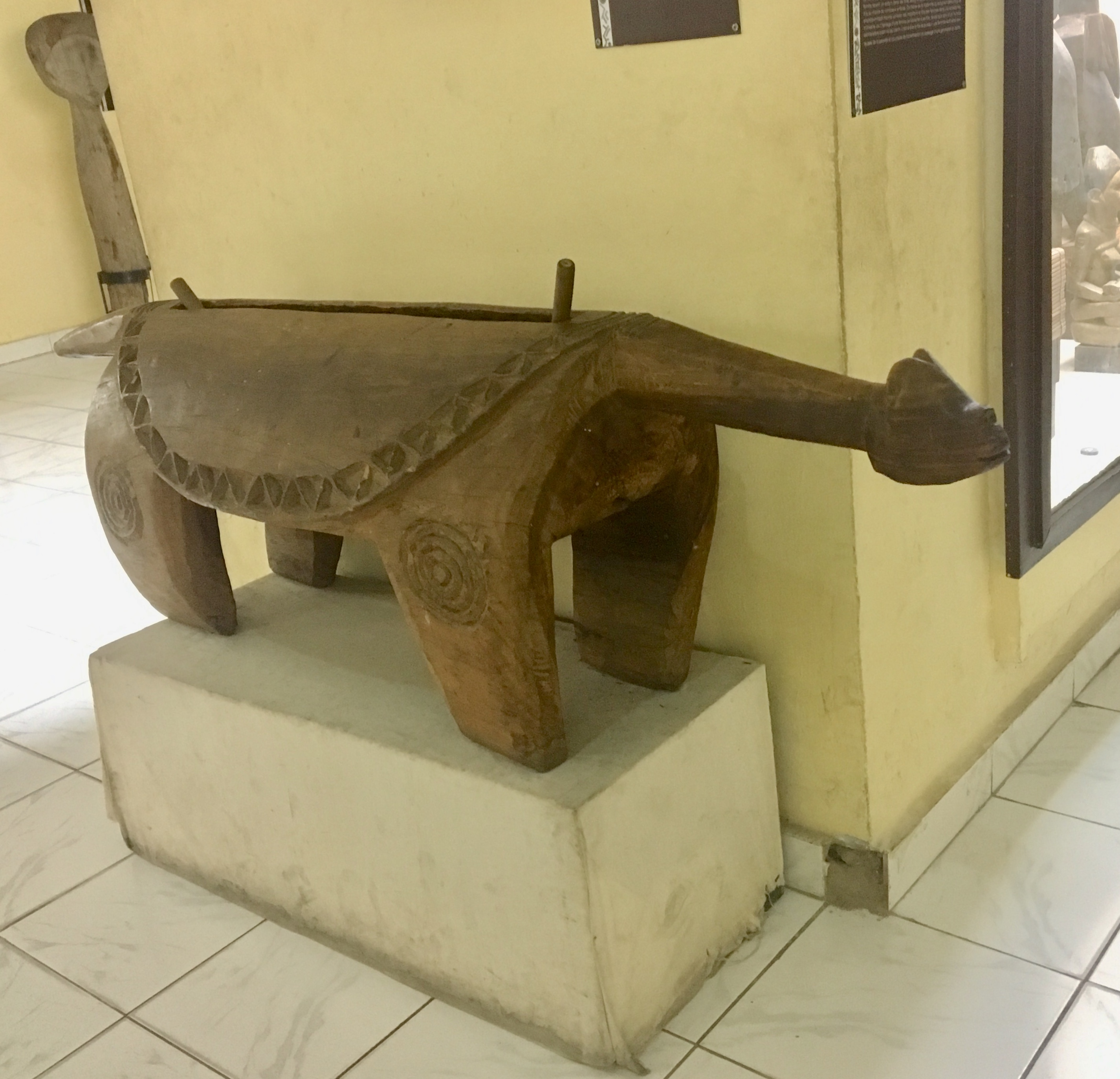
Lokolé drum at IMNC

The IMNC is entrusted with various missions focused on conserving and promoting the rich cultural heritage of the Democratic Republic of the Congo:

- Ensuring the conservation of artworks, monuments, historical and archaeological sites, and objects whose conservation is of public, historical, artistic, or scientific interest.
- Administering museums owned by the Congolese state.
- Surveying permanent private collections and publicly accessible collections with artistic, historical, or archaeological importance to establish an inventory and ensure the preservation of objects crucial to the nation.
- Contributing to the promotion of education, science, and culture by operating national museums across the country.

=== Operation and organization ===
The IMNC's operational structure is led by a General Director, appointed by decree-law, supported by a Deputy General Director and an Executive Secretary. The institute's management framework is organized into several directorates and departments, which ensure its effective functioning. These include:

- General Management
- Deputy General Management
- Executive Secretariat
- Research Directorate
- Administrative and Financial Department
- Collections and Technical Services Management
- Administrative Department
- Studies and Planning Directorate.

== History ==
=== Colonial era and evolution of museums in Congo ===
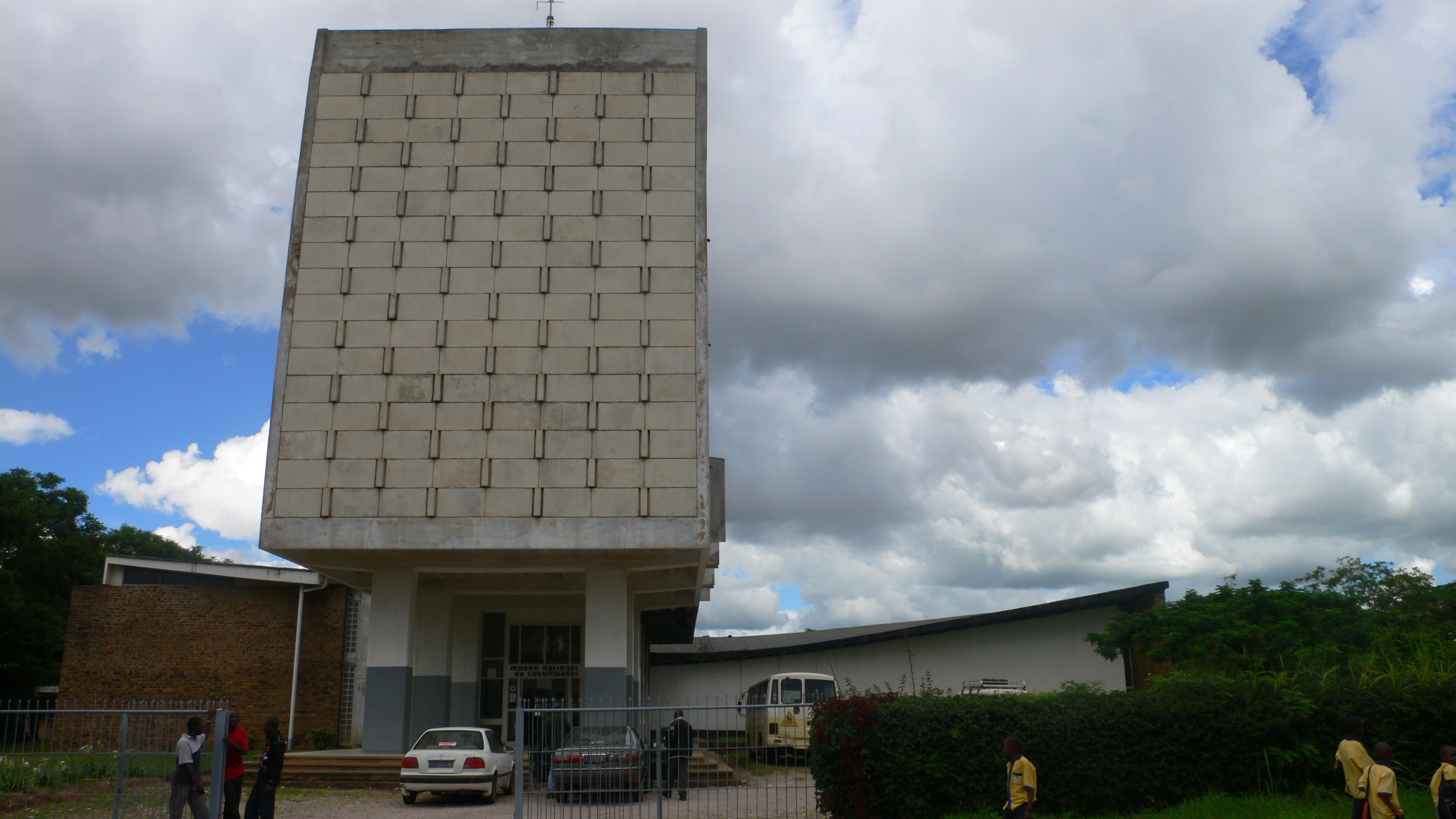
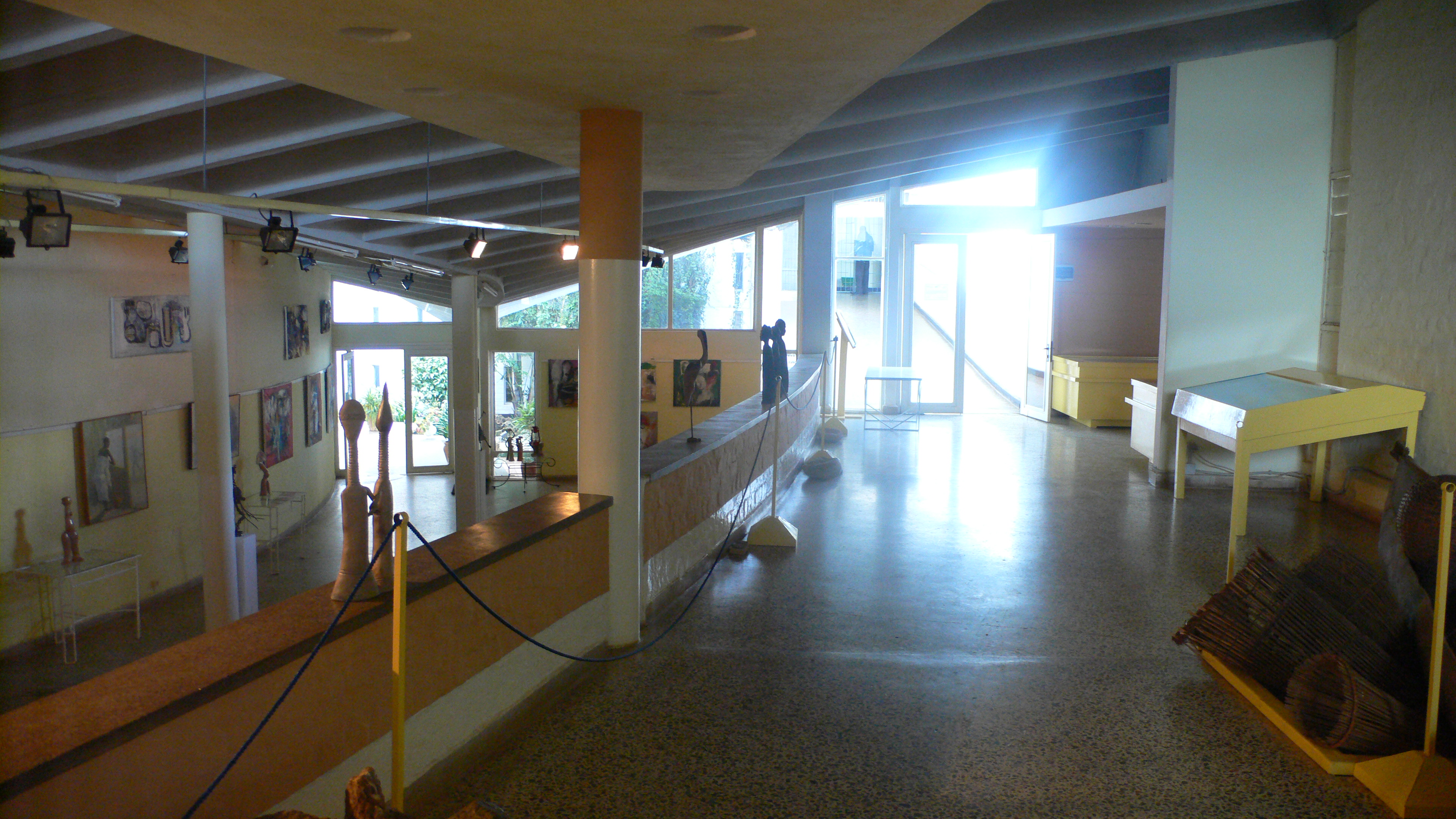
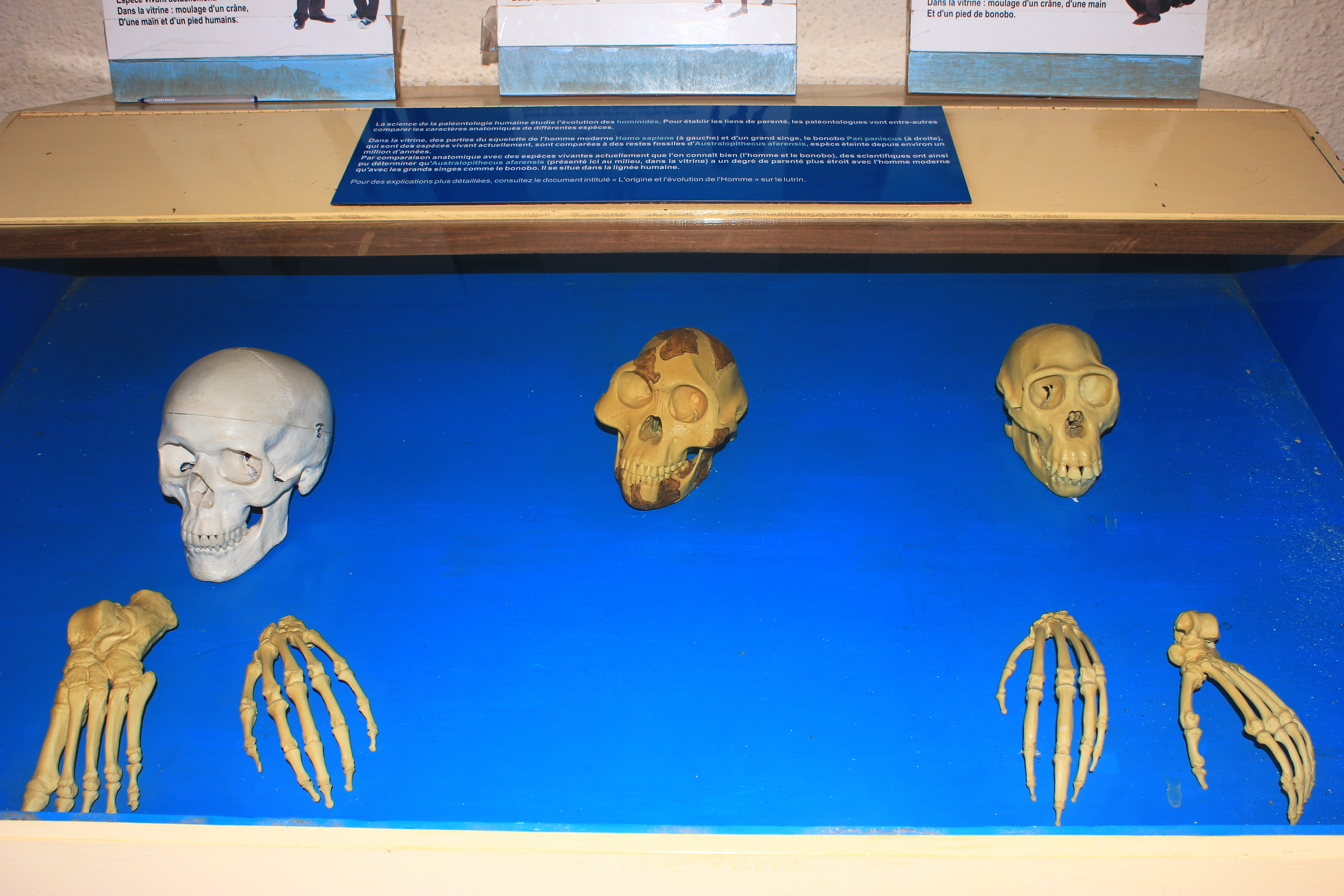
Founded in 1946, the National Museum of Lubumbashi is one of the oldest museums in the Democratic Republic of the Congo.

Before the country acceded to national sovereignty in 1960, several museums were established, such as the Museum of Leopold II in Élisabethville (now Lubumbashi), the Museum of Stanleyville (now Kisangani), the Museum of Coquilathville (now Mbandaka), the Musée d'Art et de Folklore de Luluabourg (now Kananga), and the museums of Lwiro and Mushenge, which had a relatively public status. However, the first museum in the Belgian Congo was established in the 1930s. In 1935, the Association of Friends of Indigenous Art (Association des Amis de l'Art Indigène; AAI), a private organization, was founded and housed in the UTEXLEO textile factory building in Léopoldville (now Kinshasa). In 1936, the AAI inaugurated the Musée de la Vie Indigène (Museum for Native Life) in Léopoldville and instituted workshops across the country to support Congolese artists. These workshops enabled hundreds of artists to earn a livelihood while focusing on traditional practices.

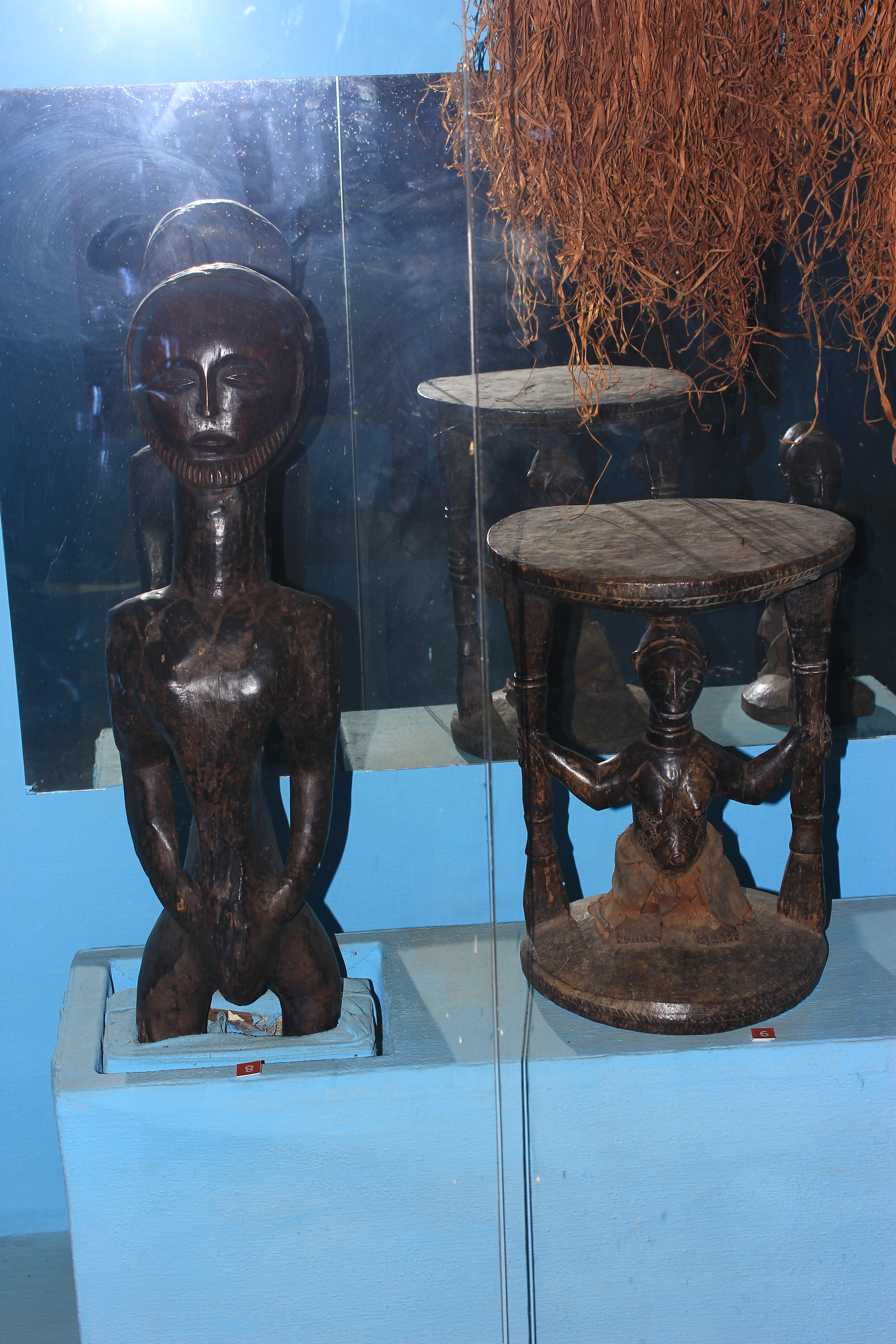
Artwork at the National Museum of Lubumbashi

Musée de la Vie Indigène's objective was "to preserve Congo's artistic heritage and to provide young artists with the opportunity to draw inspiration from ancestral motifs". However, the Belgian facilitators of these workshops, such as Robert Verly, often failed to comprehend the symbolic and aesthetic dimensions of traditional art, frequently dismissing it as "negra-ries," or "negro work". Despite AAI's claims of non-interference in the artists' creative processes, it ultimately promoted its own artistic preferences, favoring more "classical" proportions and less dynamic stances for figures. A similar phenomenon occurred within workshops founded by Christian missions. Although the colonial regime extricated Congolese sculptors from their traditional environments, paradoxically, it also constrained them to these same traditions, forbidding them from consulting art books from the rest of the world. As a result, they were limited in interpreting their new surroundings—a hybrid environment in which they were caught between two worlds. Most of these artists ultimately produced objects that fell somewhere between academicism and tradition, appearing both soulless and disconnected from the intimate dialogue through which an artist engages with his work. In 1953, the colonial government relocated the Musée de la Vie Indigène to the old Hôtel des Postes buildings near Boulevard du 30 Juin, subsequently attaching it to the Royal Museum for Central Africa in Tervuren, where various objects and works of art, including masks, statues, spears, musical instruments, traditional clothing made of raffia, animal skins, beaten bark, etc., were exhibited.

=== Preservation challenges ===
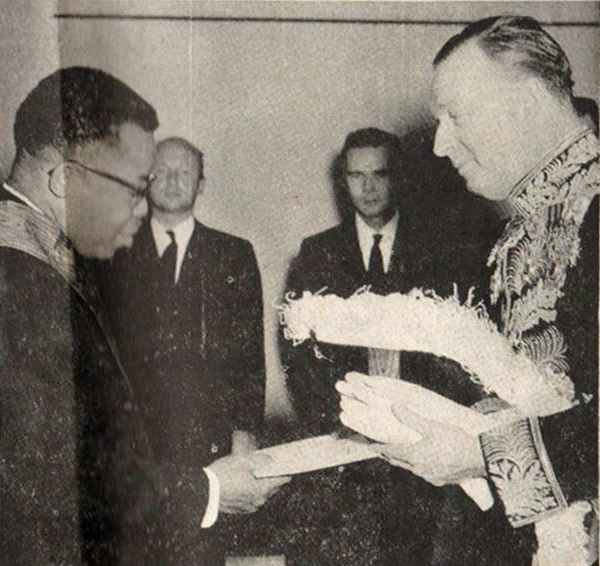
Belgian Ambassador Jean van den Bosch (right) presents President Joseph Kasa-Vubu (left) with his letters of credence

Following Belgian colonization, the Musée de la Vie Indigène amassed tens of thousands of pieces collected by many conservators, most notably by Jean van den Bosch, who structured the institution. This museum, however, suffered extensive looting during post-independence riots, with objects sold locally at minimal prices, only to be bought by a non-Congolese trader from Léopoldville, who resold them, among other places, in New York with substantial profits. The Museum of Coquilhatville, which initially housed 600 heritage pieces from cultural and traditional ethnic groups from Équateur Province, including hunting tools, baskets, fishing traps, canoes, photos of ethnographic interest, pottery, and books, also experienced significant depredations due to occupation by the Congolese army. Other museums faced similar fates, such as the Museum of Leopold II in Élisabethville, established in 1937 by Francis Louis Cabu, which benefited from a newly constructed building designed by Belgian architect Claude Strebelle shortly before 1960. However, in 1961, during the secession of Katanga, Opération des Nations Unies au Congo (ONUC) troops, including Swedish forces, converted the museum into barracks, causing significant damage to buildings and destroying prehistoric and zoological objects. They also plundered the ethnographic and mineralogical collections and destroyed a large portion of the library.

In 1964, the art market in Léopoldville remained rife with poachers, attracting an Anglo-American clientele eager to purchase anything at any price, unaware that in traditional African commerce, negotiations are always a verbal joust between seller and buyer. Lawyer Mario Spandre asserts that it was during this time that President Mobutu Sese Seko, realizing the potential value of statuettes and other objects, ordered the "emptying" of Congo's villages of any remaining works of art, thus planting the seeds for the concept of Authenticité and the creation of an umbrella organization for all museums. President Mobutu's aide-de-camp, Colonel John Powis, played a pivotal role in actualizing this vision. The Presidency ordered the collection of material heritage from across the country, including numerous records of traditional music. However, alternative accounts suggest that it was during a visit to Kinshasa by Senegalese President Léopold Sédar Senghor in 1969 that President Mobutu, dismayed by the lack of heritage to present to his counterpart, and thus, initiated discussions with Lucien Cahen, the Belgian Director of the Royal Museum for Central Africa (RMCA), leading to a bilateral agreement to enhance existing museums in Congo and create new ones. The Mobutu administration subsequently embarked on a comprehensive collection of art objects that had escaped systematic colonial appropriation, alongside the preservation of material and immaterial traditions, all of which were safeguarded within the newly constructed presidential park (Parc Présidentiel) in Ngaliema commune.

=== Institute of National Museums of Zaire ===
The Institute of National Museums of Zaire (Institut des Musées Nationaux du Zaïre; IMNZ) was established by Ordinance Law No. 70-089 on 11 March 1970. The organization operated under the dual ministerial supervision of the Ministry of Portfolio for financial oversight and the Ministry of Culture and Arts for technical supervision. Initially serving as an auxiliary service to the presidency of the republic, in accordance with supervisory instruction No. BPR/CC/0780§75 of 22 March 1970, the IMNZ was mandated with the conservation and protection of the national cultural heritage and had the authority to regulate the exportation of national cultural and artistic items, whether classified or non-classified. The IMNZ maintained close relations with RMCA, which provided logistical support and specialized training for its executives. Lucien Cahen became IMNZ's first director until his retirement from the RMCA in 1975, at which point he was succeeded by Brother Joseph-Aurélien Cornet. Over time, Congolese managers assumed executive leadership, overseeing provincial museums in Kinshasa, Lubumbashi, Kananga, Mbandaka, Butembo, Boma, and Kikwit. Between 1971 and 1980, with financial and scientific backing from Belgium, France, UNESCO, the European Economic Community (EEC), and other entities, the Institute accumulated approximately 45,000 ethnographic and archaeological artifacts and documented 1,000 hours of intangible heritage. Until 1987, the IMNZ leadership remained under Belgian governance, with the census of Congo's 450 ethnic traditions conducted in collaboration with Belgium and the RMCA. In 1987, Professor Alphonse Lema Gwete became the first Congolese president of the institute and collaborated with the United Nations Development Programme and UNESCO.

=== Institute of National Museums of Congo ===
Following the advance of Laurent-Désiré Kabila's Alliance of Democratic Forces for the Liberation of Congo-Zaire (AFDL) rebels to Kinshasa in May 1997, which led to the expulsion of Mobutu and Kabila's subsequent self-proclamation as president on 17 May, the country was renamed the Democratic Republic of the Congo. Consequently, the Institute of National Museums of Zaire was renamed the Institute of National Museums of Congo (Institut des Musées Nationaux du Congo; IMNC). This period was marked by substantial operational disruptions, resulting in a temporary suspension of the institute's activities. The IMNC's collections suffered additional damage, with some looted artifacts, including the Bandundu statue of Queen Mbala and a Zande harp, later recovered in Vienna. In May 2008, IMNC adopted a new archiving methodology, preserving the national heritage on digital media to safeguard cultural archives for posterity, utilizing the expertise of Memnon Archiving Services, a Belgian firm headquartered in Brussels.

Following a 2009 organizational reform, IMNC transitioned from a public company to a public establishment. To commemorate its 40th anniversary on 11 March 2010, the Institute of National Museums of the Congo inaugurated a capacious, permanent modern exhibition hall at its headquarters. On 25 August, the IMNC inaugurated an open-air museum on the site with funding from the United Nations Organization Stabilization Mission in the Democratic Republic of the Congo (MONUSCO). IMNC recovered two works of art, an Azande harp and a Suku-Mbala ancestor statue, which were put up for sale by a gallery owner in Vienna and were retrieved in October 2011. INTERPOL, which conducted investigations, was notified in May 2011 by a complaint filed by IMNC's Director General, Joseph Ibongo. Despite never receiving state budget contributions, the Ministry of Culture and Arts plans to establish additional museums and libraries in Kwilu Province. In 2017, a budgetary allocation of 231.9 million francs was designated for this purpose, though the profitability of museums remains questionable due to limited accessibility for visitors. The IMNC currently administers eight national museums, including two in Kinshasa and one each in Lubumbashi, Kananga, Mbandaka, Kikwit, Boma, and Butembo.
