= Nigerien nationality law =

Nigerien Nationality Code

National Assembly of Niger
- Long title: Code de la nationalité nigérienne, de l'ordonnance no. 84-33 du 23 août 1984, modifiée par l'ordonnance no. 88-13 du février 1988, l'ordonnance no. 99-17 du 4 juin 1999, et Loi no. 2014-60 du 2014
- Enacted by: Government of Niger
- Status: Current legislation

Nigerien nationality law is regulated by the Constitution of Niger, as amended; the Nigerien Nationality Code, and its revisions; and various international agreements to which the country is a signatory. These laws determine who is, or is eligible to be, a national of Niger. The legal means to acquire nationality, formal legal membership in a nation, differ from the domestic relationship of rights and obligations between a national and the nation, known as citizenship. Nationality describes the relationship of an individual to the state under international law, whereas citizenship is the domestic relationship of an individual within the nation. Nigerien nationality is typically obtained under the jus sanguinis, i.e. by birth in Niger or abroad to parents with Nigerien nationality. It can be granted to persons with an affiliation to the country, or to a permanent resident who has lived in the country for a given period of time through naturalization.

== Acquisition of nationality ==
Nationality can be acquired in Niger at birth or later in life through naturalization.

=== By birth ===
Nigeriens who acquire nationality at birth include:

- Children born anywhere to at least one parent who is Nigerien; (Note: Bronwen Manby an academic who studies nationality law, notes that children born within a marriage automatically acquire nationality, but those born illegitimately may only acquire nationality after an administrative process.)
- Children born in Niger to a parent who was also born in Niger; or
- Newborn foundlings born in the country whose parents are unknown.

=== By naturalization ===
Naturalization can be granted to persons who have resided in the territory for a sufficient period of time to confirm they understand the customs and traditions of Niger and are integrated into the society. However, the residency requirement is restrictive, requiring that the applicant provide a certificate of their original nationality and proof of a residency permit in Niger for ten years. Because people born in Niger to foreign parents, but who have always lived in the country; persons of Malian heritage, who live in Niger under the terms of a bilateral treaty; and persons who are citizens of one of the member states of the Economic Community of West African States, who are entitled to free movement among member states, are not typically required to obtain a residency permit, proving residency is difficult. There are no provisions for legally adopted children to acquire nationality in the Nationality Code. General provisions are that applicants have good character and conduct with no criminal convictions resulting in incarceration. Besides foreigners meeting the criteria, other persons who may be naturalized include:

- Children who have been legitimated by a Nigerien parent, at the time of completion of the legal process;
- Minor children are automatically naturalized when their parent acquires nationality;
- The spouse of a Nigerien national after a three-year residency period; or
- Persons who have performed exceptional service to the nation may naturalize without a residency period.

== Loss of nationality ==
There are no provisions in the nationality laws for Nigerien nationals to renounce their nationality. Nigeriens of origin may lose their nationality for performing actions on behalf of another country without authorization. Naturalized persons may be denaturalized in Niger for disloyalty to the state; committing crimes against the state or state security; or for committing ordinary crimes. Persons who previously had nationality, were not deprived of it, and wish to repatriate must request reinstatement, which is discretionary.

== Dual nationality ==
Since 2014, Niger has allowed nationals to hold dual nationality.

== History ==
=== African empires and outsider contact (1200–1900) ===
The Hausa, Maouri, Songhai and Zarma peoples living in the area of what is now known as Niger were pushed south with the arrival in the 11th century of the Tuareg people, who settled in the Aïr Mountains, by clashes between nomadic and sedentary life. The Tuareg established control over the northern two-thirds of the area, while on their borders the Kanem–Bornu Empire ruled to the east and the Songhai Empire controlled territory to the west. The Tuareg, along with Fulani and Toubou people, led the caravans involved in the Trans-Saharan trade network, making cooperation between the border empires and traders imperative. In 1405, Anselme d'Ysalguier (also d'Isalguier), a French explorer, traversed West Africa, reaching Gao on the Niger River. The Portuguese extensively explored the western coast, and in 1445 reached the Senegal River. By 1453, Venetian explorer Alvise Cadamosto had also visited the region. From the fifteenth century, Europeans worked to develop political and commercial ties in West Africa.

In 1591, Moroccan invaders attacked the Songhai Empire, leading to its decline and a fracture in its structure into separate vassal states of the Mali and Bornu Empires. Hausa states had emerged as centers of power in the south through the expansion of trade. The Bornu Empire was weakened by several succession crises and neglect of its military's preparedness, but maintained a presence in the area over the next three centuries. In the seventeenth century, the Dutch replaced the Portuguese in West Africa, and the French developed a trading center at Saint-Louis in 1659. In 1677, they captured the Dutch stronghold at Gorée. From these Senegalese bases, they expanded their influence in the region, establishing trading posts at Assinie, Grand-Bassam and Porto-Novo.

Tuareg raids of the northern borders of the Bornu Empire intensified at the turn of the eighteenth century. Further pressure upon the empire was the result of the expansion of the Wadai Empire to its east. Conflict led to demographic shifts and a lack of confidence in Bornu rulers, and the break up of the empire into successor states. Around 1740, the Damagaram emerged as a small vassal state of the Bornu Empire. Fula jihads against the Hausa states in the eighteenth and nineteenth centuries gave rise to the Sokoto Caliphate. As Bornu began its decline, conflict between the empire and the Caliphate allowed the Sultanate of Damagaram to gain its independence and control over the eastern part of Niger, bringing it into contact with the Kano Emirate, which was aligned with the Sokoto Caliphate and a rival to the area trade networks. The rivalry between these groups dominated the territory throughout the nineteenth century.

European involvement in coastal Africa led to increasing interest in the last half of the eighteenth century to explore the interiors of Africa. In 1830, the course of the Lower Niger was traced. In 1849, Heinrich Barth, a German explorer from Hamburg, as part of an official British expedition led by James Richardson was sent to the region to explore the possibilities for trade. Barth reported that wars between the Bornu and Sokoto Empires had reduced the area into anarchy. He explored along the Middle Niger through 1855, reporting intact trade networks, but noted that internal strife and external attacks made the political structures vulnerable. In 1863, the French extended their control in the Kingdom of Dahomey from Porto-Novo east to Appa. Fearful that the French might move to claim Badagry, the British made treaties in Addo, Oke-Odan, and Pocrah to cut off French advancement toward Abeokuta, creating tension with the French.

In 1864, the British founded a settlement at Lokoja with the intent of establishing commerce, but it failed in 1869. The loss of the trading center did not diminish interest in the area, and four trading firms – the West African Company, Central African Company, Williams Brothers, and James Pinnock were operating along the Niger by 1878. The following year, these were joined into the United African Company, which later became the National African Company. France continued to expand from Senegal and in 1882 having gained control of the territories along the Mellacorée, Nunez, and Pongo Rivers, as well as Tombo Island by establishing trading posts over the area, created the colony Rivières du Sud (Southern Rivers), now in Guinea. The next year, the French reached the Niger Basin and began occupying Bamako. Conflicts during the 'Scramble for Africa', culminated in the 1884–1885 Berlin Conference in which the colonial powers designated portions of Africa into European spheres of influence. In the process, France gained control of the Upper Niger Valley, which encompasses areas of modern Mali and Niger.

France set about negotiating treaties with local leaders in the area, securing signatures to establish protectorates. They first arrived in what is now Niger in 1891, when Parfait-Louis Monteil signed a treaty with the Liptako Emirate. The treaty was reaffirmed in 1895. In 1894, Captain Georges Joseph Toutée led an expedition from Dahomey with the intent of exploring the Niger River to Timbuktu. He obtained a series of treaties to establish protectorates with local leaders in 1895, such as the Dendi chiefs Aliou of Karimama (Caroumama) and Abdoulaye of Gaya-sur-Niger. In 1897, Marius Gabriel Cazemajou led another expedition securing a protectorate with the Kebbi Emirate, which was signed on 19 January 1898, granting the French the lands of the Kebbi, as well as its tributary chiefdoms of the Dendi, Maouri, and Zarma (or Djerma) peoples. (Note: These treaties had overlapping boundaries and confirm that authority on the left bank of the Niger, was unstable in the pre-colonial era. International boundaries were mostly solidified in the period between 1884 and 1919 without regard for the indigenous societies living there and their traditional ties and antagonists.) Later that year, the Central African Mission (Mission Afrique Centrale) led by Paul Voulet and Julien Chanoine set out to secure treaties over Southern Niger. The boundary with Nigeria was settled with Britain in 1898 and in 1900, France conquered the Sultanate of Damagaram, claiming possession of all of the territory of Niger except those areas controlled by the Tuareg and Toubou in the northern part of the region.

=== French colonial period (1900–1960) ===
On 20 December 1900, Niger was established as a military territory of France, with headquarters in Sorbon Haoussa, near Boubon, and part of French Sudan within French West Africa. Under Article 109 of the French Constitution of 1848, French territories were to be governed by specific laws until the constitution was extended there. This provision laid the groundwork for nationality legislation based upon whether the native inhabitants were able to be assimilated by adopting European standards. From 1848, those persons who settled in the colonies and were from France were considered nationals who had full rights and were subject to French law. However, those born in the new territories were considered to be nationals without citizenship. Nationals in the older colonies of the Antilles, Guiana, Réunion and parts of India and Senegal were granted political rights, but those in new colonies were confirmed by a decree on 14 July 1865 to be subjects and not citizens, unless they renounced their allegiance to native custom and possessed sufficient understanding of the obligations of citizenship.

Also in 1848, slavery was abolished throughout the French Empire and the Civil Code was extended to all of the French citizens in the colonies. Under the Civil Code, women were legally incapacitated and paternal authority was established over their children. Upon marriage, a woman married to a French man automatically acquired the same nationality as her spouse. Illegitimate children were barred from inheritance and nationality could only be transmitted through a father. Non-citizen nationals were governed by traditional laws concerning marriage and inheritance which placed the well-being of the community above individual rights. These laws prevented a wife from being treated as a slave, required her husband to support her, and entitled her kin to a bride price, to compensate them for the loss of her fertility to their kinship group and secure the legality of the union. Having paid the price for the marriage contract, she and her offspring belonged to the kinship network of her husband and could be inherited if her husband died.

The French Nationality Law of 1889 codified previous statutory laws, changing the French standard from jus sanguinis to jus soli and was extended to the French West Indies. Under its terms, women who would become stateless by the rule to acquire their spouse's nationality were allowed to retain their French nationality upon marriage. In 1895, the French established the administration system that would govern its possessions in French West Africa for the next sixty years. A Governor-General was installed and a headquarters was founded in Dakar, in the Colony of Senegal. The Governor-General's authority was extended to Senegal, French Guinea, and the Ivory Coast colonies, and in 1899 to Dahomey and French Sudan. The Nationality Law was modified in 1897 when it was extended to the remainder of the French colonies. Clarification in the 1897 decree included that bestowing nationality by birth in French territory only applied to children born in France, restoring descent requirements for the colonies. Under the Code de l'indigénat (Code of Indigenous Status) promulgated for Algeria in 1881 and extended to French West Africa in 1904, nationals in the new colonies followed customary law. In 1902, the Military Territory of Niger became part of a new administrative unit Senegambia and Niger, and then in 1904 was transferred to Upper Senegal and Niger. The French West African Federation was founded that year with the existing five colonies, of Dahomey, Guinea, Ivory Coast, Senegal, and French Sudan, and was later expanded to include Mauritania, and Upper Volta.

The Military Territory of Niger was detached from Upper Senegal and Niger in 1911 and assigned to a new administration located in Zinder, which would remain in place until 1926. Niger was officially administered by Senegal, but did not formally become part of the West African Federation until 1912. On 25 May 1912, a Décret N°. 27892 was issued specifically addressing the status of French West Africans. Under its terms, African subjects could acquire French citizenship if at the age of majority and having proved three years of established domicile in the territory, they were able to read and write French; they were of good character and assimilated to French culture, or they engaged in a public or private French enterprise for a minimum of ten years; and they had sufficient means of self-support. The language requirement could be waived for those who had received military medals or recognition of the Legion of Honor or were in the French civil service. Upon application, subjects were required to acknowledge that they gave up their personal status under customary law and were to be governed by French laws. The decree noted that married women and minor children acquired the status of their husband or father however, this was only the case if the marriage had been conducted under French law, rather than customary practice.

Following the end of World War I France passed a law, "Décret N°. 24 on 25 March 1915 that allowed subjects or protected persons who were non-citizen nationals and had established domicile in a French territory to acquire full citizenship, including the naturalization of their wives and minor children, by having received the cross of the Legion of Honor, having obtained a university degree, having rendered service to the nation, having attained the rank of an officer or received a medal from the French army, who had married a Frenchwoman and established a one-year residency; or who had resided for more than ten years in a colony other than their country of origin. A 1918 decree written for French West Africa was aimed at decorated veterans of the war and their families, providing they had not previously been denied their rights nor participated in actions against French rule. In 1921, the name of the colony was changed to the Territory of Niger and the following year on 1 July, having finally subdued the northern nomadic populations, it officially became the Colony of Niger.

In 1927, France passed a new Nationality Law, which under Article 8, removed the requirement for married women to automatically derive the nationality of a husband and provided that her nationality could only be changed if she consented to change her nationality. It also allowed children born in France to native-born French women married to foreigners to acquire their nationality from their mothers. When it was implemented it included Guadeloupe, Martinique and Réunion but was extended to the remaining French possessions for French citizens only in 1928. Under Article 26 of the 1928 decree was the stipulation that it did not apply to natives of the French possessions except Algeria, Guadeloupe, Martinique, and Réunion. In 1932, when Upper Volta was abolished the Cercles of Dori and Fada were ceded to Niger Colony until the areas were returned to Upper Volta in 1947. In 1938, the legal incapacity of married women was finally invalidated for French citizens. In 1939, France determined that marriage and inheritance were too significant to continue being dealt with in native courts. That year, the Mandel Decree was enacted in French West Africa as well as French Equatorial Africa. Under its terms child marriage was discouraged. It established the minimum age at marriage as fourteen for women and sixteen for men, invalidated marriages wherein spouses did not consent, and nullified levirate marriage without approval of the woman.

At the end of World War II, a statute issued on 7 March 1944 granted French citizenship to those who had performed services to the nation, such as serving as civil servants or receiving recognitions. The Constitution of 1946 granted French citizenship to all subjects of France's territories without having to renounce their personal status as natives. In 1945, a new Code of French Nationality was passed, which conferred once again automatic French nationality on foreign wives of French men, but allowed mothers who were French nationals to pass their nationality to children born outside of France. It expressly applied to Algeria, French Guiana, Guadeloupe, Martinique and Réunion and was extended to the Overseas Territories in 1953, but in the case of the latter had distinctions for the rights of those who were naturalized. In 1951 the Jacquinot Decree strengthened the provisions in French West and Equatorial Africa of the Mandel decree removing women who were twenty-one years old, or divorced, from control by a father or guardian and establishing specific rules for the payment and determining the amount of a bride price.

The legal framework of Niger was changed by the Loi-cadre Defferre issued on 23 June 1956, which granted internal self-governance and universal suffrage to French territories and expanded their Territorial Assemblies. These changes led to an increase in political activity and a press for the dissolution of the Federation of French West Africa. With the passage of the 1958 French Constitution, nationality provisions were standardized for France, Overseas Departments, and Overseas Territories. Article 86 excluded the possibility for independence of the colonies, but allowed them to become autonomous republics. In a September referendum where only thirty-eight percent of the population voted, Niger affirmed a wish to remain part of France. A constitution was drafted on 18 December for the Republic of Niger, as a member of the French Community. The French Constitution was amended in June 1960, to allow states to maintain membership in the French Community even if they were independent republics, and the following month, Niger began preparing for independence.

=== Post-independence (1960–present) ===
Niger gained independence from France on 3 August 1960. The first law (Loi No.61-26) to determine Nigerien nationality was passed on 12 July 1961. Under its terms, Nigeriens by birth were those born legitimately to a Nigerien father or to a Nigerien mother if her spouse had unknown nationality. For those born illegitimately, acquisition at birth occurred if the parent who first established a filiation was Nigerien, or in the case that the second filiated parent was Nigerien and the first parent to establish a relationship was stateless. Minor children who were legitimized, could acquire Nigerien nationality upon completion of the legal process if their father was Nigerien, or if their parents were naturalized. Children who were legally adopted by a Nigerien or in the custody of Nigerien child services (public or private) for five years could claim nationality between their sixteenth and eighteenth birthdays. Foreign women automatically acquired the nationality of their Nigerien spouse, unless they officially chose to retain their nationality of origin prior to marriage. Nigerien women who married foreigners could retain their Nigerien nationality, unless they chose to renounce it. To be naturalized, an applicant must have established a five-year habitual residence in Niger or have provided exemplary service to the nation.

The Nationality Code was modified (Loi No. 73-10) in 1973, repealing Articles 11 and 20 to 25, and modifying Articles 28 and 30. These changes were made to prevent foreign children from acquiring Nigerien nationality, and removed provisions for adopted children to acquire nationality and increased the residency period for naturalization to ten years. A new Nigerien Nationality Code (Ordonnance No. 84-33) was promulgated on 23 August 1984. Under its terms, legitimate children born to a Nigerien father or children who had been legitimated by their father; children born in Niger to a parent who was also born in Niger (unless the parent was a government servant or had diplomatic immunity); and foundlings automatically acquired Nigerien nationality. Children born to a Nigerien mother and unknown father, or foreign father whose nationality was unknown or who was stateless, could acquire nationality upon reaching majority and proving a habitual residence in Niger. The 1984 Code removed the automatic attribution of nationality upon a foreign woman who married a Nigerien husband, instead requiring her to apply for nationality within one year of marriage. A 1999 amendment allowed women to pass on their nationality to their children under the same terms as men, and reintroduced the provision in a new Article 20 that children who had been legitimized could acquire nationality from either Nigerien parent. In 2014, the Nationality Code (Loi No.2014-60 du 05 novembre 2014) was amended to allow women to pass on their nationality to a spouse and to allow for dual nationality.
