= Ahmadu Kuran Daga =

- Sarkin Damagaram
- Reign: 1893–1899
- Predecessor: Suleiman
- Successor: Ahmadu Dan Bassa
- Born: Muhammad Ahmad
- Died: Rinji
- Father: Muhammad Tanimu
- Religion: Islam

Ahmadu Dan Tanimu, known as Ahmadu Kuran Daga or Ahmadu Mai Rinji was the Sultan of the Sultanate of Damagaram from 1893 to 1899. His reign marked the height of Damagaram's military and political prowess. He inherited thousands of muskets and dozens of canons from his father, along with canon factories and ammunition plants. Ahmadu soon found himself in a power struggle with the Emirate of Kano under Aliyu Mai Sango, Bornu under Rabih Az-Zubayr, and French Colonialists. After the assassination of French officer Marius Gabriel Cazemajou and his interpreter in Zinder under Ahmadu's orders, he was subdued and killed by the French in retaliation.

== Reign ==
Ahmadu was the son of Damagaram's most accomplished ruler, Sultan Tanimu. He succeeded Sultan Suleimanu in 1893. Around the same time, the ill-famed Rabih az Zubayr captured Damagaram's suzerain, Bornu. The French were also actively expanding their colonies in Africa.

=== Relationship with the French ===
As the French began encroaching into his Sultanate, he sent a message to the French party that he only recognized the authority of the Ottoman Empire. He soon invited the leader of the expedition, Captain Cazemajou to his court where he treated him courteously. But Ahmadu suspected an alliance between the French and Rabih and was warned by his marabouts about an impending christian domination. As Cazemajou prepared to depart Zinder, he and his interpreter, d'Olive were slaughtered and discarded in a well.

=== Confrontations with Kano ===
Ahmadu felt the best way to impede Rabih was to engage in an expansion of his own. Damagaram had enjoyed a strained relationship with Kano for decades and the maltreatment of Kano's traders in Damagaram was a regular occurrence. Negotiations for peace were brought to a halt by the successive deaths of Sultan Suleimanu and Emir Muhammad Bello. Ahmadu soon entered Kano by way of Daura and Kazaure and took the town of Malikawa, where he collected their leader, people and much booty and returned to Damagaram. This aggressive act took Kano by surprise. The Emir of Kano at the time, Aliyu Babba, believed it to be a ploy by the Sultan of Sokoto, Abdu Danyen Kasko, to get him to submit to his suzerainty again as their relationship was strained by the Kano Civil War and Abdu had at one point considered moving the rest of the Caliphate against Aliyu. Given this interpretation, Emir Aliyu chose the option of war with Damagaram alone over re-entering vassalage to Sokoto.

Meanwhile, Ahmadu kept himself busy with expeditions against former Bornu tributaries, Nguru and Macina. Following these conquests, he then attacked Gumel but this attack though resulting in the destruction of one of the city's gates was repelled by the inhabitants. Ahmadu then threw a smokescreen when he wrote to Sarkin Sankara, threatening to attack his town. As Emir Aliyu had his hands full fighting the Ningi, the Sarkin Sankara resorted to prayers and employed his marabouts to provide him with charms and spells to ward off Ahmadu's forces which he later believed to work as the attack never materialized.

==== First Assault on Kano ====
A year later, having successfully concealed his motive, Ahmadu made for the Kano capital, entering through Gezawa with the intention to rendezvous with the rest of his army outside of the gates of Fagge. Aliyu however quickly organized his forces to intercept Ahmadu and ordered his drummers to mimic the Damagaram drum rhythm, succeeding in luring Ahmadu into an ambush where the Damagaram forces were forced to retreat to Zinder. Energized by his success, Emir Aliyu set for Burra in Ningi but was in turn tricked into a trap where he barely escaped with his life.

==== Second Assault on Kano ====
A year later, Ahmadu Kuran Daga returned to Kano with a score to settle. This time, he entered through Zango and then Kazaure before making his way toward Tattarawa. Aliyu once again decided to intercept Ahmadu's forces, even against the advice of his marabouts who warned him of a looming defeat. Aliyu's cavalry, led by Madaki Kwairinga attacked with much vigor and enjoyed much success until Ahmadu unleashed his arsenal of muskets and canons which spooked the Kano horses and sent the cavalry into disarray. Much of Kano's army was lost and Aliyu fled towards Kano with a few of his men to prepare for a siege.

Ahmadu continued his march, advancing to Panisau and seizing its residents and then to Nassarawa where he captured their ruler's concubines, slaves and stores unopposed. Anticipating an impending attack, Aliyu assembled his men and Arab residents with guns on Kano's walls. But Ahmadu's attack never transpired. Ahmadu fell ill in Nassarawa and was forced to withdraw with his large haul of booty before completing his conquest. It is possible that he was alerted of the arrival of French forces who also had accounts to square. Ahmadu's retreat was attributed to the intensive prayers which Emir Aliyu had paid the lofty sum of thirty million cowries for.

=== Conflict with the French ===
After the murder of their officers in Zinder, the French sought retribution. They mobilized a garrison from Dakar under Captain Pallier and made for Damagaram where they defeated the forces of Ahmadu at the battle of Tirmini. Ahmadu then fled Zinder with some of its inhabitants.

== Death ==
The French forces followed Ahmadu to the village of Rinji where he was slain on the 16th of September 1899. His brother Ahmadu Dan Bassa who had sided with the French was appointed Sultan. His death in Rinji earned him the epithets "Maje Rinji and Mai Rinji".
