= List of mosques in Niger =

This is a list of mosques in Niger.

== List ==
Name	Image	Location	Year (CE)	Group	Notes
Agadez Mosque		Agadez	1515	Su	The tallest mud-brick structure in the world.
Zinder Mosque (former)		Zinder	19th century		Mudbrick; collapsed in 2024 after sustained intensive rainfall.
Yamma Mosque		Yaama, Tahoua Region	1962		Built in the indigenous Sudano-Sahelian style
Grand Mosque of Niamey		Niamey	1970s	Su	

== See also ==
- Islam in Niger
- List of mosques in Africa
