= Le Pagne =

- Directed by: Moussa Hamadou Djingarey
- Written by: Moussa Hamadou Djingarey
- Release date: 2015
- Country: Niger

Le Pagne (English: The Loincloth) is a 2015 Nigerien film directed by Moussa Hamadou Djingarey. It was screened at the Écrans Noirs Festival in Yaoundé.

== Synopsis ==
After the painful ordeal of female genital mutilation, Mariama will then bear the traumatic weight of a rape and an unwanted pregnancy that will lead to her banishment from the village, then to her "exile" in Maradi, where she will be sentenced to 20 years in prison for having killed, in a reflex, certainly linked to the trauma of the rape she suffered, a man who solicited her for prostitution.

Fearing to denounce her rapist, the young girl walls herself in silence, and will speak only just after the childbirth, on the brink of death, to entrust to a couple her baby and a loincloth on which she took care to write her life story for her daughter.
