= Nigerien passport =

Passport issued to citizens of Niger

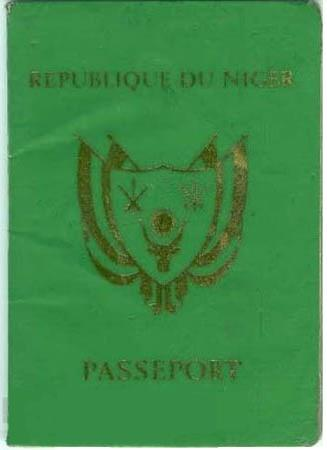
- The front cover of a contemporary Nigerien passport.
- Type: Passport
- Issued by: Niger
- Purpose: Identification
- Eligibility: Nigerien citizenship

Nigerien passports are issued to Nigerien citizens to travel outside Niger. Nigerien citizens can travel to member states of the Economic Community of West African States (ECOWAS).

== Physical properties ==
- Surname
- Given names
- Nationality Nigerien
- Date of birth
- Sex
- Place of birth
- Date of Expiry
- Passport number

== Languages ==
The data page/information page is printed in French and English.

== Visa Requirements ==
As of July 2, 2019, Nigerien citizens had visa-free or visa-on-arrival access to 54 countries and territories. The Nigerien passport is ranked 90th in the world, in terms of travel freedom, according to the Henley Passport Index.

== See also ==
- ECOWAS passports
- List of passports
- Visa requirements for Nigerien citizens
