= Zinder V =

- Commune
- Location in Niger
- Country: Niger
- Region: Zinder
- Department: Mirriah

Population (2010)
  - Total: 24,343
- Time zone: UTC+1 (WAT)

Zinder V is an urban commune in Niger. It is a commune of the city of Zinder.
