= Grand Mosque of Niamey =

Mosque in Niamey, Niger

- Grande Mosquée de Niamey

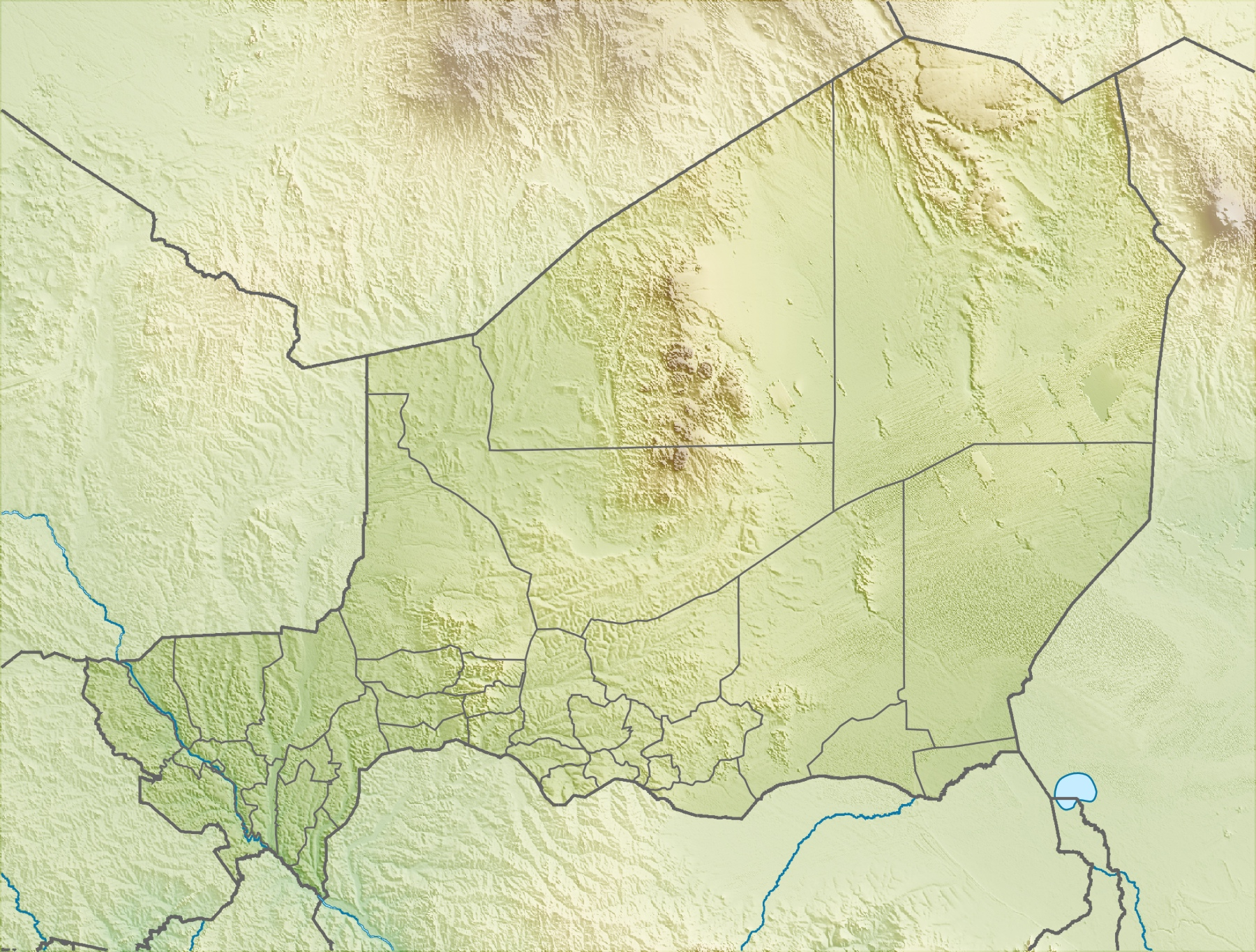
- Location within Niger

Religion
- Affiliation: Sunni Islam
- Ecclesiastical or organizational status: Mosque
- Status: Active

Location
- Location: Niamey
- Country: Niger
- Interactive map of Grand Mosque of Niamey
- Coordinates: 13°31′20″N 2°07′58″E

Architecture
- Type: Mosque
- Completed: 1970s

Specifications
- Dome: 1
- Minaret: 1

The Grand Mosque of Niamey (French: Grande Mosquée de Niamey) is a Sunni mosque located in Niamey, Niger that was built in the 1970s.

The largest mosque in the city, it is located along Islam Avenue. The building was funded with money from Libya. It features a minaret with 171 steps from top to bottom. It hosts all Muslim prayers, including Friday prayers and Eid al-Fitr and Eid al-Adha prayers, which are often attended by important figures in the country.

== See also ==
- Islam in Niger
- List of mosques in Niger
