= Yamma Mosque =

Mosque in Taohua, Niger

Yaama Mosque
- Mosquée de Yaama
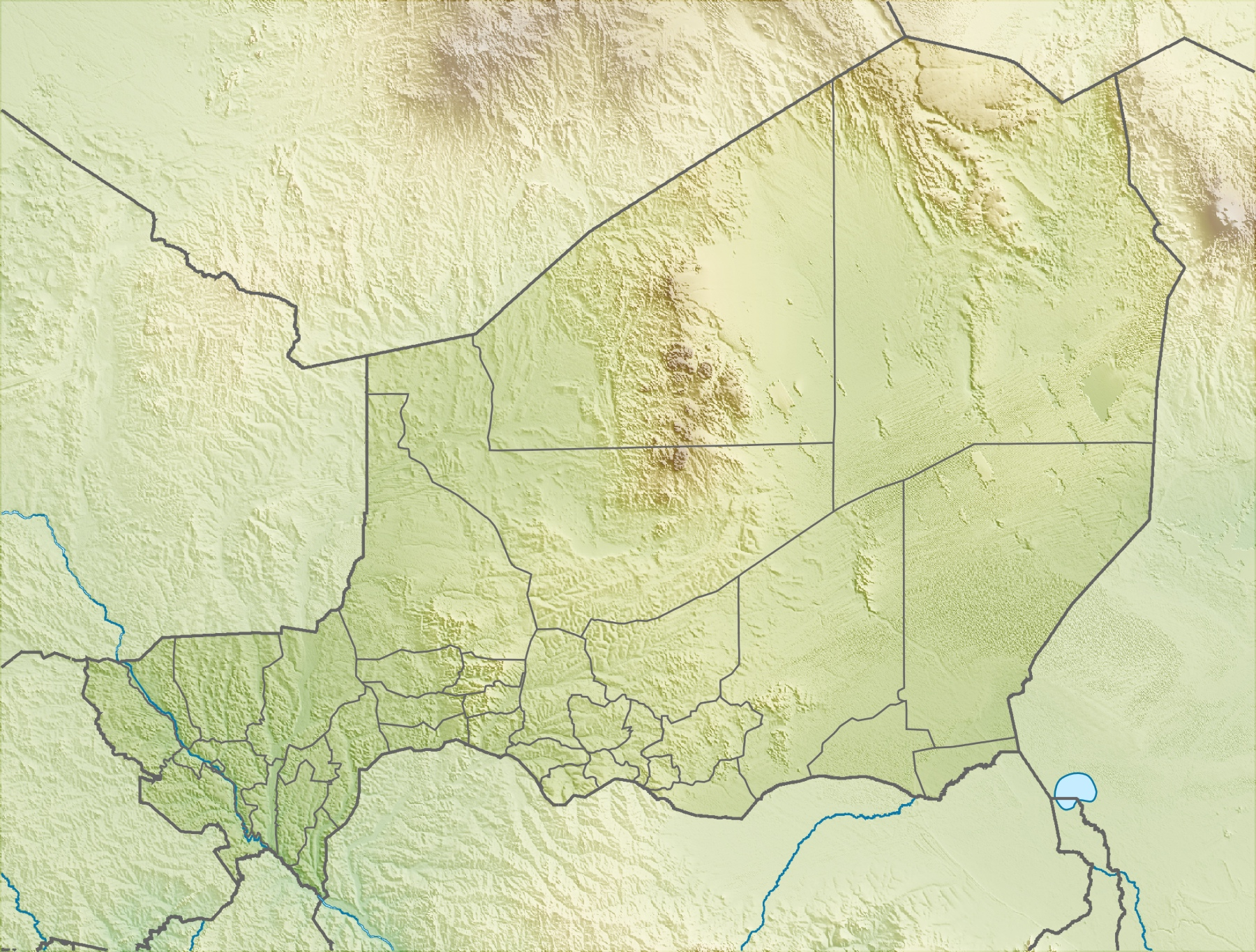
- Location within Niger

Religion
- Affiliation: Islam
- Ecclesiastical or organizational status: Mosque
- Status: Active

Location
- Location: Tahoua
- Country: Niger
- Interactive map of Yaama Mosque
- Coordinates: 14°21′34.5″N 5°29′57.2″E

Architecture
- Type: Mosque
- Style: Sudano-Sahelian; Tubali
- Established: 1962

Specifications
- Dome: 1
- Minaret: 4
- Materials: Mud-bricks

The Yaama Mosque (French: Mosquée de Yaama) is a mosque built in the indigenous Sudano-Sahelian architectural style, constructed in 1962 in Yaama, a village in Tahoua Region, Niger.

== Overview ==
Even after more than 60 years of French colonization that ended in 1960, the area is remarkably untouched by outside influence. Thus, when the village decided to build a Friday mosque in which everyone could gather for prayers, they chose to use traditional methods. This structure was constructed of mud bricks and later modifications included the construction of a central dome surrounded by four corner minarets. Every villager made a contribution; from the landowner who donated the site, to the people who made mud bricks, carried water, gathered wood, etc.

This mosque was the recipient of the Aga Khan Award for Architecture in 1986.

The mosque was constructed in the indigenous Sudano-Sahelian architectural style, specifically the Tubali substyle used primarily by the Hausa people.

== See also ==
- List of mosques in Niger
- Sudano-Sahelian architecture
- Hausa people
