= Fadji Maina =

Nigerien scientist

Fadji Z. Maina
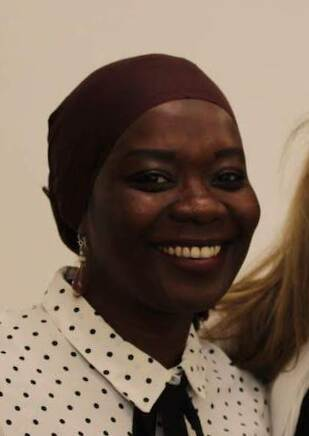
- Fadji Maina, in 2019
- Born: Zinder, Niger
- Education: University of Strasbourg
- Known for: Water resources
- Scientific career
- Workplaces: NASA GSFC; Lawrence Berkeley National Laboratory; CEA; CNRS

Fadji Zaouna Maina is a Nigerien Earth scientist at the NASA Goddard Space Flight Center. She was previously working in the field of hydrogeology at Lawrence Berkeley National Laboratory where she used computational model using supercomputers to study the effects of climate change on water sustainability and predict future needs. Her research has demonstrated that wildfire in California counterintuitively increase the water availability in the watersheds, as the barren lands impact the snowpack dynamics. She also studies the potential effects of drought in African Sahel region, advocating for a holistic response including girl education and family planning, increase in agricultural production and local security.

== Education ==
Maina grew up in Zinder, Niger, where she studied all through high school. She then completed a Bachelor of Science at the University of Fez in Morocco, before attending University of Strasbourg for her master's degree in engineering and environmental sciences in 2013, before pursuing a PhD in hydrology in 2016 in a collaboration between University of Strasbourg and CEA. She went on to continue her research at the Laboratory of Hydrology and Geochemistry of Strasbourg (CNRS) before going to Politecnico di Milano in Italy from 2017 to 2018. She joined Lawrence Berkeley National Laboratory as a postdoctoral fellow in 2018, until September 2020 when she joined Goddard Space Flight Center as an Earth scientist, the first Nigerien woman to work for NASA.

== Awards and honors ==
- 2020 Forbes 30 Under 30 in Science
- 2019 MIT's Rising Star in Civil and Environmental Engineering
- 2017 Kepler Award (best thesis in science & tech at the University of Strasbourg in France)
