= Visa policy of Niger =

Policy on permits required to enter Niger

Visitors to Niger must obtain a visa from one of the Nigerien diplomatic missions unless they come from one of the visa exempt countries.

== Visa policy map ==
Niger Visa not required Visa required Admission refused

== Visa exemption ==
Citizens of the following countries or regions can visit Niger without a visa:

- All ECOWAS member states
- Burkina Faso
- Chad (3 months)
- Hong Kong (14 days)
- Mali
- Mauritania (3 months)
- Morocco (3 months)
- Tunisia (3 months)

Date of visa changes
- 30 April 1980: ECOWAS (Economic Community of West African States): Benin, Burkina Faso, Cape Verde, Ghana, Gambia, Guinea, Guinea-Bissau, Ivory Coast, Liberia, Mali, Nigeria, Senegal, Sierra Leone, Togo

According to the UAE Ministry of Foreign Affairs, the Passport Index, and the Henley Passport Index, citizens of the United Arab Emirates holding an ordinary passport can obtain a visa on arrival.

Holders of diplomatic passports issued to nationals of China, Cuba, Italy, Turkey and United Arab Emirates do not require a visa for Niger.

Holders of diplomatic and service passports of Russia do not require a visa for Niger.

== Transit without a visa ==
Transit without a visa is available to holders of onward tickets for a maximum transit of 24 hours - except for nationals of Albania, Armenia, Azerbaijan, Belarus, Bosnia and Herzegovina, Bulgaria, China, Croatia, Czech Republic, Georgia, Hungary, Kazakhstan, Democratic People's Republic of Korea (North Korea), Kyrgyzstan, Moldova, Mongolia, North Macedonia, Poland, Portugal, Romania, Russia, Slovakia, Slovenia, South Africa, Tajikistan, Turkmenistan, Ukraine, Uzbekistan and Vietnam who may transit without a visa only if proceeding by the same aircraft.

== Pre-approved visa on arrival ==
Holders of a pre-approved confirmation from the National Police may obtain a visa on arrival (flyer visa) upon arrival at Niamey. The passport will be compounded for 1 working day and the traveler is required to appear at the Director General of Immigration the next working day to register and collect their passport.

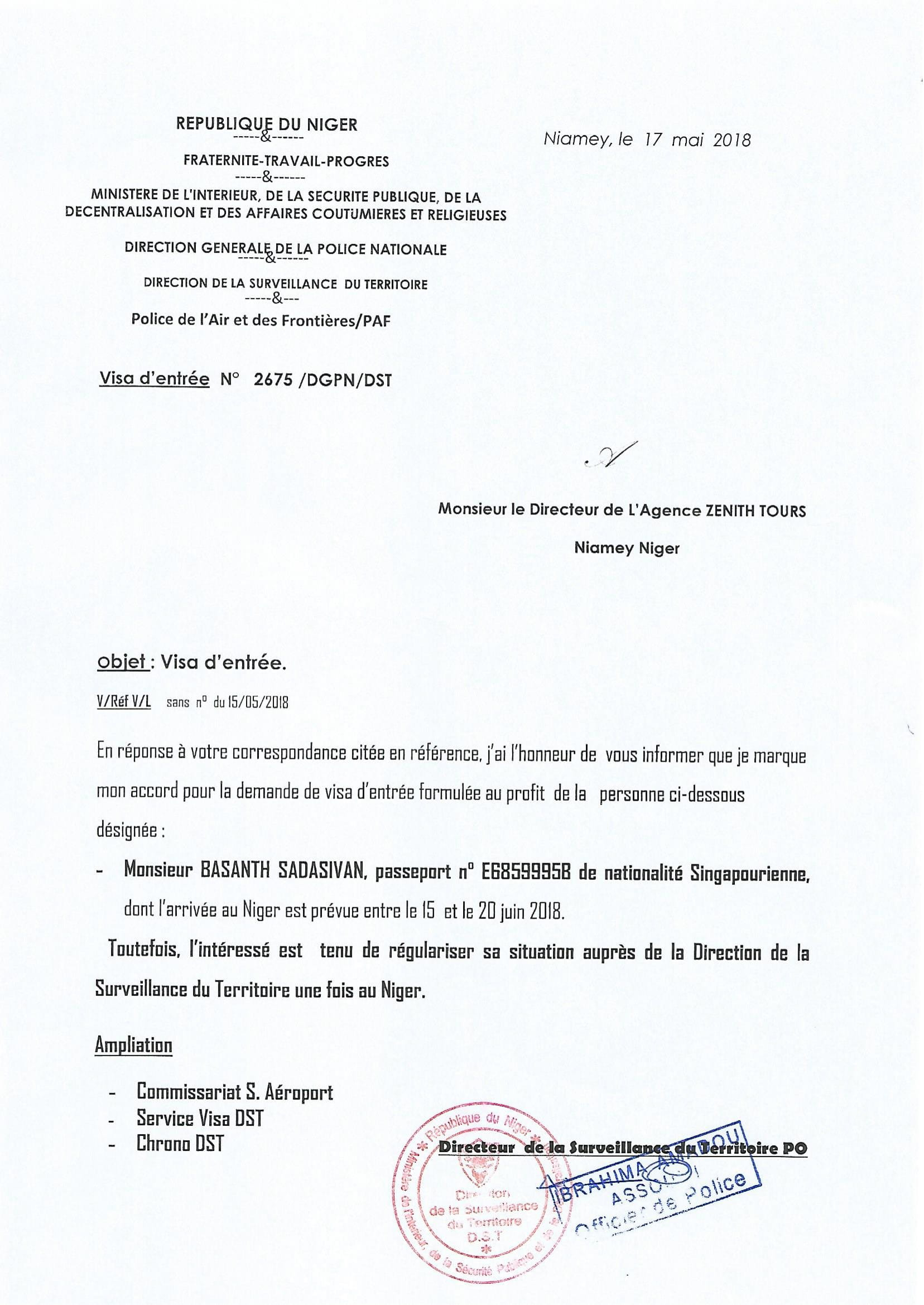
A Sample Pre-Authorization Letter enabling a traveler from Singapore to obtain a visa on arrival.

== United States ==
Entry and transit is refused to United States nationals, even if not leaving the aircraft and proceeding by the same flight.

== See also ==
- Visa requirements for Nigerien citizens
