= Zinder I =

- Commune
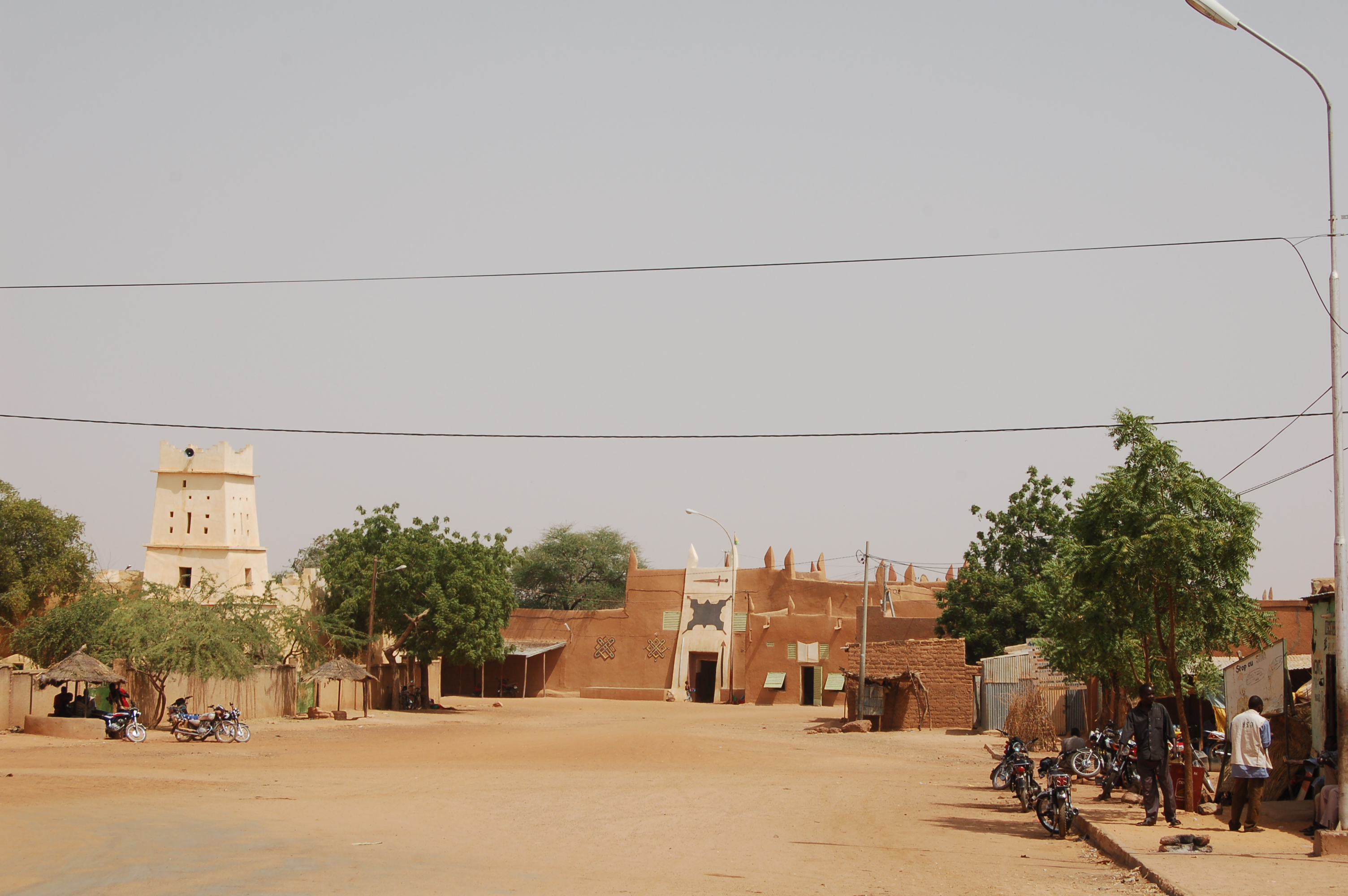
- Sultan's palace in Zinder

- Location in Niger
- Coordinates: 13.7998°N 9.0039°E
- Country: Niger
- Time zone: UTC+1 (WAT)

Zinder I is an urban commune in Niger. It is a commune of the city of Zinder.
