= Zinder II =

- Commune
- Location in Niger
- Coordinates: 13.8223°N 8.9951°E
- Country: Niger
- Time zone: UTC+1 (WAT)

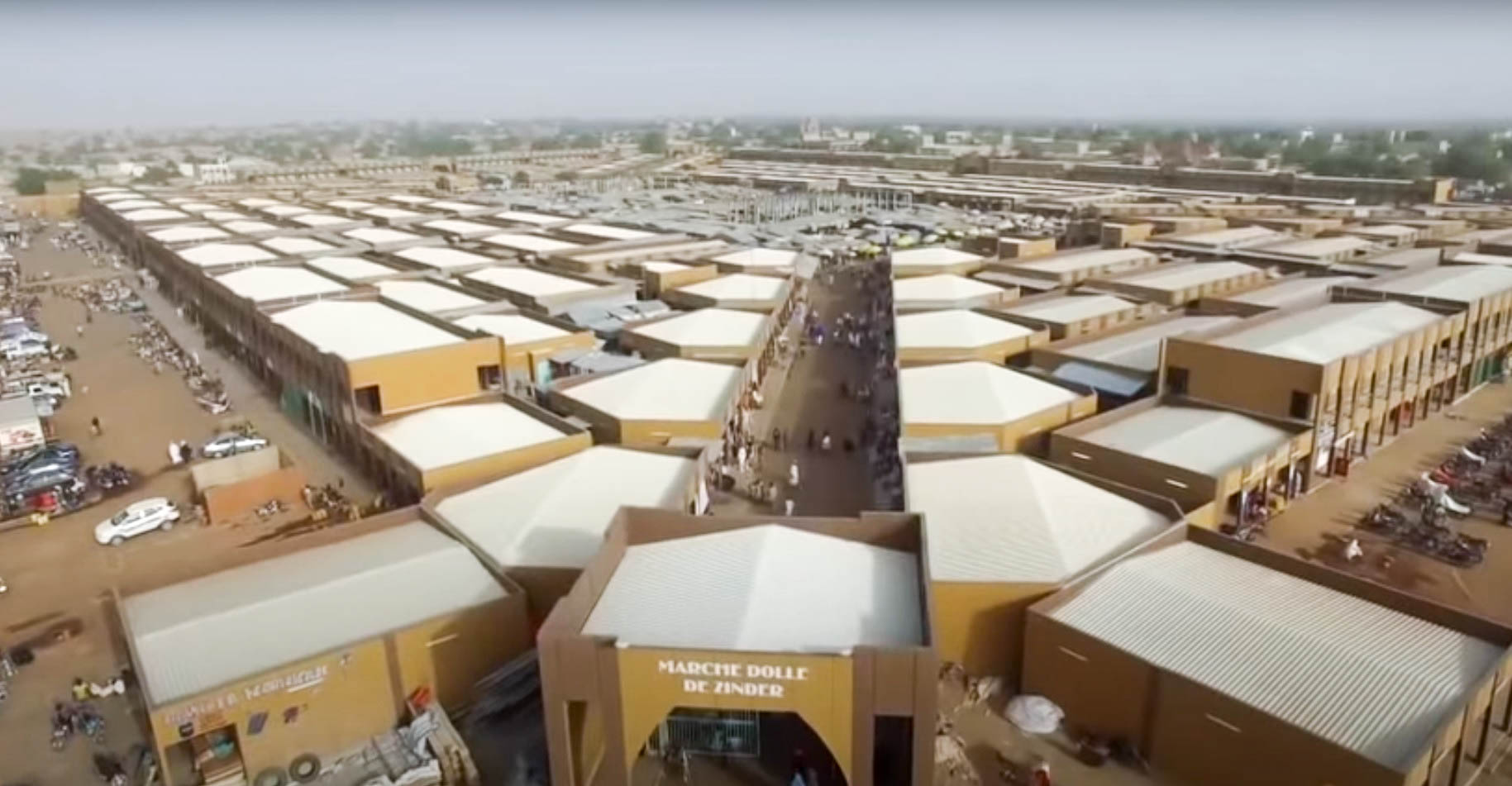

Zinder II is an urban commune in Niger. It is a commune of the city of Zinder.
