= André-Salifou University =

University in Zinder, Niger

- Université André-Salifou
- Type: Public university
- Established: 2008
- Rector: Aboubacar Zakari
- Students: Approximately 6,000 (as of 1 October 2015)
- Location: Zinder, Niger; 13.805159°N 8.9883°E
- Language: French
- Website: www.uas.edu.ne

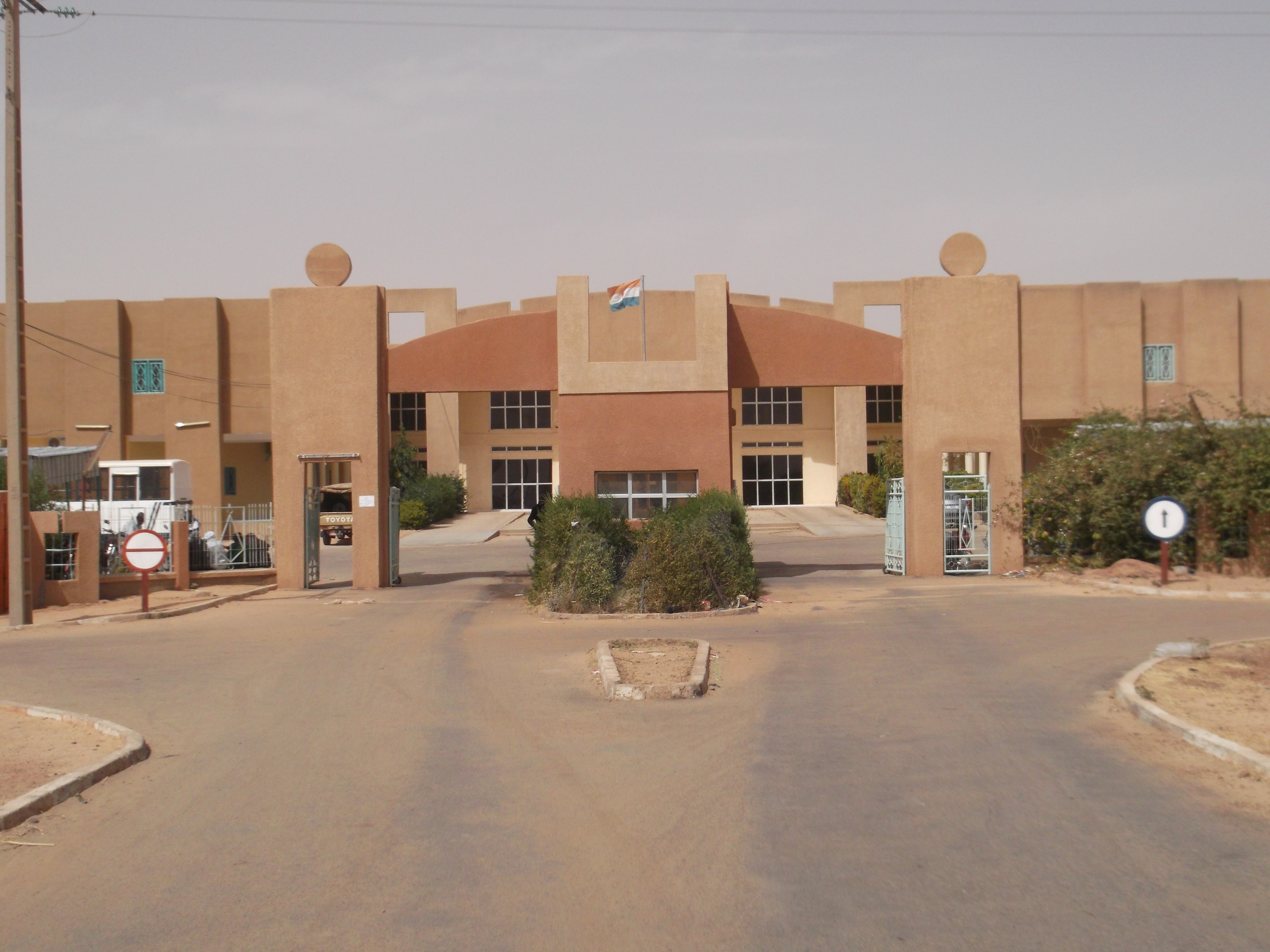
André-Salifou University

André-Salifou University is located in the capital of Damagaram (Zinder), and is one of the eight public universities in Niger.

== History ==
André-Salifou University (UAS) in Zinder was established by Ordinance No. 2010-042 on 1 July 2010, and modified by Ordinance No. 2010-081 on 9 December 2010. It is located in Zinder (Damagaram), approximately 1,000 km (620 mi) east of Niamey, the political capital of Niger.

It consists of a University Institute of Technology (IUT/UZ) which opened in October 2008, a Faculty of Letters and Human Sciences (FLSH) in December 2011, a Faculty of Health Sciences (FSS) in December 2013, and both a Faculty of Science and Technology and a Faculty of Educational Sciences (FSE) in October 2014.

Since 9 September 2023, the rector of the university is Aboubacar Zakari.

== University Institute of Technology of Zinder ==
The IUT of Zinder was established on 28 October 2008, with an initial intake of 25 students. By the 2014–2015 academic year, it had 414 students distributed across its six departments, supported by 29 permanent technology instructors.

The programs offered include:

For the University Technical Diploma (DUT):

- Land Use Planning and Urbanism (A.T.U)
- Executive Assistant (A.D)
- Logistics and Transport Management (G.L.T)
- Topography (Topo)
- Health, Safety, and Environment (H.S.E)
- Petroleum Engineering Technology (T.G.P)

For the Professional Bachelor's degree (LP):

- Land Use Planning and Local Development
- Urban Management
- Land Use Planning and Geomatics
- Supply Chain Management
- International Distribution and Transport
- Human Resources Management
- Administrative Assistance
- Road Topography
- GIS
- Refining
- Exploration

== Faculty of Letters and Human Sciences ==
The FLSH opened in December 2010 with 136 students. By the 2014–2015 academic year, it had 1483 students and 25 permanent research professors.

The programs offered at the Faculty of Letters and Human Sciences (FLSH) include:

- English
- Geography
- Sociology
- Philosophy, Culture, and Communication
- Letters, Arts, and Communication

== Faculty of Health Sciences ==
The Faculty of Health Sciences opened in December 2013 with 175 students.

Currently, it has six levels:

- EM1 (First Year Medical Studies)
- EM2 (Second Year Medical Studies)
- EM3
- EM4
- EM5
- EM6

== Faculty of Science and Technology ==
Opened in the 2014–2015 academic year with a single section: Biology, Geology, and Environment. It plans to open the Mathematics-Physics-Chemistry section in the 2015–2016 academic year.

== Faculty of Educational Sciences ==
- Ministry of Secondary, Higher Education, and Scientific Research of Niger (MESSRS)
