= Zinder III =

- Commune
- Location in Niger
- Coordinates: 13.8237°N 8.9813°E
- Country: Niger

Population (2012)
  - Total: 55,995
- Time zone: UTC+1 (WAT)

Zinder III is an urban commune in Niger. It is a commune of the city of Zinder.
