= Zinder Mosque =

19th century mosque in Zinder, Niger

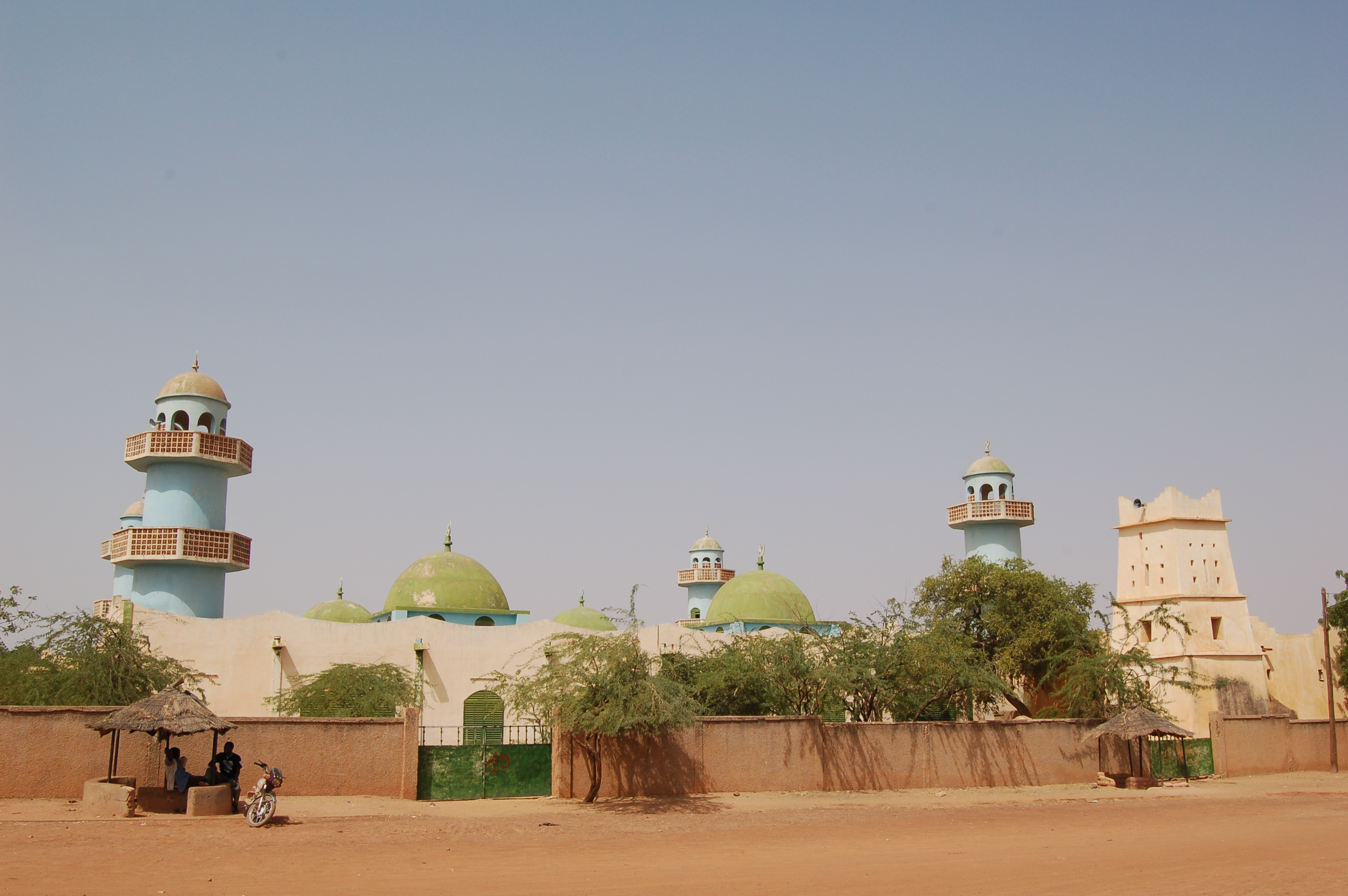
- The mosque in 2007; prior to its collapse

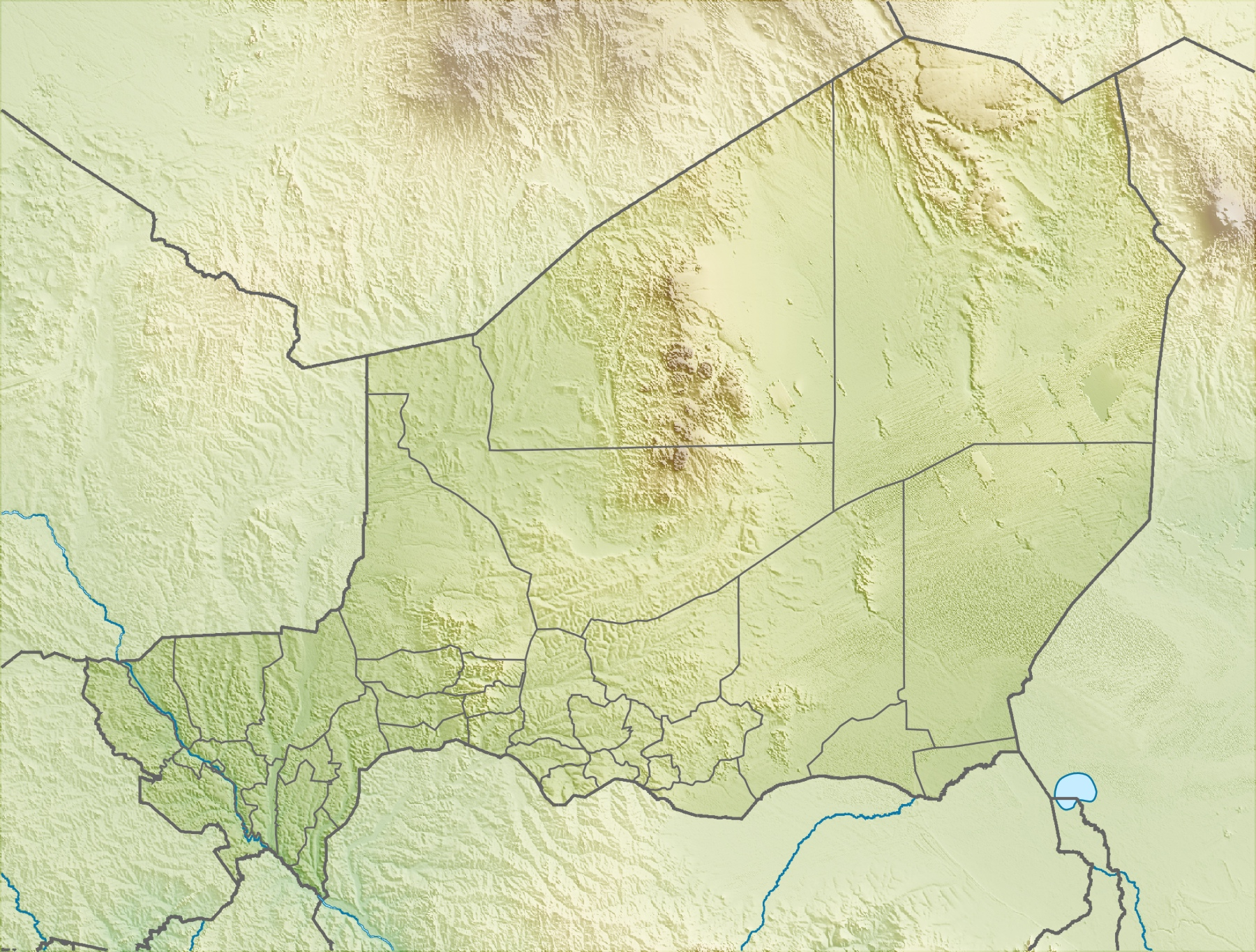
- Location of the former mosque in Niger

Religion
- Affiliation: Islam (former)
- Ecclesiastical or organisational status: Mosque (19th century–2024)
- Status: Abandoned (following intense rainfall)

Location
- Location: Zinder
- Country: Niger
- Interactive map of Zinder Mosque
- Coordinates: 13°47′39″N 9°00′04″E

Architecture
- Type: Mosque
- Style: Sudano-Sahelian
- Completed: 19th century
- Destroyed: 3 September 2024

Specifications
- Dome: 4 (maybe more)
- Minaret: 3 (maybe more)
- Materials: Mudbrick; banco

The Zinder Mosque was a mudbrick mosque in Zinder, Niger. Located in the Birni neighborhood of Zinder, it was one of Niger's oldest mosques and a significant cultural and religious site in Zinder. The mosque was destroyed on 3 September 2024, due to severe flooding in the central-eastern region of Niger.

== Overview ==
Constructed in the mid-19th century, Zinder Mosque was an iconic structure for the local community. It was built using banco, a traditional mixture of mud and straw. For centuries, worshippers from various regions journeyed to the mosque for Friday prayers and during Islamic holidays. According to Niger's Ministry of Tourism, the mosque was the second-most visited in Niger, following the UNESCO-listed Agadez Mosque.

Cracks were reported in some areas, but we could not intervene due to the rains," a local ministry official explained following the mosque's collapse. On 3 September 2024, intense rainfall caused the mosque to collapse. The region had been experiencing heavy rains for the past three months. Videos of the mosque's destruction were widely circulated on social media.

== See also ==
- List of mosques in Africa
- Djinguereber Mosque
