= Moussa Hamadou Djingarey =

Nigerien film director

- Born: 9 July 1973 (age 53); Zinder, Niger
- Occupation: Film director
- Years active: 2005-present
- Notable work: Tagalakoy

Moussa Hamadou Djingarey (born 9 July 1973) is a Nigerien film director.

== Biography ==
Djingarey was born in Zinder in 1973. He went to primary school in Talladjé, a district of the capital Niamey. Then he attended the middle school CEG 10 and from 1994 to 1997 the Lycée Issa Korombé in Niamey. In 1999 Djingarey traveled to Saudi Arabia for the occasion of an Umrah. He began work there for a production company that mainly worked for Saudi television. He learned camera and editing in practice and did not return to Niger until 2002.

Upon his return, Djingarey founded the production company MD digital production in Niamey. He initially specialized in commissioned and advertising films. His clients included the state broadcaster ORTN, international non-governmental organizations and foreign embassies. In 2005, he decided to become a director, creating the short documentary La mystérieuse croix d'Agadez. In 2006, Djingarey directed Tagalakoy and Lutte contre la désertification au Niger, the latter of which received a prize at the first edition of FIFEN (Niger International Environmental Film Festival 2006). Djingarey received several French grants for film training abroad, among others in 2005 in Saint-Louis, Senegal, in 2008 in Paris and in 2009 in Val-de-Marne in France.

In 2010, Djingarey released his debut feature film, Hassia. The film deals with the forced marriage of the title heroine and signified a return to the main program of the Panafrican Film and Television Festival of Ouagadougou and other larger film festivals for Nigerien filmmakers after a long absence. In 2012, Djingarey directed Le retour au pays, which also premiered at major festivals. In 2015, he directed the documentary Le Pagne, filmed entirely in Maradi, Niger. It premiered at the Ecrans Noirs festival and dealt with the issue of female genital mutilation of a young girl, Mariama. In 2018, the director became the first deputy general secretary of the Fédération des Associations des Cinéastes du Niger, a newly founded association of Nigerian film organizations chaired by Harouna Niandou.

== Filmography ==
- 2005 : La mystérieuse croix d'Agadez
- 2006 : Tagalakoy
- 2006 : Lutte contre la désertification au Niger
- 2008 : Sorkos
- 2008 : Un casting pour un mariage
- 2010 : Djamma, Madame Courage
- 2010 : Le chemin de l'intégration
- 2010 : Hassia
- 2012 : Le retour au pays
- 2013 : Kore
- 2015 : Le Pagne
