= Marius Gabriel Cazemajou =

French army officer (1864–1898)

Marius-Gabriel Cazemajou
- Born: 10 December 1864; Marseille, France
- Died: 5 May 1898 (aged 33); Zinder, Niger
- Occupation: Soldier
- Known for: Murder in Zinder

Marius-Gabriel Cazemajou (10 December 1864 – 5 May 1898) was a French officer who died during an expedition in West Africa.

== Early years ==
Marius Gabriel Cazemajou was born on 10 December 1864 in Marseille. He studied at the Polytechnique. Cazemajou was commissioned in the French army in 1886. He was made an officer of the Engineers. He was promoted to the rank of captain in 1889. In 1893 Cazemajou made an Expedition from the south of Tunisia into the Fezzan around Ghadames. He later served in French Indochina, then in 1896 was assigned to French West Africa. He served under Paul Caudrelier in 1897 when the French occupied the Black Volta region.

== Chad expedition ==
The slaver Rabih az-Zubayr had conquered the Bornu Empire, and France feared a threat to its borders in West and Equatorial Africa. In 1897 Cazemajou was given the task of entering into negotiations with Rabih az-Zubayr. The 37-man expedition to Say and then onward to Lake Chad was launched in December 1897. The reporter Félix Dubois, an experienced traveler in West Africa, accompanied the expedition. The British, who felt they had the rights to the region east of Say, were suspicious of the expedition. Not wanting to be forestalled by the British, Cazamajou drove the porters ruthlessly and shot those who tried to escape. There were uprisings in Yatenga. Dubois fell out with Cazamajou over his brutal methods and left the expedition at Say. Continuing east, Cazamajou signed protectorate treaties with the Sultans of Kebbi and Tessaoua.

The column neared the Sultanate of Damagaram early in April 1898. The Sultan Amadou Kouran Daga sent messengers to inform the French that he only recognized the Ottoman Empire. However, he invited Cazemajou to his capital, Zinder, where he entertained him lavishly. After three weeks, as they were preparing to move on for Lake Chad, on 5 May 1898 Cazemajou and his interpreter Olive were murdered. The motive may have in part been the influence of marabouts who were hostile to the Christian presence. Sultan Amadou Kouran Daga also feared an alliance against him between France and Rabih az-Zubayr.

== Aftermath ==
France responded to the murder of Cazemajou, and in 1899 invaded the sultanate of Zinder and defeated and killed Amadou Kouran Daga at Roumji on 13 September 1899. The sultanate came under French rule, although at first it remained as a sultanate. Today it forms most of the region of Zinder in Niger. The main military camp in Zinder was named Fort Cazemajou by the French, but in 1960 after the independence of Niger was named Tanimoun after its greatest sultan.
