= Zinder =

City in Niger

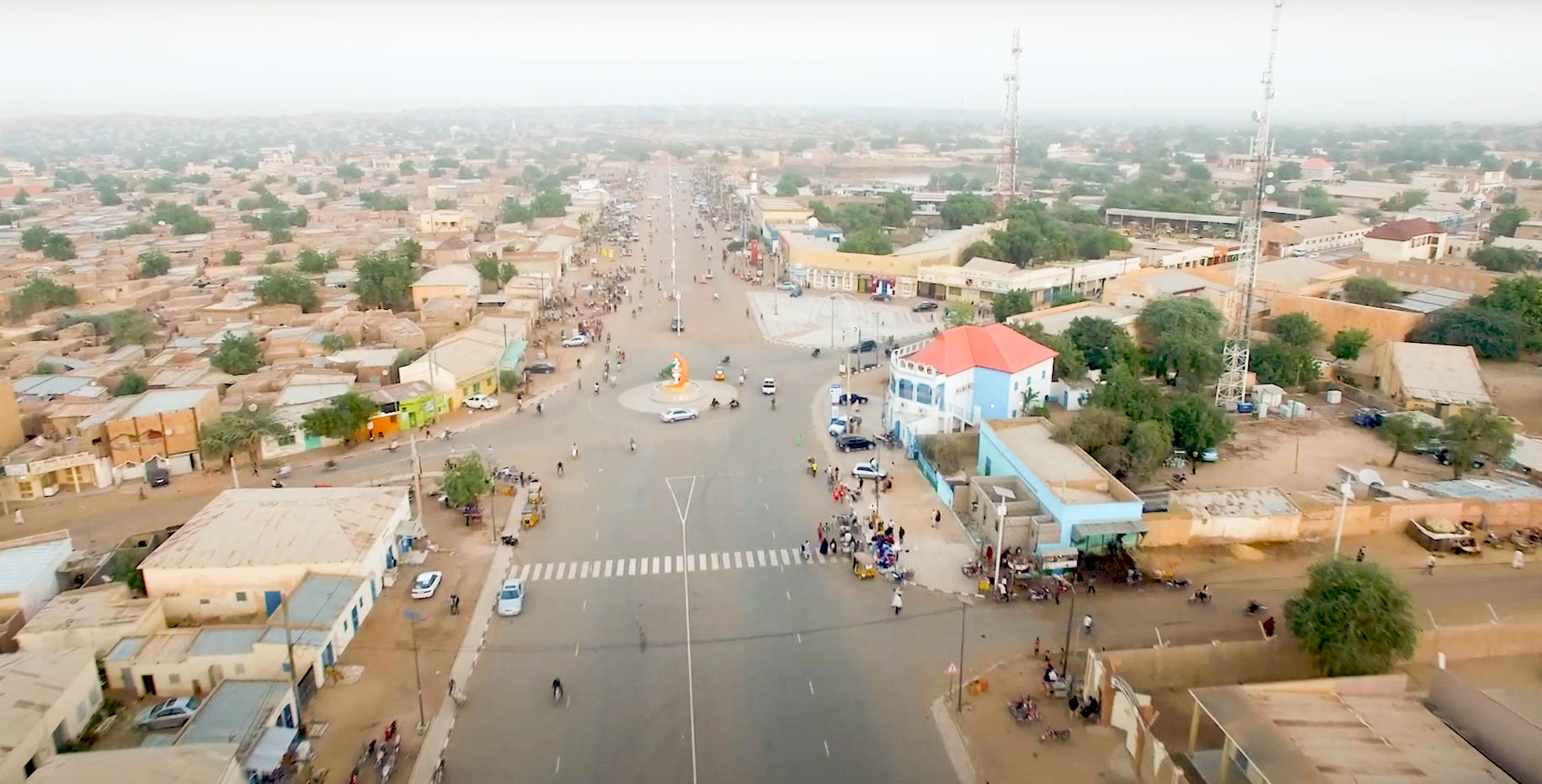
- Zinder Main Road

- Location within Niger
- Coordinates: 13°48′19″N 8°59′18″E
- Country: Niger
- Region: Zinder
- Department: Ville de Zinder
- Capital of Damagaram: 1736
- Elevation: 479 m (1,572 ft)

Population (2012)
  - Total: 235,605
- Time zone: UTC+1

Zinder (locally, Damagaram), formerly also spelled Sinder, is the third largest city in Niger, with a population of 235,605 as by the 2012 census. It is situated 861 km (535 mi) east of the capital Niamey and 240 km (150 mi) north of the Nigerian city of Kano.

== History ==
=== Early history ===
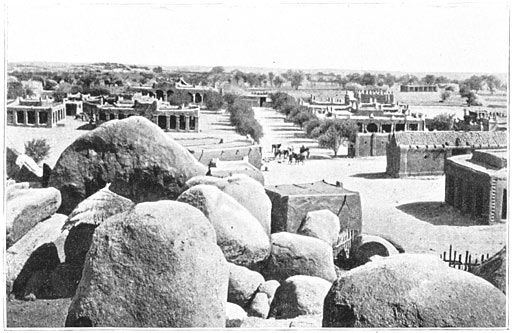
Zinder in 1906

Zinder was originally the site of the small Hausa village of Zengou. The town grew dramatically in importance following the arrival of Kanuri aristocrats in 1736, who built a new fortified quarter called Birni to the south and declared the town of Zinder as the capital of the Sultanate of Damagaram in 1736. Thereafter Zinder became an important centre of the Trans-Saharan trade and a major hub for trade south through Kano and east to Bornu. The sultanate remained nominally subject to the Borno Empire until the reign of Sultan Tanimoune Dan Souleymane in the mid-to-late 19th century, who declared independence and initiated a phase of vigorous expansion.

Europeans began exploring the region in the 19th century, beginning with German explorer Heinrich Barth, who stayed in Zinder in 1851, and later the French explorer Marius Gabriel Cazemajou, who was killed in the city in 1897. It was then, after a brief resistance, occupied in July 1899 by Lt. Pallier of the Voulet-Chanoine mission. The French barracks was called Fort Cazemajou and it served as the capital of the Niger Military Territory upon its creation in 1911. In 1926, following fears of Hausa revolts and improving relations with the Djerma of the west, the capital was transferred back to the village of Niamey.

Upon Niger's independence from France, the town's fort was renamed for Sultane Tanimoune.

=== Recent history ===
In 2003, telecommunications company Celtel arrived in Zinder, building a mobile phone tower and selling prepaid phone cards to residents. This arrival of the mobile phone drastically changed the predominant modes of communication in the city, allowing traders to have a faster and more affordable means of communicating with buyers and sellers. This is an example of how cellular towers in the developing world have begun to transform the market.

In September 2024, the Zinder Mosque, one of Niger's oldest mosques and a significant cultural and religious site in the city, collapsed due to intense rainfall.

== Geography ==
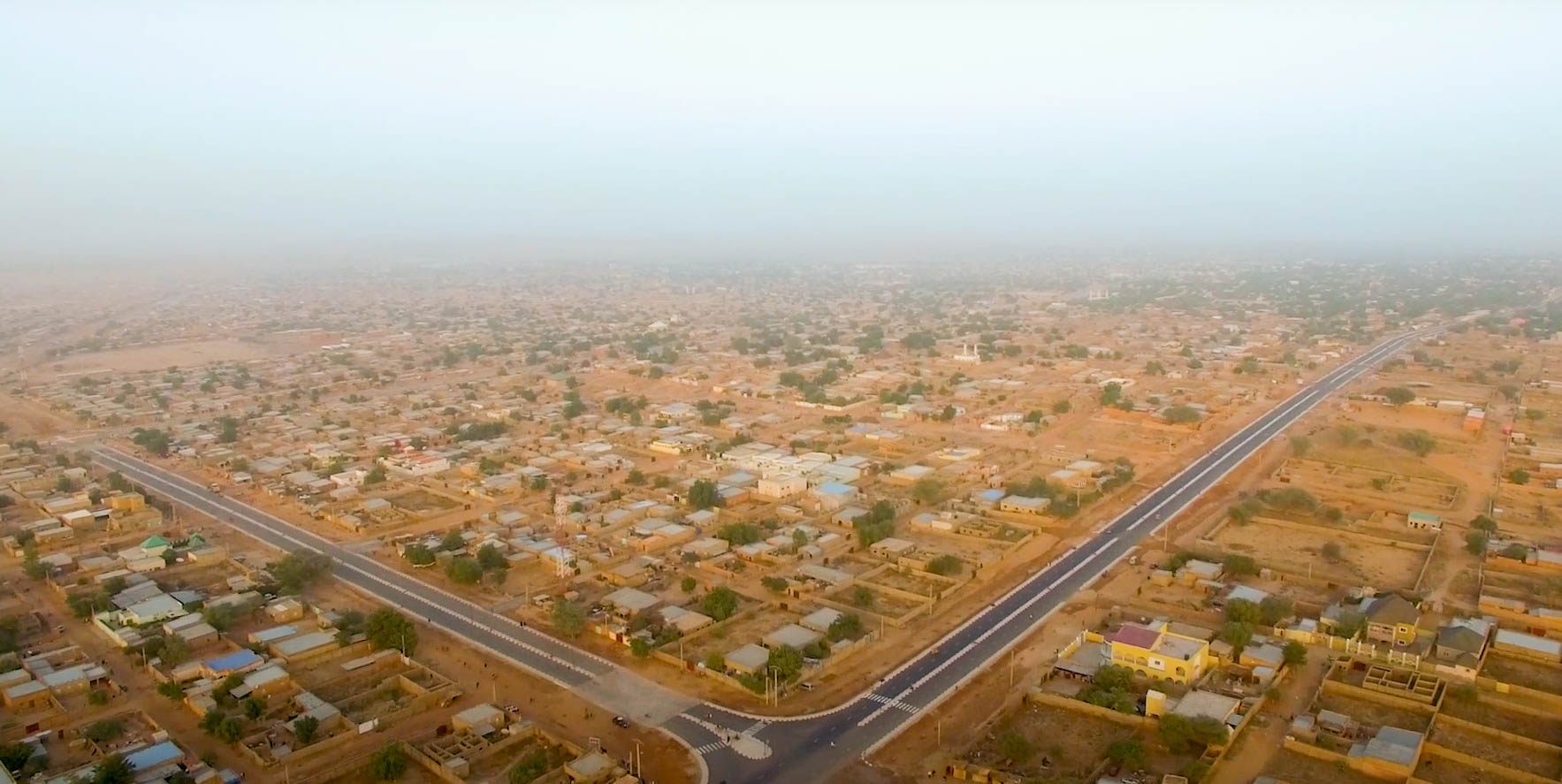
Zinder from the sky

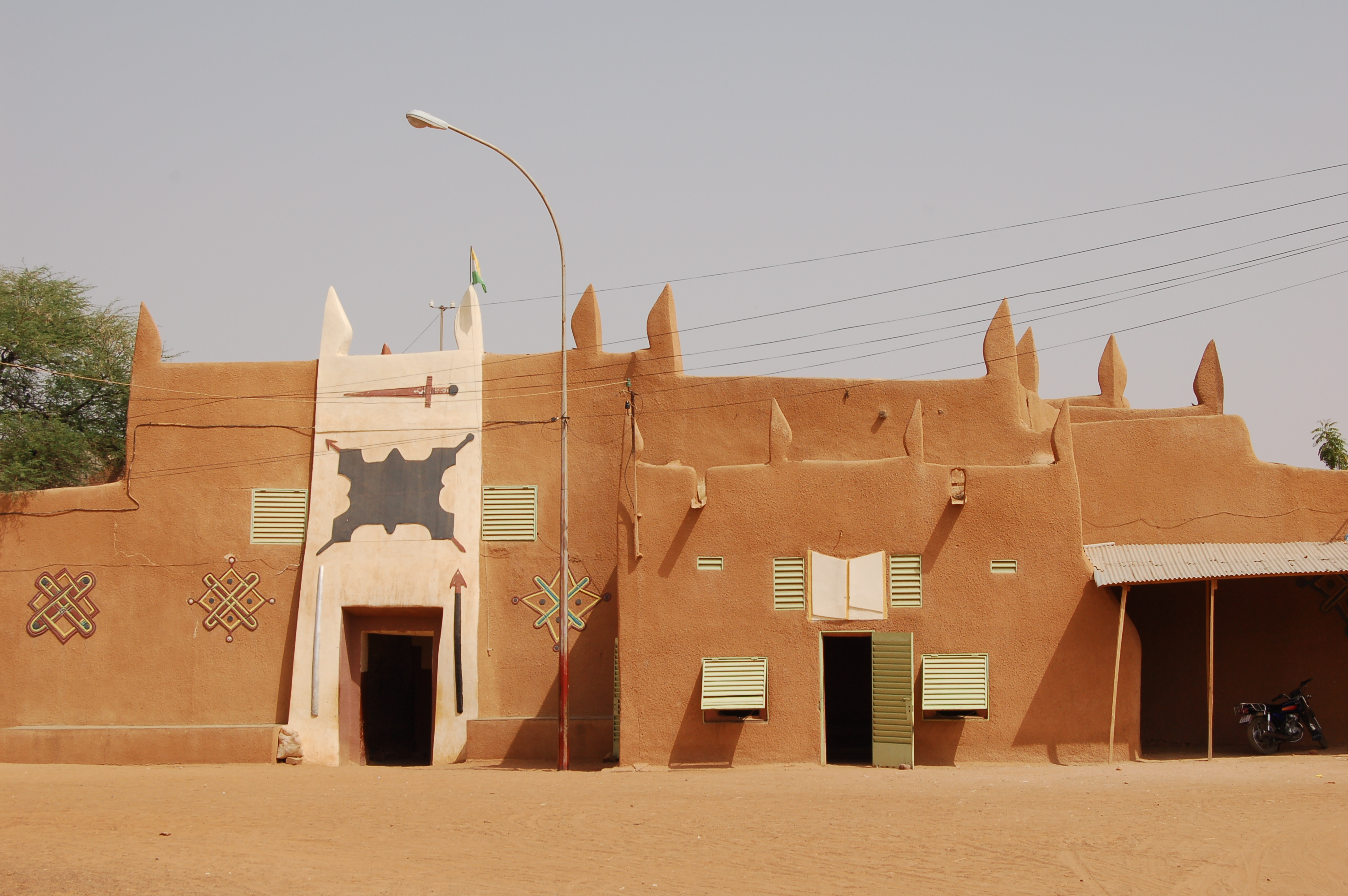
The Sultan's Palace

The centre of Zinder consists of three main areas: in the north is Zengou or Zango, the old Tuareg suburb, is known for its vernacular architecture, and in the south lies Birni, the old Hausa town, which is home to Zinder Great Mosque, Fort Tanimoune and the Sultan's Palace, as well as a museum. Sabon Gari (the new town), lies between Birni and Zengou, and is the commercial centre, known for its large market (the Grand Marché). The city now sprawls to the north and west, extending to the Karkada section, in the north; other neighbourhoods include Garin Mallam and Gawon Kollia.

The city has many distinctive granite rocks which can result in standing water during the rainy season, though the city has a long history of water shortages. Recently water was piped by a Chinese-owned company from the north to provide water to most of the city, however, this problem is likely to continue due to expected population growth.

The city is divided into 5 urban municipalities: Zinder I, Zinder II, Zinder III, Zinder IV and Zinder V.

== Demographics ==
Historical population
Year	Pop.	±%
1977	53,914	—
1988	119,827	+122.3%
2001	170,575	+42.4%
2012	235,605	+38.1%

The population of Zinder City has quadrupled from around 50,000 inhabitants in 1977 to over 200,000 people in 2012.

== Transport ==
Zinder Airport (code: ZND) is located a few kilometres southwest of the town.

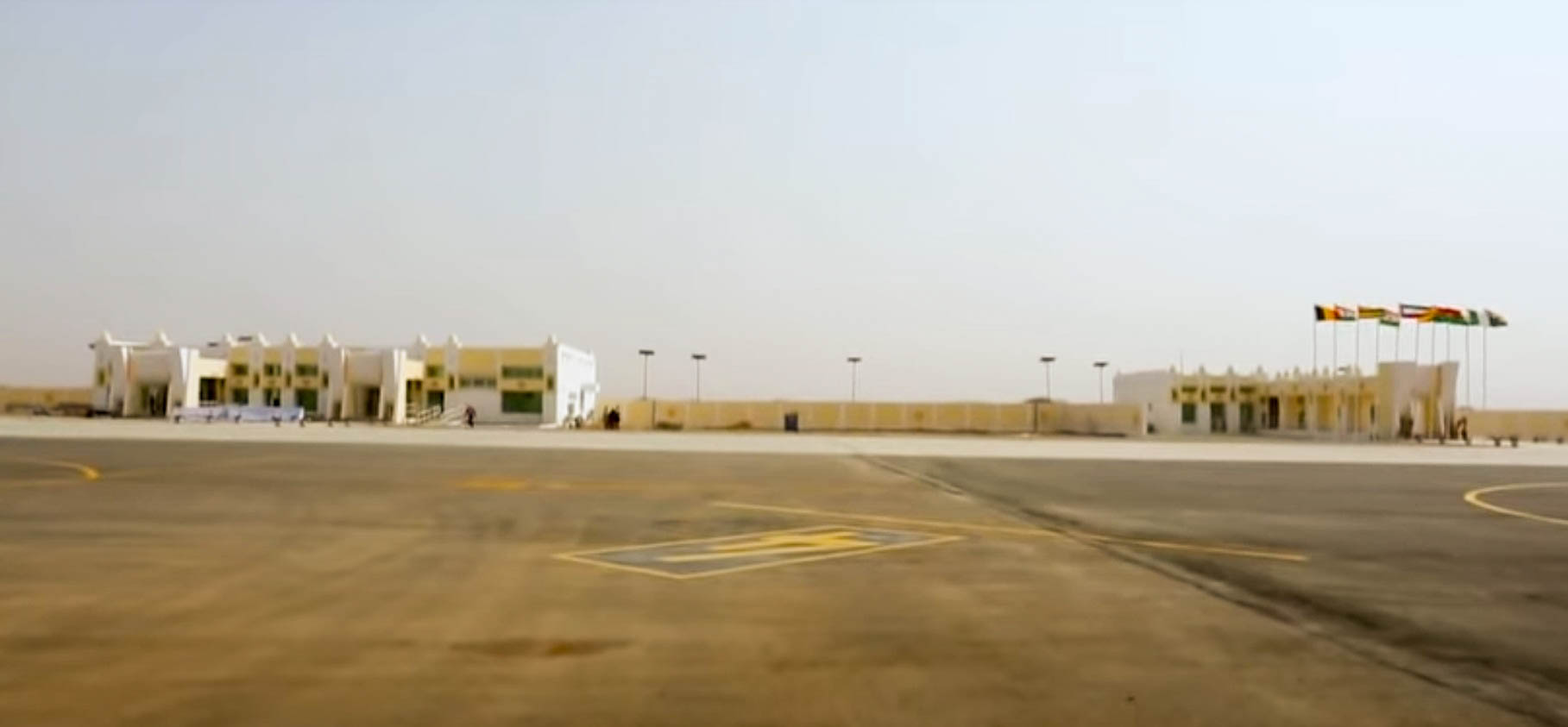
Zinder International Airport

== Economy ==
The economy of the city is still largely based on the agricultural activities of the surroundings. Today, the city counts four officially recognised industries: Tannerie Malam Yaro (leather tanning), Gidan Alkaki (cake production), Sahara Sahel Foods (processing of non-wood forest produce) and SORAZ (petrol refinery located 50km North of the city). The latter is Niger Republic's first oil refinery and was commissioned in November 2011.

== Education ==
- André-Salifou University (2010)

== Climate ==
Zinder has a hot arid climate (Köppen BWh) bordering upon a hot semi-arid climate (BSh). Temperatures are hot to sweltering year-round by day – only December and January in the middle of the dry season average below 90 °F or 32.2 °C — whilst morning temperatures range from pleasant at the height of the dry season to uncomfortable in the months immediately preceding the first rains. The temperature rarely drops below 54 °F (12.2 °C) or rises above 108 °F (42.2 °C). There is essentially no rainfall from October to May, and almost three-quarters of the total annual rainfall of 410 millimetres or 16 inches occurs in July and August alone, accompanied by hot temperatures and much higher humidity than seen during the remainder of the year. Sunshine is extremely high year-round, being only marginally reduced during the wet season.

Climate data for Zinder Airport (1961–1990)
Month	Jan	Feb	Mar	Apr	May	Jun	Jul	Aug	Sep	Oct	Nov	Dec	Year
Mean maximum °C (°F)	34.3 (93.7)	37.6 (99.7)	40.8 (105.4)	42.5 (108.5)	42.8 (109.0)	41.9 (107.4)	38.7 (101.7)	36.4 (97.5)	38.5 (101.3)	39.3 (102.7)	36.9 (98.4)	35.0 (95.0)	42.8 (109.0)
Mean daily maximum °C (°F)	29.3 (84.7)	32.5 (90.5)	36.3 (97.3)	39.7 (103.5)	40.6 (105.1)	38.1 (100.6)	34.9 (94.8)	32.7 (90.9)	35.5 (95.9)	37.1 (98.8)	33.7 (92.7)	28.3 (82.9)	36.2 (97.2)
Daily mean °C (°F)	21.9 (71.4)	24.8 (76.6)	28.8 (83.8)	32.3 (90.1)	33.3 (91.9)	31.9 (89.4)	29.2 (84.6)	27.8 (82.0)	29.4 (84.9)	30.0 (86.0)	26.0 (78.8)	22.9 (73.2)	28.2 (82.8)
Mean daily minimum °C (°F)	14.7 (58.5)	17.1 (62.8)	21.4 (70.5)	25.0 (77.0)	26.6 (79.9)	25.6 (78.1)	23.7 (74.7)	23.2 (73.8)	23.7 (74.7)	22.9 (73.2)	18.6 (65.5)	15.4 (59.7)	21.5 (70.7)
Mean minimum °C (°F)	10.6 (51.1)	12.4 (54.3)	15.8 (60.4)	20.3 (68.5)	22.1 (71.8)	21.2 (70.2)	19.6 (67.3)	19.3 (66.7)	20.1 (68.2)	19.1 (66.4)	14.2 (57.6)	11.5 (52.7)	10.6 (51.1)
Average rainfall mm (inches)	0.0 (0.0)	0.1 (0.00)	0.5 (0.02)	1.0 (0.04)	14.8 (0.58)	39.2 (1.54)	128.6 (5.06)	168.1 (6.62)	53.5 (2.11)	5.0 (0.20)	0.2 (0.01)	0.0 (0.0)	411.2 (16.19)
Mean monthly sunshine hours	291.4	268.8	275.9	270.0	297.6	288.0	269.7	257.3	267.0	291.4	291.0	291.4	3,358
Mean daily sunshine hours	9.4	9.6	8.9	9.0	9.6	9.6	8.7	8.3	8.9	9.4	9.7	9.4	9.2
Source: NOAA

== Notable residents ==
- Moussa Hamadou Djingarey (born 1973), film director
- Fadji Maina, scientist

== Gallery ==
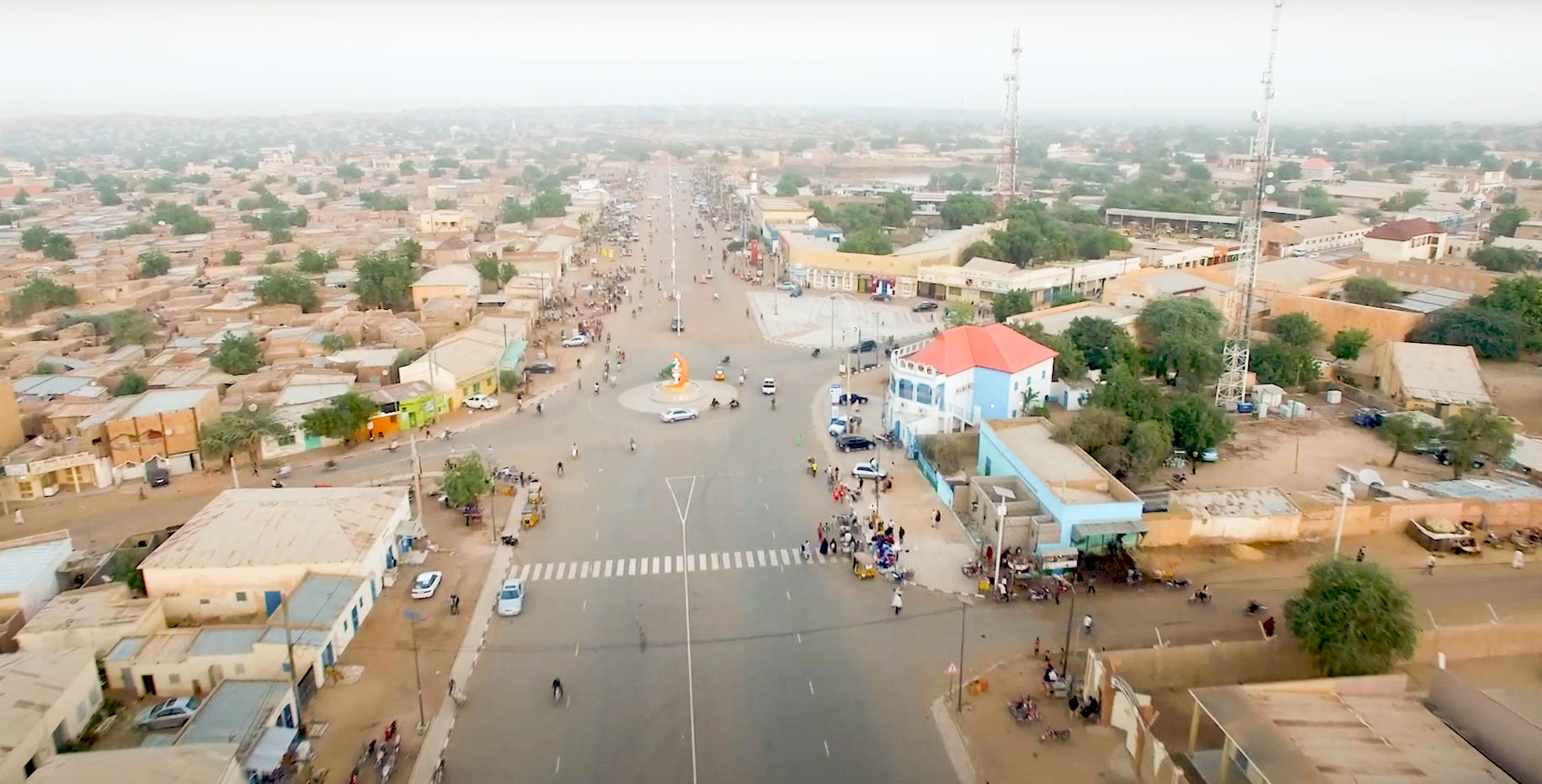
Zinder city center

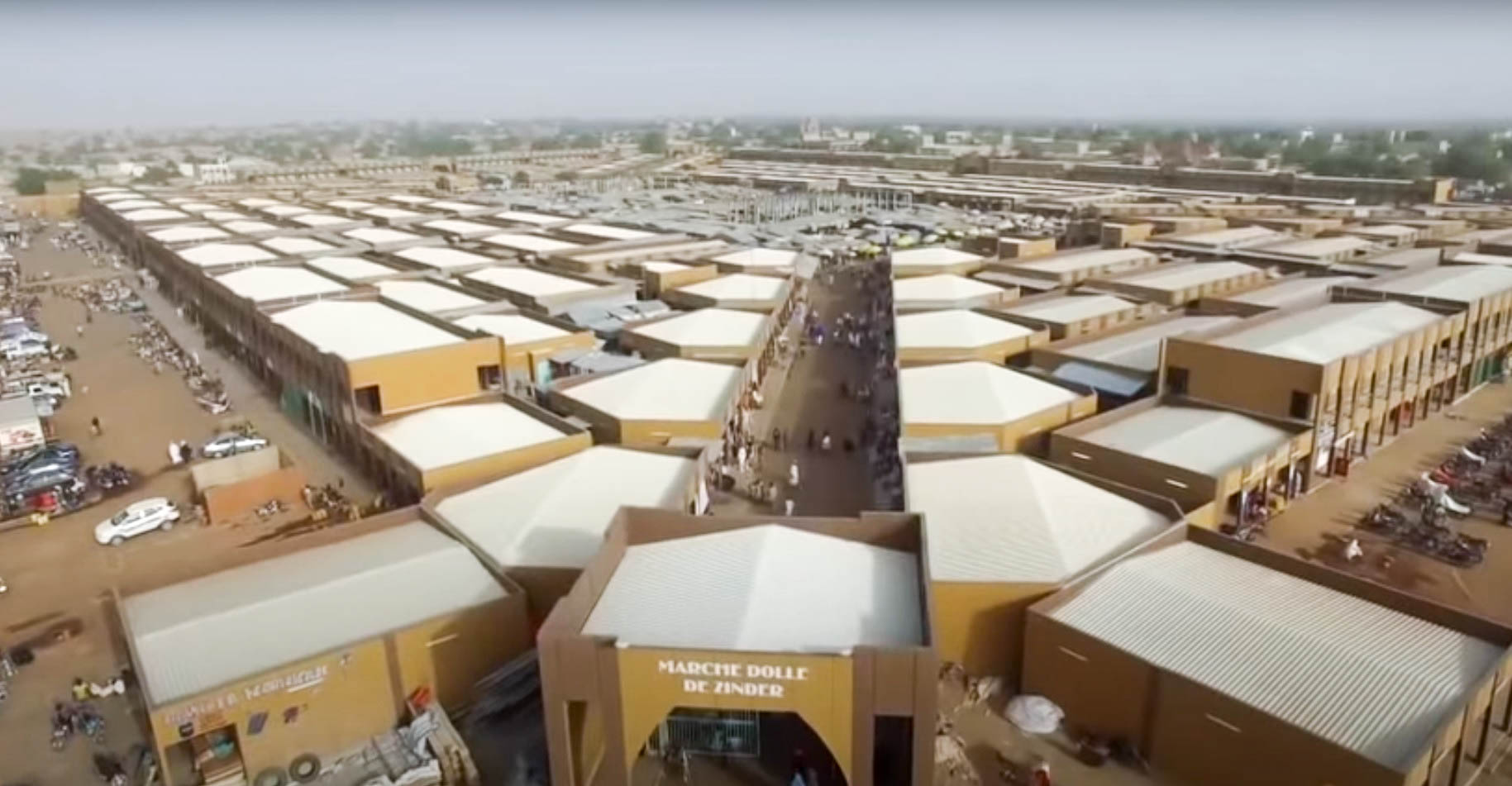
Dolé Market in Zinder

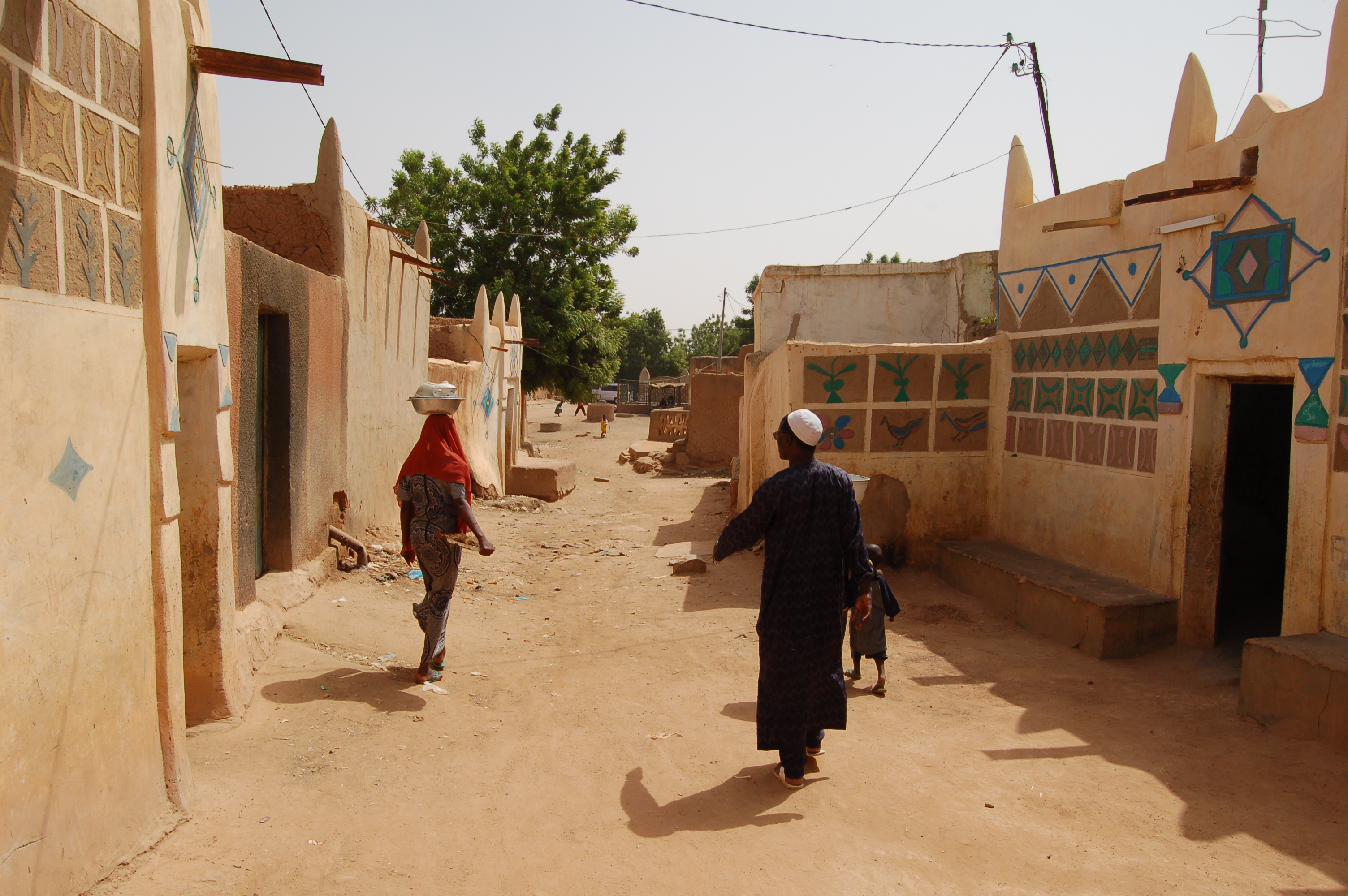
Traditional Hausa architecture in Zinder

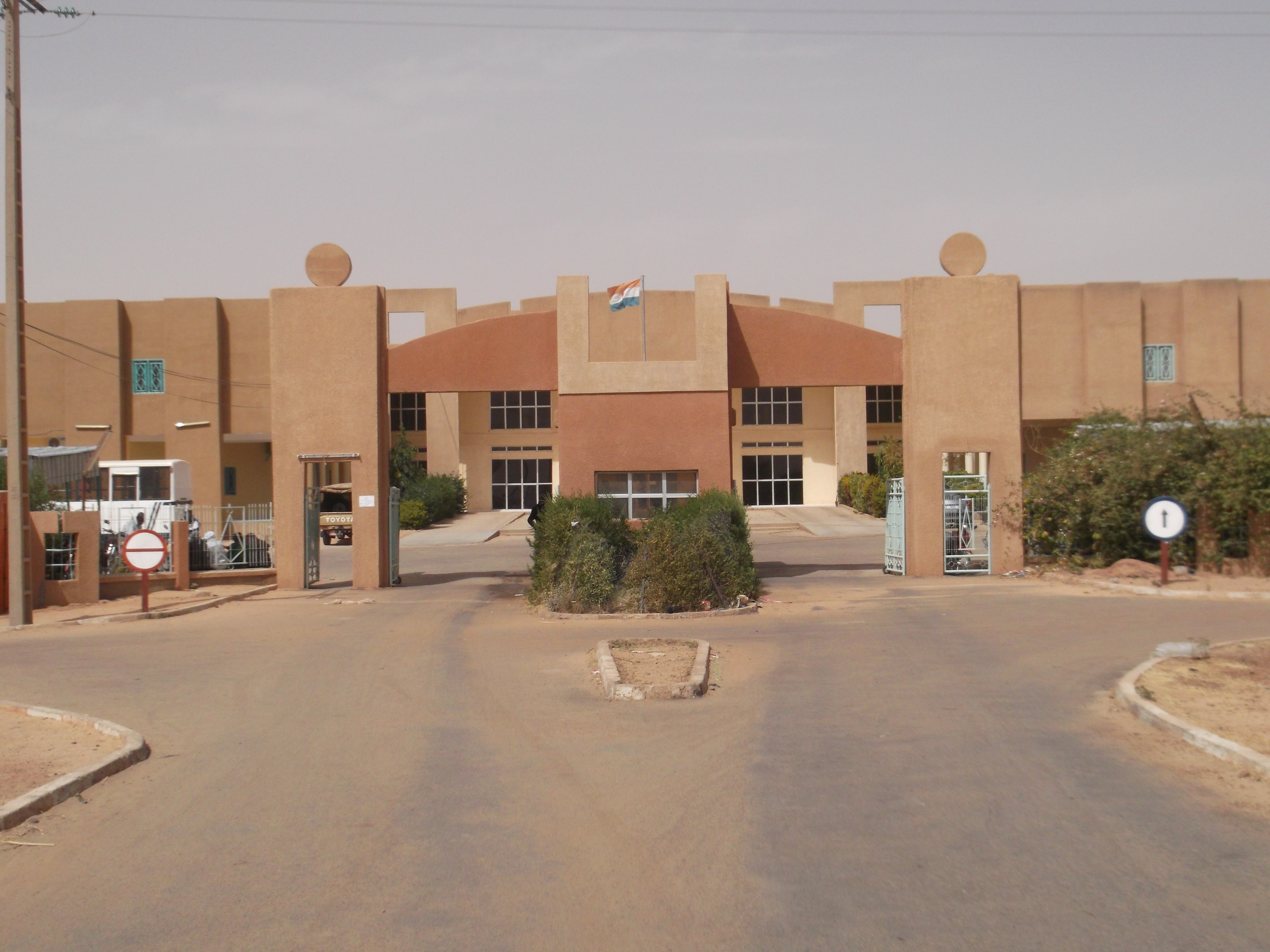
Zinder University

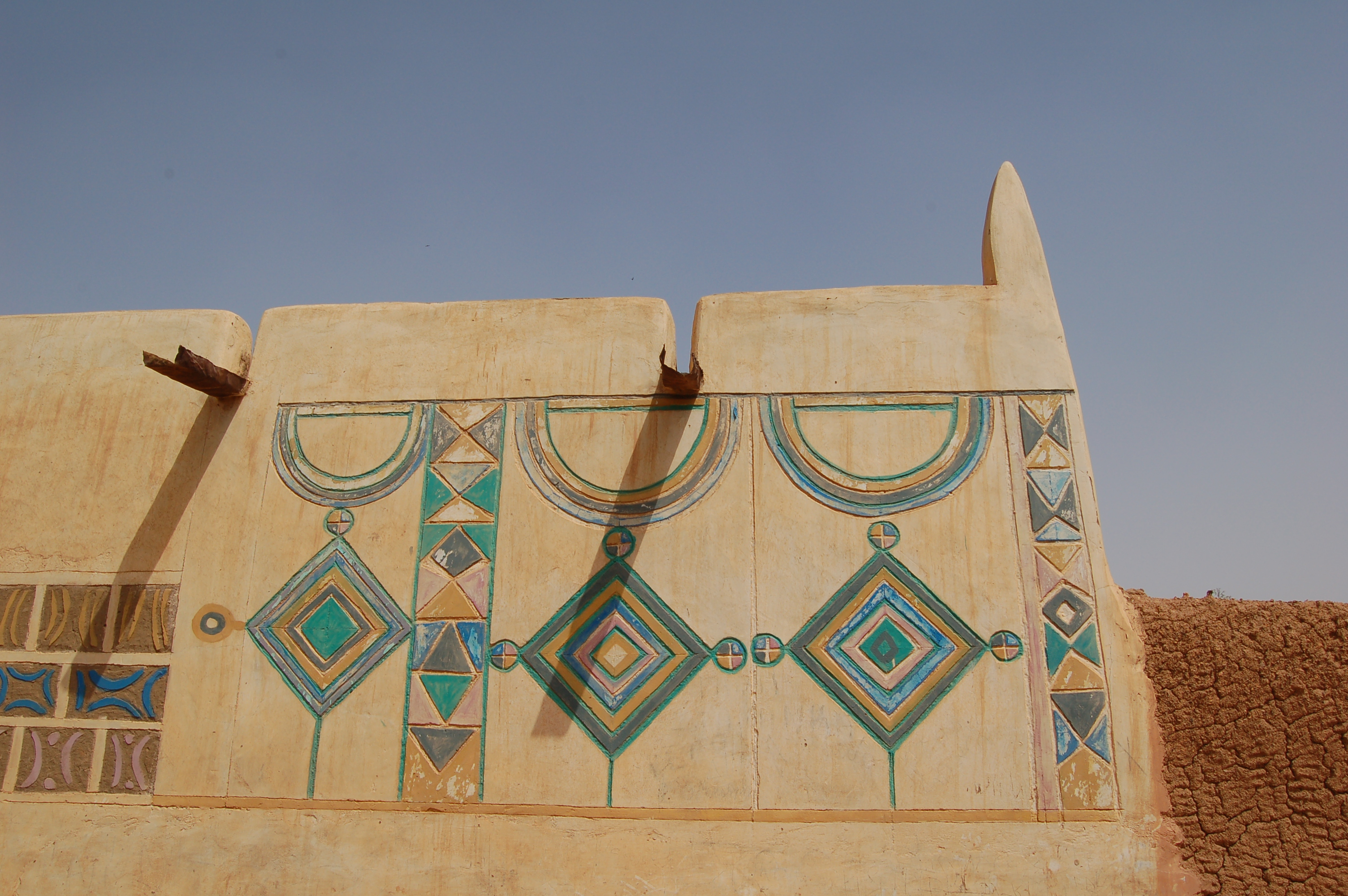
Many buildings in the town are decorated with traditional symbols

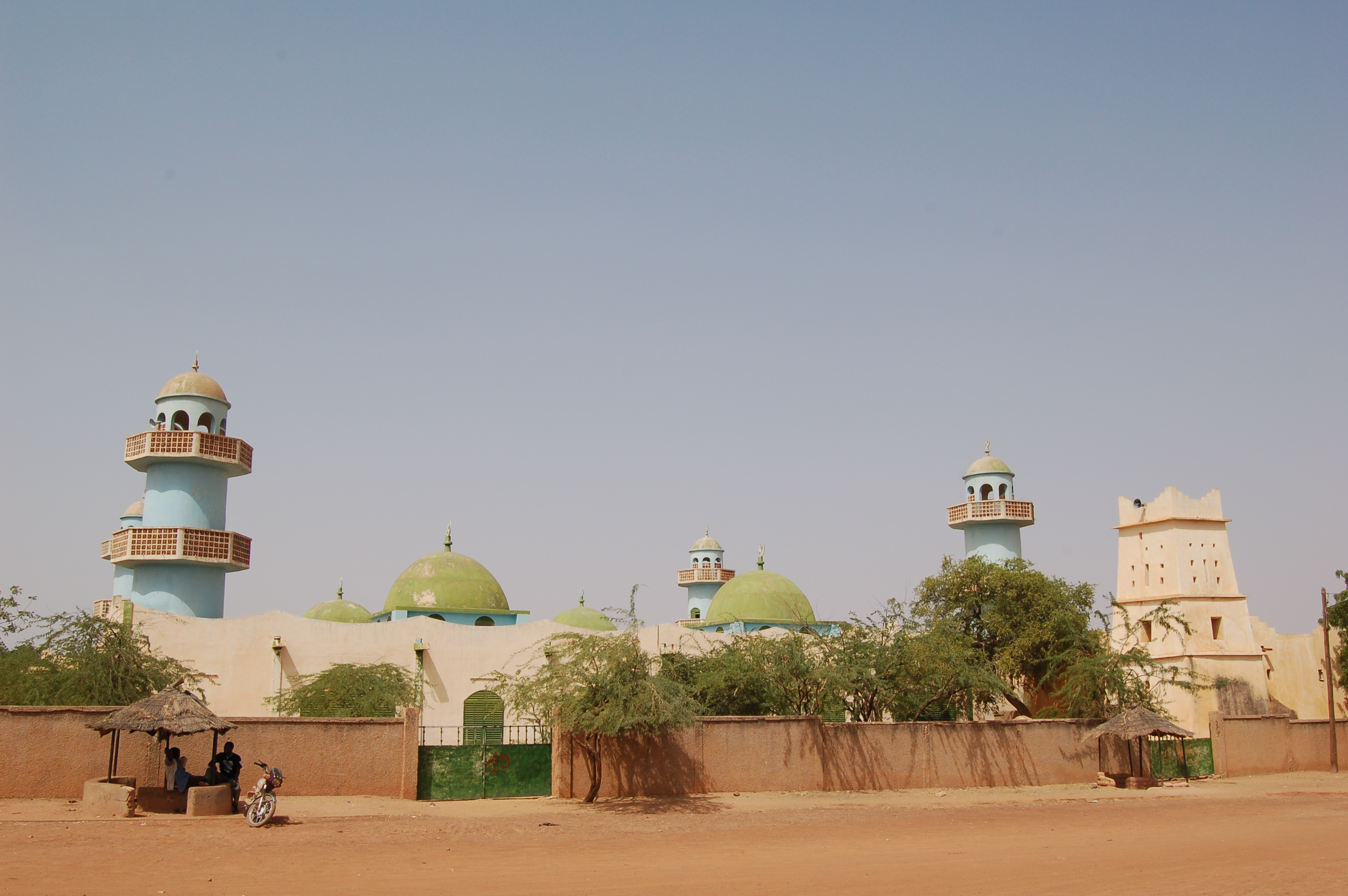
The Grand Mosque in Zinder

== Bibliography ==
- James Decalo. Historical Dictionary of Niger. Scarecrow Press/ Metuchen. NJ – London (1979) ISBN 0-8108-1229-0
- Finn Fuglestad. A History of Niger: 1850–1960. Cambridge University Press (1983) ISBN 0-521-25268-7
- Jolijn Geels. Niger. Bradt UK/ Globe Pequot Press USA (2006) ISBN 978-1-84162-152-4
