= List of Nigerien films =

The following is a sortable list of films produced or shot in Niger.

Year	Title	Director	Genre	Notes
1947	Au pays des mages noirs	Pierre Ponty, Jean Rouch & Jean Sauvy	Documentary	English title: In the Land of the Black Mages
1948	Les magiciens de Wanzerbé	Marcel Griaule & Jean Rouch	Documentary	
1949	La circoncision	Jean Rouch	Documentary	English title: The Circumcision
1949	Initiation à la danse des possédés	Jean Rouch	Documentary	English title: Initiation to the Dance of the Possessed
1950	Chasse à l'hippopotame	Jean Rouch	Documentary	English title: Hippopotamus Chase
1951	Les gens du mil	Jean Rouch	Documentary	English title: The Millet Peoples
1951	Yenendi: les hommes qui font la pluie	Jean Rouch	Documentary	English title: Rainmakers
1959	Les fils de l'eau	Jean Rouch	Documentary	English title: The Sons of Water
1962	Aouré	Moustapha Alassane	Drama short	English title: Wedding Marriage
1962	Le Mil	Jean Rouch	Documentary	English title: Millet
1962	La Pileuse de Mil	Moustapha Alassane	Short	
1962	La bague du roi Koda	Moustapha Alassane	Short	English title: The Ring of King Koda
1964	L'arachide de Santchira	Moustapha Alassane	Short	
1965	La Mort de Gandji	Moustapha Alassane	Animation	English title: The Death of Gandji
1966	Le Retour d'un aventurier	Moustapha Alassane	Drama short	English title: The Return of an Adventurer
1966	Bon Voyage Sim	Moustapha Alassane	Animated short	
1966	Les cow boys sont noirs	Serge Moati	Short	English title: The Cowboys are Black
1966	Dongo Horendi	Jean Rouch		
1967	Malbaza	Moustapha Alassane	Short	
1967	Jaguar	Jean Rouch	Docu-drama	
1967	Daudo Sorko	Jean Rouch		
1969	Cabascabo	Oumarou Ganda	Drama short	
1969	Les contre Bandiers	Moustapha Alassane	Short	
1970	Petit à petit	Jean Rouch	Comedy	
1970	Yenendi de Yantalla	Jean Rouch		
1970	Yan Diga - Ils traverseront des pays comme des jardins	Serge Moati	Drama	English title: Yan Diga - They'll Cross Countries like Gardens
1971	Architectes Ayorou	Jean Rouch	Documentary	
1971	Le Wazzou Polygame	Oumarou Ganda	Drama	
1971	Yenendi di Simiri	Jean Rouch		
1971	Jamyya	Moustapha Alassane	Short	
1971	Tourou et Bitti	Jean Rouch & Lam Dia-Hama	Documentary	
1972	Yenendi de Boukoki	Jean Rouch		
1972	FVVA: Femme, villa, voiture, argent	Moustapha Alassane	Drama	English title: WVCM: Woman, Villa, Car, Money
1972	Abimbola ou Shaki	Moustapha Alassane	Short	
1972	Tanda Singui	Jean Rouch		
1973	Saïtane	Oumarou Ganda	Drama	
1973	Dongo Hori	Jean Rouch		
1973	Siberi	Moustapha Alassane	Short	
1974	Toula ou Le génie des eaux	Moustapha Alassane & Anna Soehring	Drama	English title: Toula or the Genie of the Waters
1974	Cocorico! Monsieur Poulet	Jean Rouch, Damouré Zika, Lam Ibrahim Dia	Comedy	not released until 1977
1974	Soubane	Moustapha Alassane	Short	
1976	L'étoile noire	Djingareye Maïga		English title: The Black Star
1976	Babatou, les trois conseils	Jean Rouch	Drama	English title: Babatou, the Three Tips
1976	Médecines et médecins	Inoussa Ousseini & Jean Rouch	Documentary	English title: Medicine and Doctors
1977	Samba le grand	Moustapha Alassane	Animated short	
1977	Fête des Gandyi Bi à Simiri	Jean Rouch	Documentary	
1977	Badye, le Griot	Inoussa Ousseini & Jean Rouch	Documentary	
1978	Zaboa	Moustapha Alassane	Short	
1979	Nuages noirs	Djingareye Maïga		English title: Black Clouds
1980	L'éxilé	Oumarou Ganda	Drama	English title: The Exile
1980	Wasan kara	Inoussa Ousseini	Documentary short	
1982	Kankamba ou le semeur de discorde	Moustapha Alassane		English title: Kankamba or The Sower of Discord
1982	Si les cavaliers	Mahamane Bakabe		English title: If the Riders
1982	Gourimou	Moustapha Alassane	Short	
1982	Agwane mon Village	Moustapha Alassane	Short	
1983	Aube Noire	Djingareye Maïga		English title:Black Dawn
1983	Petanqui	Kozoloa Yeo	Drama	
1985	Falaw	Mariama Hima	Documentary	
1985	Kokoa	Moustapha Alassane	Animated short	
1985	Baabu Banza	Mariama Hima	Documentary	
1986	Le médecin de Gafire	Mustapha Diop	Drama	English title: The Doctor from Gafire
1986	Toukou	Mariama Hima	Documentary	
1987	Katako	Mariama Hima	Documentary	
1990	Mamy Wata	Mustapha Diop		
1994	Hadiza et Kalia	Mariama Hima	Documentary	
1997	Imuhar, une légende	Jacques Dubuisson	Drama	
1997	Moi fatigué debout, moi couché	Jean Rouch		English title: I'm Tired Standing, Tired Lying Down
2000	Soolo	Moustapha Alassane	Short	
2000	Les Magiciens de l'Ader	Moustapha Alassane	Short	
2001	Agaïssa	Moustapha Alassane	Short	
2003	Tagimba	Moustapha Alassane	Short	
2004	Agadez nomade FM	Christian Lelong & Pierre Mortimore	Documentary	
2005	Al'lèèssi... Une actrice africaine	Rahmatou Keïta	Documentary	
2005	Arlit, deuxième Paris	Idrissou Mora Kpai	Documentary	English title: Arlit, the Second Paris
2006	Le Fleuve Niger se meurt	Adam Aborak Kandine	Short documentary (6 min)	
2008	Au centre de la Terre, des puits et des hommes	Ingrid Patetta	Documentary	English title: In the Centre of the Earth, Wells and Men
2008	La Robe du temps	Malam Saguirou	Documentary	English title: The Robe of Time
2008	Pour le meilleur et pour l'oignon!	Sani Elhadj Magori	Documentary	English title: For the Best and for the Onion!
2010	La danse des Woodabe	Sandrine Loncke	Documentary	English title: The Dance of the Woodabe
2010	Agadez, the Music and the Rebellion	Ron Wyman	Documentary	
2010	Niger '66: A Peace Corps Diary	Judy Irola	Documentary	
2011	Koukan Kourcia (Le cri de la tourterelle)	Sani Elhadj Magori	Documentary	English title: Koukan Kourcia (The Cry of the Dove)
2013	Those Who Veil	Daliso Leslie	Documentary short	
2013	Lokkol. l'école. Alwasi et Aikije vont (aussi) à l'école	Francesco Sincich	Documentary	English title: Lokkol. The School. Alwasi and Aikije (also) go to School
2015	Akounak Tedalat Taha Tazoughai	Christopher Kirkley	Drama	English title: Rain the Color of Blue with a Little Red in It
2016	La Colère dans le vent	Amina Weira	Documentary	English title: Anger in the Wind
2016	Zin'naariya	Rahmatou Keïta	Drama	English title: The Wedding Ring
2017	L'arbre sans fruit	Aïcha Macky	Documentary	English title: The Fruitless Tree
2017	Zerzura (film)	Christopher Kirkley	Docu-drama	
2017	Lokkol 2. Trip to Niamey	Francesco Sincich	Documentary	

== See also ==
- Cinema of Niger
