= Cinema of Niger =

Overview of film production in Niger

- No. of screens: 4 (2011)
  - Per capita: <0.1 per 100,000 (2011)

Produced feature films
- Animated: –

Number of admissions
- Total: 50,010 (2013)
- National films: 3,010 (6.0%)

Gross box office (2011)
- Total: XOF 30 million

The Cinema of Niger began in the 1940s with the ethnographical documentary of French director Jean Rouch, before growing to become one of the most active national film cultures in Francophone Africa in the 1960s-70s with the work of filmmakers such as Oumarou Ganda, Moustapha Alassane and Gatta Abdourahamne. The industry has slowed somewhat since the 1980s, though films continue to be made in the country, with notable directors of recent decades including Mahamane Bakabe, Inoussa Ousseini, Mariama Hima, Moustapha Diop and Rahmatou Keïta. Unlike neighbouring Nigeria, with its thriving Hausa and English-language film industries, most Nigerien films are made in French with Francophone countries as their major market, whilst action and light entertainment films from Nigeria or dubbed western films fill most Nigerien theatres.

== 1940s-1950s: Colonial beginnings ==
The first Nigerien films were made in the 1940s, when Niger was still under French rule as part of French West Africa. Jean Rouch, a French ethnographic filmmaker, is generally considered 'the father of Nigerien film'. Arriving initially as an engineer in 1941, Rouch remained in Niger after independence, and mentored a generation of Nigerien filmmakers and actors, including Damouré Zika, Moustapha Alassane and Oumarou Ganda. Rouch made his first film in Niger in 1947, with the short documentary Au Pays des Mages Noirs (In the Land of Black Mages), going on to make a number of similar short ethnographic documentaries, such as Les Magiciens de Wanzarbé (1948), Initiation à la danse des possédés (Initiation to the Dance of the Possessed; 1949) and Chasse à l'hippopotame (Hippopotamus Chase; 1950).

During the 1950s, Rouch began to produce longer, narrative films. In 1954 he filmed Damouré Zika in Jaguar as a young Songhai man travelling for work to the Gold Coast (modern Ghana). Filmed as a silent ethnographic piece, Zika helped re-edit the film into a feature-length movie which stood somewhere between documentary and fiction, and provided dialog and commentary for a 1967 release. In 1957 Rouch directed in Côte d'Ivoire Moi un noir with the young Nigerian filmmaker Oumarou Ganda.

== 1960s-1970s: A golden age of Nigerien film ==
Niger gained independence from France in August 1960; the 60s saw the development of the careers of two of the most prominent Nigerien film-makers - Moustapha Alassane and Oumarou Ganda. Alassane's first film was the short Aouré (Wedding Marriage; 1962), about a Zarma marriage. He went on to make several short films, as well a number of animations, having been trained in animated cinematography in Canada. His 1966 animation La Mort de Gandji won the "Prix de Dessin" at the first Festival Mondial des Arts Nègres in Dakar. Alassane also made number of longer films, such as Le Retour d'un aventurier (The Return of an Adventurer; 1966), the social satire FVVA: Femme, villa, voiture, argent (WVCM: Woman, Villa, Car, Money; 1972) and Toula ou Le génie des eaux (Toula or the Genie of the Waters; 1974).

Oumarou Ganda's first film was the Zarma language Cabascabo, based on his experience serving in French Indochina; it became the first African selection at the Cannes Film Festival, and went on to win the Grand Jury Prize at the 1969 6th Moscow International Film Festival Ganda was one of the dominating figures of early African cinema, demonstrated by his awards at the Panafrican Film and Television Festival of Ouagadougou (FESPACO), a festival he and other Nigeriens helped to found. Ganda's Le Wazzou polygame (1971) won the first prize (Étalon de Yennenga) at the 1972 FESPACO, while he also won the "Congratulations of the Jury" at the 4th (1973). His 1973 film Saïtane won a "Special mention" at the fifth FESPACO; this festival now presents an "Oumarou Ganda Prize", given for the best first film.

Another Nigerien filmmaker of this period was Gatta Abdourahamne; in 1979 he won the Caméra d'or at FESPACO for his film Gossi. In the same year he won the Screenwriters Award for La Case at the UNESCO festival in Nairobi, Kenya. Another Nigerien director whose career began in this period was Djingarey Maïga (L'étoile noire, 1976; Nuages noirs, 1979).

Jean Rouch, who had stayed in Niger following independence, also continued to produce drama films in this period, including Petit à petit (Little by Little; 1971), Cocorico! Monsieur Poulet (Cocka-doodle-doo Mr. Chicken; 1974) and Babatu (1976), as well as continuing to make ethnographic shorts.

== 1980s-present: Decline and growth ==
Since the 1980s Nigerien film-making has slowed somewhat, in part due to weakening state sector financing, as well as due to the growth of lighter action and romance films, especially the Hausa language film industry of neighbouring Nigeria. Moustapha Alassane, who died in 2015, continued to produce films (such as Kokoa, 1985; Les Magiciens de l'Ader, 2000) up until the early 2000s. Oumarou Ganda made his last film L'éxilé in 1980, before his death in 1981. Other notable film-makers from the period include Inoussa Ousseini (Wasan Kara, 1980), Moustapha Diop (Le médecin de Gafire, 1986; Mamy Wata, 1990) and Mahamane Bakabe (Si les cavaliers, 1982). In the 1980s-90s Mariama Hima, the first female director from Niger, won acclaim for documentaries, such as Baabu Banza (1985), Katako (1987) and Hadiza et Kalia (1994); after a number of high-profile cultural roles she later became ambassador to France.

In 1994, Nigerien producer/director Ousmane Ilbo Mahamane founded the Niamey African Film Meeting (Rencontres du cinéma africain de Niamey, RECAN) as a biennial festival without prizes and also a centre for film-making and film studies.

In 2004 Jean Rouch was killed in a car crash in Niamey whilst he was on his way to a Nigerien film festival. He had made his last film, Moi fatigué debout, moi couché (I'm Tired Standing, Tired Lying Down), in 1997.

The first Nigerien Tuareg feature film, Akounak Teggdalit Taha Tazoughai (Rain the Color of Blue with a Little Red in It), was released in 2015 and stars the musician Mdou Moctar; it was directed by American musicologist Christopher Kirkley. It tells the story of a struggling musician from Agadez and is loosely based on Purple Rain. Other notable figures working in the contemporary Nigerien film industry include the actress Zalika Souley, who won the Insignes du mérite culturel at the 1990 Carthage Film Festival and the directors Rahmatou Keïta (Al'lèèssi... Une actrice africaine, 2005; The Wedding Ring (2016 film), a.k.a. Zin'naariya, 2016), Malam Saguirou (La Robe du temps, 2008) and Sani Elhadj Magori (Pour le meilleur et pour l'oignon!, 2008; Koukan Kourcia (Le cri de la tourterelle), 2011).

== List of Nigerien films ==
See: List of Nigerien films
