= List of FESPACO award winners =

Panafrican Film and Television Festival of Ouagadougou (FESPACO) is an important biannual African film festival. Its most prestigious award is the Étalon d'or de Yennenga (Golden Stallion of Yennenga), named in reference to the mythical founder of the Mossi empire. The Étalon d'or de Yennenga is awarded to the African fictional or documentary feature film that best represents "Africa's realities". Originally the festival handed out just one Étalon de Yennenga, however in 2005 it introduced the Étalon d'argent de Yennenga (Silver Stallion of Yennenga) and the Étalon de bronze de Yennenga (Bronze Stallion of Yennenga) and renamed the original award Étalon d'or de Yennenga.

Other awards include the Oumarou Ganda Prize named after the Nigerien film director and in recognition of the best debut film, and the Paul Robeson Prize for the best film by a director of the African diaspora.

== 1st Semaine du cinéma africain (1969) ==
Festival was non-competitive. Eighteen African films were shown from: Senegal, Ivory Coast, Upper Volta (Burkina Faso), Niger, Benin, Congo and Cameroon selection also included five movies from France and Niderlands.

The selection included among others: Borom Sarret by Ousmane Sambene (Senegal), La Noire de... by Ousmane Sambene (Senegal), Le Retour d'un aventurier by Moustapha Alassane (Niger), La Bague du roi Koda by Moustapha Alassane (Niger), Aoure by Moustapha Alassane (Niger), Cabascabo by Oumarou Ganda (Niger), Black Orpheus by Marcel Camus (France / Brazil), Moro Naba by Jean Rouch (France / Upper Volta), Bataille sur le grand fleuve by Jean Rouch (France / Niger), Jaguar by Jean Rouch (France / Niger), Bambo by members of Film Club of Lycée Technique de Bamako (Mali), Mouna ou le rêve d'un artiste by Henri Duparc (Ivory Coast) and Kaka Yo by Sébastien Kamba (Republic of Congo).

== 2nd Semaine du cinéma africain (1970) ==
Festival was non-competitive. 37 films were shown from: Senegal, Ivory Coast, Upper Volta (Burkina Faso), Niger, Benin, Congo, Cameroon, Tunisia, Algieria and Ghana.

The selection included among others: Mandabi by Ousmane Sembène (Senegal),The Woman with the Knife by Timité Bassori (Ivory Coast) and La Voie by Mohamed Slim Riad (Algeria).

== 3rd FESPACO (1972) ==
- First Prize (Étalon de Yennenga): Le Wazzou polygame by Oumarou Ganda (Niger).
- Second Prize (Prix spécial d'authenticité): Hydre Dyama by Moussa Kemoko Diakité (Guinea).
- Third Prize: L'Opium et le Bâton by Ahmed Rachedi (Algeria).
- Consolation prize: Pour ceux qui savent by Tidiane Aw (Senegal).
- First prize - Best Short Film: Moseka by Roger Kwami Zinga (Zaïre).
- Second prize - Best Short Film: Sur le sentier du requiem by Pierre-Marie Dong (Gabon).

== 4th FESPACO (1973) ==
- First prize (Étalon de Yennenga): Les Mille et une mains by Souheil Ben Barka (Morocco).
- Prize of the most authentic African film (Prix de l'authenticité africaine): Identité by Pierre-Marie Dong (Gabon).
- Prize of the 7th art: Décembre by Mohamed Lakdar Hamina (Algeria).
- Consolation Prize: Le Sang des parias by Mamadou Djim Kola (Upper Volta).
- Best Short Film: Accident by Benoit-Maurice Ramampy (Madagascar).
- Congratulations of the Jury: Oumarou Ganda (Niger).

== 5th FESPACO (1976) ==
- First prize (Étalon de Yennenga): Muna Moto by Dikongue Pipa (Cameroon)
- Second Prize: Vent du Sud by Mohamed Slim Riadh (Algeria) and Ndiangane by Mahama Johnson Traoré (Senegal).
- Third Prize: Sur le chemin de la réconciliation by René-Bernard Yonli (Upper Volta)
- Prize of the 7th art: L'Héritage by Mohamed Bouhamari (Algeria)
- Jury Prize: Sejnane by Abdellatif Ben Ammar (Tunisia) and Nationalité immigrée by Sydney Sokhona (Mauritania)
- Special mention: Lettre paysanne by Safi Faye (Senegal) and Saïtane by Oumarou Ganda (Niger).
- Another special mention: first participation of Ghana.

== 6th FESPACO (1979) ==
- First prize (Étalon de Yennenga): Baara by Souleymane Cissé (Mali).
- Prize of the most authentic African film: Soleil des hyènes by Ridha Behi (Tunisia).
- Prize of the 7th art: Alyam Alyam by Ahmed El Mahanouni (Morocco).
- Best Short Film : La Boîte dans le désert by Brahim Tsaki (Algeria).
- Special Consolation prize: Yik-Yan by Hamidou-Benoit Ouedraogo (Upper Volta).

== 7th FESPACO (1981) ==
- First prize (Étalon de Yennenga): Djeli by Fadika Kramo Lanciné (Côte d'Ivoire).
- Prize of the most authentic African film: La Chapelle by Jean-Michel Tchissoukou (Congo).
- Prize of the 7th art : West Indies by Med Hondo (Mauritania).
- Oumarou Ganda Prize: Love Brewed in the African Pot by Kwaw Ansah (Ghana).
- Best Short Film: Poko by Idrissa Ouedraogo (Upper Volta).

== 8th FESPACO (1983) ==
- First prize (Étalon de Yennenga): Finyè by Souleymane Cissé (Mali)
- Oumarou Ganda Prize: Pawéogo (L'Émigrant) by Kollo Sanou (Upper Volta)
- Best Short Film: Certificat d'indigence by Moussa Bathyli (Senegal)
- Best Actress: Rosine Yanogo in Wend Kuuni (Upper Volta)
- Best Actor: Mohamed Abachi in Le Coiffeur du quartier des pauvres (Morocco)
- Best Screenplay: L'Ombre de la terre by Taïeb Louhichi (Tunisia)
- Best Cinematography: Zo Kwe Zo by Joseph Akouissonne (Central African Republic)
- Golden Camera: Issaka Thiombiano and Sékou Ouedraogo in Wend Kuuni (Upper Volta)
- Best Operator: L'Ombre de la terre by Taïeb Louhichi (Tunisia)

== 9th FESPACO (1985) ==
- First prize (Étalon de Yennenga): Histoire d'une rencontre by Brahim Tsaki (Algeria)
- Prize of the 7th art: Nelisita by Ruy Duarte (Angola)
- Oumarou Ganda Prize: Jours de tourmente by Paul Zoumbara (Burkina Faso)
- Best Short Film: Mariaamu's Wedding by Nangaoma Ngoge (Tanzania)
- Best Original Score: Pierre Akendengue for Les Coopérants (Cameroon)
- Public Award: Rue Cases-nègres by Euzhan Palcy (France)

== 10th FESPACO (1987) ==
- First prize (Étalon de Yennenga): Sarraounia by Med Hondo (Mauritania)
- Prize of the 7th art: Le Choix by Idrissa Ouedraogo (Burkina Faso)
- Oumarou Ganda Prize: Nyamanton by Cheick Oumar Sissoko (Mali)
- Best Short Film: Le Singe fou by Joseph Koumba (Gabon)
- Best Music: Le Choix by Idrissa Ouedraogo (Burkina Faso)
- Public Award: Nyamanton by Cheick Oumar Sissoko (Mali)

== 11th FESPACO (1989) ==
- First prize (Étalon de Yennenga): Héritage... Africa by Kwaw Ansah (Ghana)
- Oumarou Ganda Prize: Mortu Nega by Flora Gomes (Guinea-Bissau)
- Best Short Film: La Geste de Segou (Segu janjo) by Mambaye Coulibaly (Mali)
- Paul Robeson Prize: Ori by Raquel Gerber (Brazil)
- Best Actress: Bia Gomes in Mortu Nega (Guinea-Bissau)
- Best Actor: Kofi Bucknor in Héritage... Africa (Ghana)
- Best Screenplay: Zan Boko by Gaston Kaboré (Burkina Faso)
- Best Cinematography: La Citadelle by Mohamed Chouikh (Algeria)
- Best Original Score: Francis Bebey for Yaaba (Burkina Faso)
- Special mention for Sound Editing: Testament by John Akomfrah (Ghana)
- Public Award: Yaaba by Idrissa Ouedraogo (Burkina Faso)
- Voice of Hope Award: Sidiki Bakaba in Les Guérisseurs (Ivory Coast)

== 12th FESPACO (1991) ==
- First prize (Étalon de Yennenga): Tilaï by Idrissa Ouedraogo (Burkina Faso)
- Prix Oumarou Ganda: Ta Dona of Adama Drabo (Mali)
- Prize of the best short film: La Transe (El Hadhra) of Moncef Dhouib (Tunisia)
- Prize of the best documentary film: Yiri Kan of Issiaka Konaté (Burkina Faso)
- Paul Robeson Prize: Almacita Di Desolato by Felix de Rooy (The Netherlands)
- Special mention (Paul Robeson Prize): Twilight City by Reece Auguiste (United Kingdom)
- Another special mention: Sango Malo by Bassek Ba Kobhio (Cameroon)
- Best Actress: Mariatou Kouyaté in Bamunan (Mali)
- Best Actor: Balla Moussa Keita in Sere (Guinea)
- Best Screenplay: Louss by Rachid Benhadj (Algeria)
- Best Cinematography: Jit by Michael Raeburn (Zimbabwe)
- Best Original Score: Abdallah Ibrahim for Tilaï (Burkina Faso)
- Best Sound Editing: Leila, ma raison by Taëb Louhichi (Tunisia)

== 13th FESPACO (1993) ==
- First Prize (Étalon de Yennenga): Au nom du Christ by Gnoan Roger M'Bala (Côte d'Ivoire)
- Oumarou Ganda Prize: Gito l'ingrat by Léonce N'Gabo (Burundi)
- Best Short film: Denko by Mohamed Camara (Guinea)
- Best Documentary Film: Femmes d'Alger by Kamal Dehane (Algeria)
- Jury Prize: Les étrangers by Djim Kola (Burkina Faso)
- Jury Prize (Short Film): Boxumalen by Amet Diallo (Senegal)
- Paul Robeson Prize: Lumumba, la mort d'un prophète by Raoul Peck (Haiti)
- Best Actress: Maysa Marta in Les yeux bleus de Yonta (Guinea-Bissau)
- Best Actor: Joseph Kumbela in Gito l'ingrat (Burundi)
- Best Screenplay: Contre le gouvernement by Atef el-Tayeb (Egypt)
- Best Film Editing: Bezness by Nouri Bouzid (Tunisia)
- Best Cinematography: Sankofa by Haïlé Guerima (Burkina Faso/Ghana)
- Best Original Score: Cheick Tidiane Seck for Yelema (Mali)
- Best Sound Editing: Quartier Mozart by Jean-Pierre Bekolo (Cameroon)

== 14th FESPACO (1995) ==
- First Prize (Étalon de Yennenga): Guimba the Tyrant by Cheick Oumar Sissoko (Mali)
- Best Short Film: Le franc by Djibril Diop Mambéty (Senegal)
- Best Actor: Mohamed Ali Allalou in Youcef (Algeria)
- Best Actress: Yousra in Mercedes (Egypt)
- Jury Prize: A la recherche du mari de ma femme by M.A. Tazi (Morocco)
- Special Mention: Le grand Blanc de Lambaréné by Bassek Ba Kobhio (Cameroon)
- Paul Robeson Prize: L'exil de Behanzin by Guy Deslauriers (Martinique)
- Oumarou Ganda Prize: Keïta by Dany Kouyaté (Burkina Faso)
- Best Costumes and Decoration: Guimba by Cheick Oumar Sissoko (Mali)
- Best Editing: Kahena Attia (Tunisia)
- Best Screenplay: Khaled Al-Haggar for Ahlam Saghira (Egypt)

== 15th FESPACO (1997) ==
- First Prize (Étalon de Yennenga): Buud Yam by Gaston Kaboré (Burkina Faso)
- Best Short Film (Fiction): Bouzié by Jacques Trabi (Côte d'Ivoire)
- Best Actor: Belkacem Hadjadj in Machaho (Algeria)
- Best Actress: Aminata Ousmane Maïga in Faraw, mère de sables (Mali)
- Jury Prize: Taafe Fanga by Adama Drabo (Mali)
- Paul Robeson Prize: The Last Angel of History by John Akomfrah (United Kingdom)
- Oumarou Ganda Prize: Miel et cendres by Nadia Fares Anliker (Tunisia)
- Best Editing: Kahena Attia for Miel et cendres (Tunisia)
- Best Screenplay: Merzak Allouache for Salut Cousin! (Algeria)
- Best Soundtrack: Le complot d'Aristote by Jean-Pierre Bekolo (Zimbabwe)
- Best Original Score: Leao Lopes for Ilheu, de contenda (Cape Verde)
- Best Cinematography: Tableau Ferraille by Moussa Sene Absa (Senegal)

== 16th FESPACO (1999) ==
- First Prize (Étalon de Yennenga): Pièces d'identités by Mwezé Ngangura (Democratic Republic of the Congo)
- Special Mention: La vie sur terre by Abderrahmane Sissako (Mauritania)
- Best Actor: Fats Bookholane in Chikin Biznis (South Africa)
- Best Actress: Dominique Mesa in Pièces d'identités (Democratic Republic of the Congo)
- Paul Robeson Prize: Sucre amer by Christian Lara (Guadeloupe, France)
- Paul Robeson Prize (Short Film): Blue Note by Rahdi Taylor (United States)
- Best Editing: Nadia Ben Rachid for La vie sur terre (Mauritania)
- Best Set Design: F. Baba Keïta for La Genèse (Mali)
- Best Original Score: Wasis Diop for Silmandé (Burkina Faso)
- Best Sound Editing: Tawsi Thabet for Lalla Hobby (Morocco)
- Best Cinematography: Mustapha Ben Mihoub for L’Arche du désert (Algeria)
- Best Screenplay: Mtutuzeli Matshoba for Chikin Biznis (South Africa)
- Oumarou Ganda Prize: Fools by Ramadan Suleiman (South Africa)
- Best Short Film: On The Edge by Newton Aduaka (Nigeria)
- Best Short Film - Special Mention: Souko, cinématographe en carton by Issiaka Konaté (Burkina Faso)
- Best Documentary Film: Hot Irons by Andrew Dosunwu (Nigeria)
- Best Documentary Film - Special Mention: Sarah Maladoror ou la nostalgie de l'utopie by Anne-Laure Folly (Burkina Faso)

== 17th FESPACO (2001) ==
- First Prize (Étalon de Yennenga): Ali Zaoua by Nabil Ayouch (Morocco)
- Jury Prize: Sia, le rêve du python by Dani Kouyté (Burkina Faso)
- Oumarou Ganda Prize: Rage by Newton I. Aduaka (Nigeria)
- Paul Robeson Prize: Lumumba by Raoul Peck (Haiti)
- Best Actor: Makéna Diop (Sénégal) in Battu by Cheick Oumar Sissoko (Mali)
- Best Actress: Albertine N’Guessan in Adanggaman by Roger Gnoan M'Bala (Côte d'Ivoire)
- Best Cinematography: Mohamed Soudani for Adanggaman (Algeria)
- Best Screenplay: Dolè by Imunga Ivanga (Gabon)
- Best Sets: Nacer Ktari and Larbi Ben Ali for Sois mon amie by Nacer Ktari (Tunisia)
- Best Cinematography: Nacer Ktari and Larbi Ben Ali for Sois mon amie by Nacer Ktari (Tunisia)
- Best Sound Editing: Fawzi Thabet for Siestes Grenadines by Mahmoud Ben Mahmoud (Tunisia)
- Best Original Score: Wasis Diop for Les Couilles de l’éléphant (Gabon)
- Best Short Film (Fiction): Bintou by Fanta Régina Nacro (Burkina Faso)

== 18th FESPACO (2003) ==
- First Prize (Étalon de Yennenga): Heremakono by Abderrahmane Sissako (Mauritania)
- Jury Prize: Kabala by Assane Kouyaté (Mali)
- Jury Prize (Short Film): A drink in the passage by Zola Maseko (South Africa)
- Oumarou Ganda Prize: L'Afrance by Alain Gomis (France, Senegal)
- Best Actor: Cheick Doukouré in Paris selon Moussa (Guinea)
- Best Actress: Awatef Jendoubi in Fatma (Tunisia)
- Best Cinematography: Abraham Haile Biru in Abouna (Chad)
- Best Screenplay: Assana Kouyaté for Kabala (Mali)
- Best Editing: Ronelle Loots for Promised Land (South Africa)
- Best Sound Editing: Hachim Joulak for Fatma (Tunisia)
- Best Original Score: Wasis Diop & Loy Ehrlich for Le prix du pardon (Senegal)
- Best Set Decoration: Joseph Kpobly for Heremakono (Mauritania)
- Best Short Film: Source d’histoire by Adama Rouamba (Burkina Faso)

== 19th FESPACO (2005) ==
- First Prize (Étalon d'or de Yennenga): Drum by Zola Maseko (South Africa)
- Second Prize: La Chambre Noire by Hassan Benjelloun (Morocco)
- Third Prize: Tassuma by Daniel Kollo Sanou (Burkina Faso)
- Oumarou Ganda Prize: Max and Mona by Teddy Mattera (South Africa)
- Paul Robeson Prize: Beah: A Black Woman Speaks by Lisa Gay Hamilton (United States)
- Best Short Film: L’autre mal by Tahirou Tasséré Ouédraogo (Burkina Faso)
- Best Actor: Sid Ali Kouiret in Les suspects (Algeria)
- Best Actress: Pamela Nomvete in Lettre d'amour zoulou (South Africa)
- Best Screenplay: La nuit de la vérité by Fanta Régina Nacro (Burkina Faso)
- Best Cinematography: Un heros by Zézé Gamboa (Angola)
- Best Sound Editing: El Manara by Belkacem Hadjadj (Algeria)
- Best Set Design: Drum by Zola Maseko (South Africa)
- Best Original Score: Sékouba Bambino Diabaté for Sous la clarté de la lune (Burkina Faso)
- Best Editing: Le Prince by Mohamed Zran (Tunisia)

== 20th FESPACO (2007) ==
- First Prize (Étalon d'or de Yennenga): Ezra by Newton Aduaka (Nigeria)
- Second Prize: Les Saignantes by Jean Pierre Bekolo (Cameroon)
- Third Prize: Daratt (Saison Seche) by Mahamat Saleh Haroun (Chad)
- Oumarou Ganda Prize: Barakat! by Djamila Sahraoui (Algeria)
- Paul Robeson Prize: Le President a-t-il le sida by Arnold Antonin (Haiti)
- Best Documentary: Ejido, La loi du profit by Rhalib Jawad (Morocco)
- Best Short Film: Menged by Daniel Taye Workou (Ethiopia)
- Best Actor: Lotfi Abdelli in Making Off (Tunisia)
- Best Actress: Adèle Ado & Calmel Dorelia in Les saignantes (Cameroon)
- Best Screenplay: Barakat! by Djamila Sahraoui (Algeria)
- Best Cinematography: Daratt (Saison Seche) by Mahamat Saleh Haroun (Chad)
- Best Editing: Nouri Bouzid for Making Off (Tunisia)
- Best Original Score: Djamila Sahraoui for Barakat! (Algeria)
- Best Sound Editing: L'ombre de Liberty by Imunga Ivanga (Gabon)

== 21st FESPACO (2009) ==
- First Prize (Étalon d'or de Yennenga): Teza by Haile Gerima (Ethiopia)
- Second Prize: Nothing but the truth by John Kani (South Africa)
- Third Prize: Mascarades by Lyes Salem (Algeria)
- Oumarou Ganda Prize: Le fauteuil by Missa Hebié (Burkina Faso)
- Paul Robeson Prize: La passion d'un pays by Arnold Antonin (Haiti)
- Best Documentary: Nos lieux interdits by Kilani Leila (Morocco)
- Best Short Film: Sektou (Ils se sont tus...) by Benaissa Khaled (Algeria)
- Best Actor: Rapulana Seiphemo in Jerusalema by Ralph Ziman (South Africa)
- Best Actress: Sana Mouziane in Les Jardins de Samira by Latif Lahlou (Morocco)
- Best Screenplay: L'Absence by Mama Keita (Guinea)
- Best Photography: Jerusalema by Ralph Ziman (South Africa)
- Best Editing: Jerusalema by Ralph Ziman (South Africa)
- Best Set: Wadaan Oummahat (Adieu Mères) by Mohamed Ismaïl (Morocco)
- Best Music: Wadaan Oummahat (Adieu Mères) by Mohamed Ismaïl (Morocco)
- TV and Video Prize: When we were black by Khalo Matabane (South Africa)

== 22nd FESPACO (2011) ==
- First Prize (Étalon d'or de Yennenga): Pegasus by Mouftakir Mohamed (Marrocos)
- Second Prize: A Screaming Man by Mahamat Saleh Haroun (Chad)
- Third Prize: The Ideal Guy by Owell Brown (Costa do Marfim)
- Oumarou Ganda Prize: Our foreign by Sarah Bouyain (Burkina Faso)
- Paul Robeson Prize: The Loves of a zombie by Arnold Antonin (Haiti)
- Best Documentary: Oh whites by Fatima Ouattara (Burkina Faso)

== 23rd FESPACO (2013) ==
- First Prize (Étalon d'or de Yennenga): Tey (Today) by Alain Gomis (Senegal)
- Second Prize: Yema by Djamila Sahraoui (Algeria)
- Third Prize: La Pirogue by Moussa Touré (Senegal)
- Paul Robeson Prize: Le Bonheur d'Elza by Mariette Monpierre (Guadeloupe).
- Best First Feature Film: Les Enfants De Toumaron by Harrikrisna Anenden and Sharvan Anenden (Mauritius)
- Best Actor: Saul Williams in Tey by Alain Gomis (Senegal)
- Best Actress: Mariam Ouedraogo in Moi Zaphira by Apolline Traore (Burkina Faso)
- Best Feature Documentary: Meme Pas Mal by Nadia El Fani (Tunisia)
- Best Short Film: Les Souliers de l'Aid by Anis Lasoued (Tunisia)

== 24th FESPACO (2015) ==
- First Prize (Étalon d'or de Yennenga): Fievres by Hicham Ayouch (Morocco)
- Second Prize: Fadhma N'Soumer by Belkacem Hadjadj (Algeria)
- Third Prize: L'oeil du cyclone (Eye of the Storm) by Sékou Traoré (Burkina Faso)
- Paul Robeson Prize: Morbayassa, le serment de Koumb by Cheikh Fantamady Camara (Guinée-Conakry)
- Best First Feature Film: L'oeil du cyclone by Sékou Traoré (Burkina Faso)
- Best Actor: Assande Fargas in L'oeil du cyclone by Sékou Traoré (Burkina Faso)
- Best Actress: Maïmouna Ndiaye in L'oeil du cyclone by Sékou Traoré (Burkina Faso)
- Best Feature Documentary: Miners Shot Down by Rehad Desai (South Africa)
- Best Short Film: Zakaria by Leyla Bouzid (Tunisia)

== 25th FESPACO (2017) ==
- First Prize (Étalon d'or de Yennenga): Félicité by Alain Gomis (Sénégal)
- Second Prize: A Mile in My Shoes by Saïd Khallaf (Morocco)
- Third Prize: L'orage africain – Un continent sous influence by Sylvestre Amoussou (Bénin)
- Paul Robeson Prize: Frontières by Apolline Traoré (Burkina Faso)
- Best First Feature Film: Le Puits Mohamed Yacine Belhadji by Lotfi Bouchouchi (Algeria)
- Best Actor: Ibrahim Koma in Wùlu by Daouda Coulibaly (Mali)
- Best Actress: Noufissa Benchehida in A la recherche du pouvoir perdu by Mohammed Ahed Bensouda (Morocco)
- Best Feature Documentary: Kemtiyu, Séex Anta (Kemtiyu, Cheikh Anta) by Ousmane William Mbaye (Sénégal)
- Best Short Film: Hymenee by Violaine Maryam Blanche Bellet (Maroc)

== 26th FESPACO (2019) ==
- First Prize (Étalon d'or de Yennenga): The Mercy of the Jungle by Joel Karekezi (Rwanda)
- Second Prize: Karma by Khaled Youssef (Egypt)
- Third Prize: Fatwa by Mahmoud Ben Mahmoud (Tunisia)
- Paul Robeson Prize: Meu amigo Fela (My Friend Fela) by Joel Zito Araujo (Brazil)
- Best First Feature Film: Until the End of Time by Yasmine Chouikh (Algeria)
- Best Actor: Marc Zinga in The Mercy of the Jungle by Joel Karekezi (Rwanda)
- Best Actress: Samantha Mugatsia in Rafiki by Wanuri Kahiu (Kenya)
- Best Feature Documentary: Le loup d'or de Baolé by Aïcha Boro (Burkina Faso)
- Best Short Film: Black Mamba by Amel Guellaty (Tunisia)

== 27th FESPACO (2021) ==
- First Prize (Étalon d'or de Yennenga): The Gravedigger's Wife by Ahmed Khadar (Somalia)
- Second Prize: Freda by Gessica Généus (Haiti)
- Third Prize: A Story of Love and Desire by Leyla Bouzid (Tunisia)
- Best Actor: Alassane Sy in Baamum Nafi by Mamadou Dia (Senegal)
- Best Actress: Zainab Jah in Farewell Amor by Ekwa Msangi (Tanzania)
- Best decor: Night Of The Kings by Philippe Lacote (Ivory Coast)
- Best Editing: Souad by Amin Ayten (Egypt)
- Best screenplay: Nameless by Mutiganda Wa Nkunda (Rwanda)
- Image prize: This is not a burial, it is a resurrection by Lemohang Jeremiah Mosese (Lesotho)
- Sound Award: Freda by Gessica Geneus (Haiti)
- Best Music: The Gravedigger's Wife by Ahmed Khadar (Somalia)
- Gold standard documentary feature film: Garderie Nocturne by Moumouni Sanou (Burkina Faso)
- Silver standard documentary feature film: Marcher sur l’eau by Aissa Maiga (Senegal-Mali)
- Bronze standard documentary feature film: Makongo by Elvis Sabin Ngaibino (Central African Republic)
- Poulain d’or short film: Serbi (Les Tissus blancs) by Moly Kane (Senegal)
- Silver foal fiction short film: Amani by Alliah Fafin (Rwanda)
- Short film fiction bronze foal: Zalissa by Carine Bado (Burkina Faso)
- Poulain d’Or documentary short film: Ethereality by Kantarama Gahigiri (Rwanda)
- Silver foal short film: I bit my tongue by Nina Khada (Algeria)
- Bronze foal short film: Nuit Debout by Nelson Makengo (DRCongo)

== 28th FESPACO (2023) ==
- First Prize (Étalon d'or de Yennenga): Ashkal by Youssef Chebbi (Tunisia)
- Second Prize: Sira by Apolline Traoré (Burkina Faso)
- Third Prize: Shimoni by Angela Wamai (Kenya)
- Special Mention of the Jury: Regarde les etoiles by David Constantin (Mauritius)
- Best Actor: all actors in Under the Fig Trees by Erige Sehiri (Tunisia)
- Best Actress: all actresses in Under the Fig Trees by Erige Sehiri (Tunisia)
- Best Set: Mami Wata by C. J. Obasi (Nigeria)
- Best Editing: Abu Saddam by Nadine Khan (Egypt)
- Best Screenplay: The Blue Caftan by Maryam Touzani (Morocco)
- Best Cinematography: Mami Wata by C. J. Obasi (Nigeria)
- Best Sound: Ashkal by Youssef Chebbi (Tunisia)
- Best Music: Our Lady of the Chinese Shop by Ery Claver (Angola)
- Paul Robeson Prize for best non-competition movie: The Specter of Boko Haram by Cyrielle Raingou (Cameroon)
- Golden prize documentary feature film: The New Man by Carlos Yuri Ceunick (Cape Verde)
- Silver prize documentary feature film: We, students by Rafiki Farala (Central African Republic)
- Bronze prize documentary feature film: Guardian of the Worlds by Leila Chaibi (Algeria)
- Poulain d’or short film: Come to See Me by Mo Harawe (Somalia)
- Silver Poulin fiction short film: A Doll by Andriaminosa Hary and Joel Rakotovelo (Madagascar)
- Short film fiction Bronze Colt: Tsutsue by Amartei Armar (Ghana)
- Special Jury Mention for short film fiction: The Messenger of God by Amina Mamani (Niger)
- Poulain d’Or documentary short film: Blind Spot by Lotfi Achour (Tunisia)
- Silver foal documentary short film: Katanga Nation by Beza Hailu Lemma (Ethiopia)
- Bronze foal documentary short film: Kalasi by Fransix Tenda Lomba (DR Congo)
- Special Jury Mention for documentary short film: Cuba in Africa by Negash Abdurahman (Ethiopia)
- Best Burkinabè film: Laabli the Elusive by Luc Youlouka Dambia
- Best Burkinabè hope: La Botaniste by Floriane Zoundi
- Revelation of Burkinabè cinema: Malla, As Far as the Night Least by Dramane Ouédraogo
- Oumarou Ganda Prize: Soula by Salah Issaad (Algeria)

== See also ==
- List of television festivals
- Étalon de Yennenga
