= List of Republic of the Congo films =

An alphabetical list of films produced in the Republic of the Congo:

== C ==
- Chapelle, La (1980)
- Chasse à l'aigrette en Afrique (1911)
- Corps et l'esprit, Le (1977)
- Congo Calling (2019)

== D ==
- Der Leone have sept cabeças (1971)
- Dernier des Babingas, Le (1990)
- Décision, La (1987)

== F ==
- Festival panafricain d'Alger (1970)

== I ==
- Illusions (1970)

== K ==
- Konga Yo (1962)

== M ==
- M'Pongo (1982)
- Manioc (1983)
- Mwana keba (1970)

== R ==
- Rançon d'une alliance, La (1974)

== T ==
- Tenrikyo, une tradition en toge noire (2006)

== V ==
- Voyage à Ouaga (2001)
