= 6th Moscow International Film Festival =

Film festival

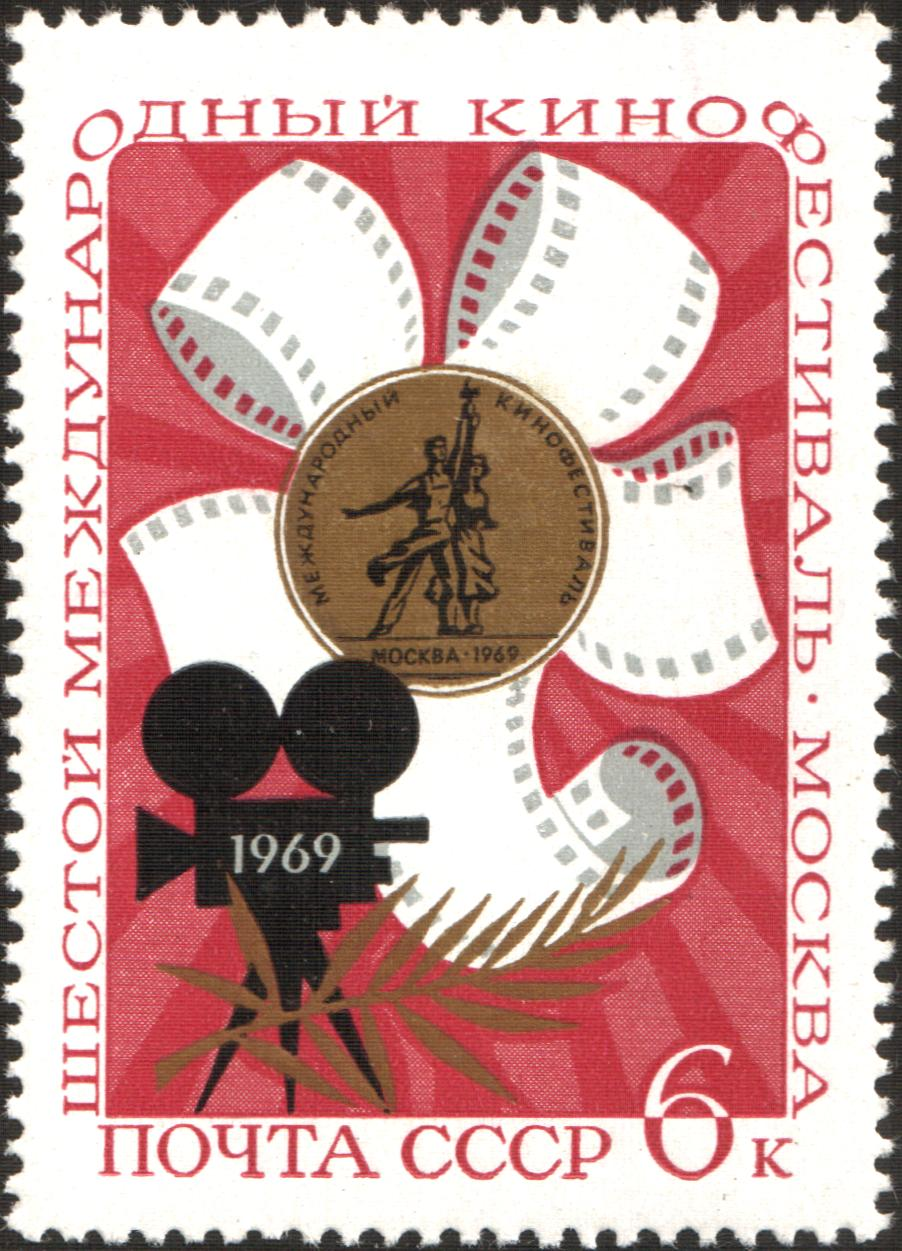
- A 1969 Soviet stamp for the Film, Camera and Medal. Seriesː 6th Moscow International Film Festival
- Location: Moscow, Soviet Union
- Founded: 1959
- Awards: Grand Prix
- Festival date: 7–22 July 1969
- Website: http://www.moscowfilmfestival.ru

The 6th Moscow International Film Festival was held from 7 to 22 July 1969. The Golden Prizes were awarded to the Cuban film Lucía directed by Humberto Solás, the Italian film Serafino directed by Pietro Germi and the Soviet film We'll Live Till Monday directed by Stanislav Rostotsky.

== Jury ==
- Sergei Gerasimov (USSR - President of the Jury)
- Dev Anand (India)
- Vija Artmane (USSR)
- King Vidor (USA)
- Erwin Geschonneck (East Germany)
- Anatoli Golovnya (USSR)
- Mbissine Thérèse Diop (Senegal)
- Zahari Zhandov (Bulgaria)
- Stanislav Zvonicek (Czechoslovakia)
- Jerzy Kawalerowicz (Poland)
- Ion Popescu-Gopo (Romania)
- Glauber Rocha (Brazil)
- István Szabó (Hungary)
- Alberto Sordi (Italy)
- Yves Ciampi (France)
- Madiha Yousri (Egypt)

== Films in competition ==
The following films were selected for the main competition:

English title	Original title	Director(s)	Production country
The Brothers Karamazov	Bratya Karamazovy	Ivan Pyryev	Soviet Union
Jazz All Around	Midt i en jazztid	Knud Leif Thomsen	Denmark
Time to Live	Le Temps de vivre	Bernard Paul	France
Playtime	Playtime	Jacques Tati	France, Italy
Scorched Earth	Brent jord	Knut Andersen	Norway
2000 Weeks	2000 Weeks	Tim Burstall	Australia
2001: A Space Odyssey	2001: A Space Odyssey	Stanley Kubrick	Great Britain, United States
Walls	Falak	András Kovács	Hungary
Diary of a German Woman	Du bist min (Ein deutsches Tagebuch)	Annelie Thorndike, Andrew Thorndike	East Germany
We'll Live Till Monday	Доживём до понедельника, Dozhivyom do ponedelnika	Stanislav Rostotsky	Soviet Union
Palaver (film)	Palaver	Emile Degelin	Belgium
A Woman for a Season	O femeie pentru un anotimp	Gheorghe Vitanidis	Romania
Here, Beneath the North Star	Täällä Pohjantähden alla	Edvin Laine	Finland
Cabascabo	Cabascabo	Oumarou Ganda	Niger
When You Hear the Bells	Kad čuješ zvona	Antun Vrdoljak	Yugoslavia
The Lanfier Colony	Kolonie Lanfieri	Jan Schmidt	Czechoslovakia, Soviet Union
The Corridor	Korridoren	Jan Halldoff	Sweden
A Taste of Fear	شئ من الخوف	Hussein Kamal	Egypt
Lucía	Lucía	Humberto Solás	Cuba
Oliver!	Oliver!	Carol Reed	Great Britain
Colonel Wolodyjowski	Pan Wolodyjowski	Jerzy Hoffman	Poland
Ayúdeme usted compadre	Ayúdeme usted compadre	Germán Becker	Chile
River Without a Bridge	Hashi no nai kawa	Tadashi Imai	Japan
Nawab Sirajuddaula	Nawab sirajuddaula	Khan Ataur Rahman	Pakistan
The Wanton of Spain	La celestina	César Fernández Ardavín	Spain, West Germany
Serafino	Serafino	Pietro Germi	Italy, France
Simón Bolívar	Simón Bolívar	Alessandro Blasetti	Italy, Spain
Megh-o-roudra	Megh-o-roudra	Arundhati Devi	India
Seven Days Grace	Sieben Tage Frist	Alfred Vohrer	West Germany
Tango	Tango	Vasil Mirchev	Bulgaria
Brief Heaven	Breve cielo	David José Kohon	Argentina
Morning	Ogloo	Dejidiin Jigjid	Mongolia

== Awards ==
- Golden Prize:
  - Lucía by Humberto Solás
  - Serafino by Pietro Germi
  - We'll Live Till Monday by Stanislav Rostotsky
- Silver Prizes:
  - Playtime by Jacques Tati
  - When You Hear the Bells by Antun Vrdoljak
- Special Prizes:
  - Carol Reed for Oliver!
  - Annelie Thorndike, Andrew Thorndike for Diary of a German Woman
  - Ivan Pyryev for The Brothers Karamazov
- Prizes:
  - Best Actor: Ron Moody for Oliver!
  - Best Actor: Tadeusz Łomnicki for Colonel Wolodyjowski
  - Best Actress: Irina Petrescu for A Woman for a Season
  - Best Actress: Ana María Picchio for Brief Heaven
- Diplomas:
  - Scorched Earth by Knut Andersen
  - Cabascabo by Oumarou Ganda
  - Director: András Kovács for Walls
  - Director of photography: Ivailo Tranchev for Tango
- Prix FIPRESCI: Lucía by Humberto Solás
