= Boubou Hama =

Nigerien author, historian, and politician (1906–1982)

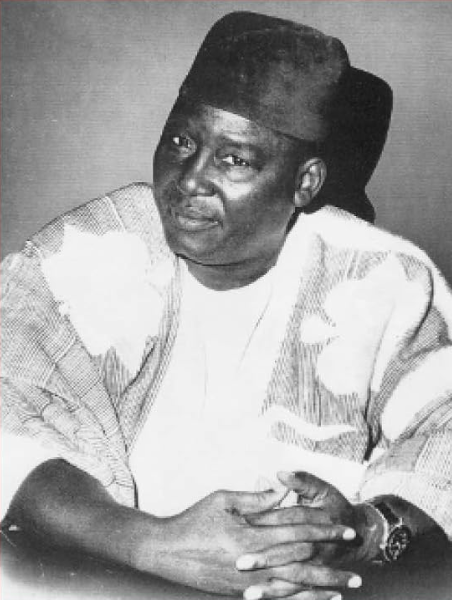

President of the National Assembly of Niger
- In office 28 September 1958 – 15 April 1974
- Preceded by: Post established

Mayor of Niamey
- In office 23 January 1959 – 16 July 1966
- Preceded by: Djibo Bakary
- Succeeded by: Daddy Gaoh

Personal details
- Born: 1906 Fonéko Tédjo, Niger, French West Africa
- Died: 29 January 1982 (aged 75–76) Niamey, Niger
- Party: PPN-RDA
- Education: Académie des sciences d'outre-mer

Boubou Hama (1906 – 29 January 1982) was a Nigerien writer, historian, and politician. He was President of the National Assembly of Niger under former President of Niger, Hamani Diori. He died in Niamey in 1982.

He was also a member of the Scientific Committee of UNESCO's General History of Africa (1971–1978). He contributed to the establishment of the project and chaired the founding expert meeting held in June 1969, entitled Meeting of Experts on the Measures to be Taken for Drafting and Publishing a General History of Africa, during which the methodological principles and the organization of the drafting of the work were defined.

== Life and works ==
Hama was born at Fonéko, a small Songhai village in western Niger. He studied at the École normale supérieure William Ponty and began his career as a teacher, in the mid-1920s becoming the first French-trained primary school teacher from what would soon become Niger. As a writer he worked in many genres including history and theater. His writing gained international attention when his autobiography Kotia-nima (published with the support of UNESCO in 1971) won the Grand prix littéraire d'Afrique noire. His essay on African education won the Léopold Sédar Senghor Prize in the same year. His histories are said to place a great value on oral literature.

In 1956, he participated alongside Alioune Diop, Aimé Césaire, Cheikh Anta Diop, Frantz Fanon, James Baldwin and others in the First Congress of Black Writers and Artists held at the Sorbonne in Paris.

== Political career ==
Hama had been one of the founders of the Nigerien Progressive Party (PPN), a regional branch of the African Democratic Rally (RDA), and rose to become a close adviser of party leader and Deputy to the French National Assembly Hamani Diori. Following independence in 1960, the PPN became the ruling and sole legal party in Niger, and Hama became President of the National Assembly of Niger from 1961 to 1964. He was also one of the most prominent, and perhaps most powerful, members of the PPN politburo, which became the effective ruling body of the nation. One writer has called Boubou Hama the "eminence grise" behind Diori's rule. The National Assembly of Niger met in largely ceremonial yearly sittings to ratify government positions. Traditional notables, elected as parliamentary representatives, often unanimously endorsed government proposals. Diori was re-elected unopposed in 1965 and 1970, but overthrown by military coup in 1974.

== Literary works ==
- L'Empire de Gao : histoire, coutumes et magie des Sonrai, Adrien-Maisonneuve, 1954 (with Jean Boulnois), preface by Théodore Monod.
- Histoire du Gobir et de Sokoto, Présence africaine,1967
- Recherche sur l'histoire des Touareg sahariens et soudanais, Présence africaine, 1967
- Histoire traditionnelle d'un peuple: les Zarma-Songhay, Présence africaine, 1967
- Contribution à la connaissance de l'histoire des Peul, Présence africaine, 1968
- Histoire traditionnelle d'un village songhay, Fonéko, Présence africaine, 1970
- L'Empire songhay : ses ethnies, ses légendes et ses personnages historiques, P.J. Oswald, 1974
- Écrits sur le Soudan, Niamey, CELHTO, 1983
- Askia Mohammed Aboubaca : l'élhadj et le khalife, à travers la tradition et le "Fettach", CELTHO, 1980

=== Novels ===
- Kotia-Nima, a work in three volumes, Présence africaine, 1969
- L'Aventure extraordinaire de Bi Kado, fils de Noir, Paris, République du Niger - Présence africaine, 1971
- Le Double d'hier rencontre demain, Paris, Union générale d'éditions, 1973 (preface by Jean Rouch)
- Hon si suba ben (aujourd'hui n'épuise pas demain), Paris, P.J. Oswald, 1973

=== Essays ===
- Enquête sur les fondements et la genèse de l'unité africaine, Présence africaine, 1966
- Essai d'analyse de l'éducation africaine, Présence africaine, 1968
- Merveilleuse Afrique, Présence africaine, 1971
- Le Retard de l'Afrique, Présence africaine, 1972
- Cet autre de l'homme, Présence africaine, 1972
- Les Problèmes brûlants de l'Afrique, Paris, P.J. Oswald, 1973 (preface by Cheikh Hamidou Kane).
- Les Grands problèmes de l'Afrique des indépendances, P.J. Oswald, 1974

=== Tales and children's books ===
- Bagouma et Tégouma, a work in two volumes, Présence africaine, 1973
- Contes et légendes du Niger, Présence africaine, a work in six volumes, 1972-1976
- Izé-Gani, a work in two volumes, Présence africaine, 1985

With Andrée Clair :

- Le Baobab merveilleux, images de Marianne Padé, Éditions La Farandole, 1971
- L'Aventure d'albarka, Juillard, 1972
- Kangué Izé, images from Béatrice Tanaka, La Farandole, 1974
- Founya le vaurien, images from Béatrice Tanaka, G.P., 1975
- Les Fameuses histoires du village de Tibbo, La Farandole, 1977

== UNESCO collective works ==
- Le Droit d'être un homme, Jeanne Hersch, UNESCO, 1968 (L'odyssée du vaillant Goroo-Bâ-Dicko, Boubou Hama)
- Le Temps et les philosophies, Paul Ricoeur, UNESCO, 1978, (chap. 7 : Le Devin. Temps et histoire dans la pensée animiste de l'Afrique noire, Boubou Hama)
- The General History of Africa (GHA), The place of history in African society, UNESCO, 1980, volume 1, chap, 2, with Joseph Ki-Zerbo)

== Cinematographic works ==
- Babatu, les trois conseils, screenwriter (by Jean Rouch, 1976)

Selected in Festival de Cannes's official competition in 1976 and Cannes Classics in 2017.

- Toula ou le génie des eaux, screenwriter (by Moustapha Alassane, 1973)

== Theatrical works ==
- La force du lait, RFI Théâtre, 1971
- Sonni Ali Ber, RFI Théâtre, 1971

== Heritage and legacy ==
- Musée National Boubou Hama: In 2008, the museum was renamed Musée National Boubou Hama (MNBH) under Law No. 2008-11 of 30 April 2008.
- The Boubou Hama Literary Prize: Created in 1989 by Niger's Ministry of Culture, under the initiative of Inoussa Ousseïni, this prize aimed to honor the memory of Boubou Hama while encouraging national literary production. It has rewarded major works such as Sarraounia by Abdoulaye Mamani.
- The renaming of Niamey's streets: In January 2025, Avenue François Mitterrand was renamed Avenue Boubou Hama.
- The Year of Boubou Hama: Ministerial Order No. 012/MCA/C of 14 February 2006 designated the year 2006 as the Boubou Hama Year to celebrate the centenary of his birth.

== See also ==
- Musée National Boubou Hama
