= Moustapha Alassane's Cinema of Possibilities =

- French: Moustapha Alassane, cinéaste du possible
- Directed by: Maria Silvia Bazzoli, Christian Lelong
- Produced by: Cinédoc Films
- Cinematography: Christian Lelong
- Edited by: François Sculier
- Release date: 2009
- Running time: 93 minutes
- Country: France

Moustapha Alassane's Cinema of Possibilities (French: Moustapha Alassane, cinéaste du possible) is a 2009 documentary film.

== Synopsis ==
Moustapha Alassane is a living legend in African cinema. His adventures take us to the era of "pre-cinema", to the times of magical lantern and Chinese shadows. He is the first director of Nigerien cinema and animation films in Africa. He tells very old stories with current technology, but he also narrates the most current events with the most archaic means. This documentary not only tells the adventure of a human being and an extraordinary professional, but the memories of a generation, the history of a country, Niger in its golden age of cinema.
