= Deran (album) =

Studio album by Bombino
- Released: 2018
- Recorded: 2018
- Studio: Studio HIBA, Casablanca; Boston; Studio Youba Dia, Brussels
- Label: Partisan
- Producer: Eric Herman

Bombino chronology
Azel (2015)	Deran (2018)

Deran is the sixth studio album by Nigerien guitarist and singer Bombino. It was recorded in Casablanca at Studio HIBA, a recording studio owned by the king of Morocco.

In May 2018, ahead of the album's release, the music blog, Noisey, called Bombino, "the World's Best Guitarist™." Then, on the day before Deran's release, Bombino was dubbed "the Sultan of Shred" by the New York Times, a nickname that was then adopted by several news outlets around the world. Deran was officially released on 18 May 2018, and was received with wide-spread acclaim for both its musicality and its embracement of culture and heritage. Jason Heller of NPR wrote that Bombino's performance on the album, "speaks and breathes across centuries." Deran was nominated in the category of Best World Music Album at the 61st Annual Grammy Awards. Bombino is the first Nigerien artist to be nominated for a Grammy award.

== Track listing ==
No.	Title	Length
1.	"Imajghane (The Tuareg people)"
2.	"Deran Deran Alkheir (Best wishes)"
3.	"Tehigren (The trees)"
4.	"Midiwan (My friends)"
5.	"Tenesse (Idleness)"
6.	"Oulhin (My heart burns)"
7.	"Adouni Dagh (This life)"
8.	"Tamasheq (The Tuareg language)"
9.	"Takamba (Takamba)"
10.	"Adouagh Chegren (At the top of the mountain)"
