= Operation Teutonic Sword =

1958 film

- Directed by: Andrew Thorndike; Annelie Thorndike
- Release date: 1958
- Country: German Democratic Republic
- Language: German

Operation Teutonic Sword (German: Unternehmen Teutonenschwert) is an East German film. It was released in 1958.
