= Women Cars Villas Money =

F.V.V.A. - Femmes Voitures Villas Argent
- Directed by: Moustapha Alassane
- Written by: Moustapha Alassane
- Starring: Zingare Abdoulaye; Sawadogo Bintou; Sotigui Kouyaté; Djingareye Maiga; Zalika Souley
- Music by: Kuyaté Sotigui, Ensemble Super-Volta
- Distributed by: Marfilmes
- Release date: 1972
- Running time: 62 minutes
- Country: Niger
- Language: French

Women Cars Villas Money (French: F.V.V.A. - Femmes Voitures Villas Argent) is a 1972 drama film directed by Moustapha Alassane.

== Synopsis ==
Ali is a modest civil servant who enjoys a pleasant life in town. One day, upon being forced by his parents to marry a woman he doesn't want, Ali is dragged into a vortex composed by "Women (Femmes), Cars (Voitures), Villas, Money (Argent)" all of which, in Niger, stand for social success. Longing for an increasingly luxurious way of life, in order to support habits he himself created, Ali is forced to steal and is arrested. When everyone else abandons him, his first wife reveals her loyalty and awaits his release. The film depicts the frantic search for consumer goods by the low middle classes of the African cities and it was, according to Véronique Cayla, director of the Centre national de la Cinématographie (France), of remarking importance for the youngsters back in those years.

== Festivals ==
- Rotterdam International Film Festival, The Netherlands (2010)

== Awards ==
- Prize OCAM at FESPACO - Panafrican Film and Television Festival of Ouagadougo, Burkina Faso (1972)

== See also ==
- Moustapha Alassane
