= Polygamy in Niger =

Polygamous marriages are recognized in Niger under customary law. The practice was present among indigenous populations but was greatly popularized after French Missionaries explored the region in 1901. Today, it is estimated that over one third of Nigerien women are in polygamous unions.

== See also ==
- Le Wazzou polygame
