= Zinder (film) =

- Directed by: Aicha Macky
- Produced by: Clara Vuillermoz (Les films du balibari), Ousmane Samassekou (Tabous production), Erik Winker (CORSO Films), Martin Roelly (CORSO Films), Impact Producer: Julia Hammett-Jamart
- Cinematography: Julien Bossé
- Edited by: Karen Benainous
- Music by: Dominique Peter
- Release date: 2021
- Running time: 82 minutes
- Country: Niger
- Language: Hausa

Zinder is a 2021 Nigerien documentary film directed by Aicha Macky. The film lends its title to the filmmaker's hometown Zinder. It won the best documentary award at the Reykjavík International Film Festival and was nominated to the Tanit d'or at the Carthage Film Festival, among other nominations.

== Synopsis ==
In Kara-Kara, a marginalized district of Zinder in Niger, historically the district of lepers, a violent gang culture reigns. Some young people are trying to escape it, attempting to offer themselves a future other than one behind bars. Director Aicha Macky chronicles their daily lives.
