= Bombino (musician) =

Nigerien guitarist, composer and singer-songwriter

Bombino ⴱⵓⵎⴱⵉⵏⵓ
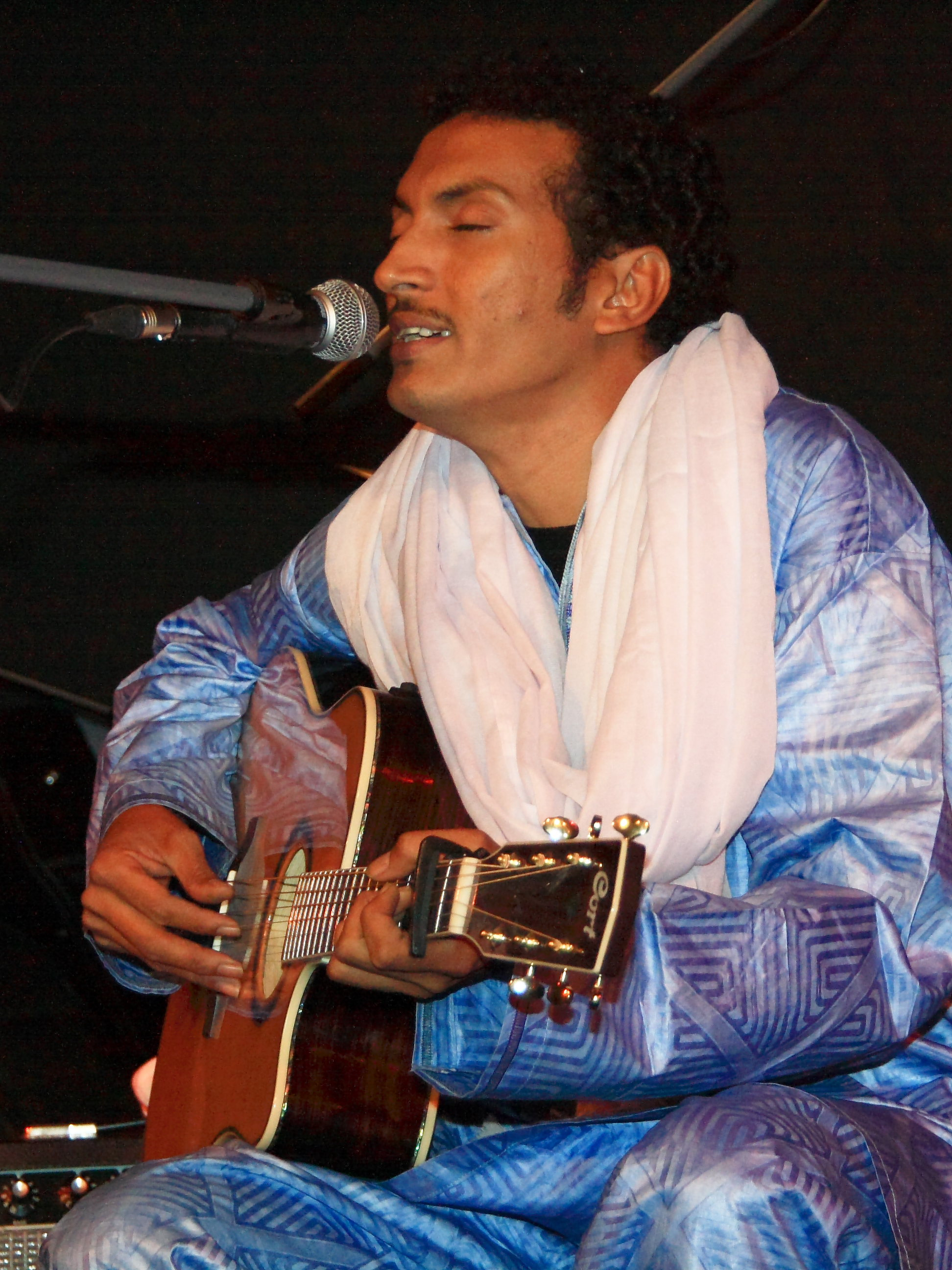
- Bombino performing at the Kult in Niederstetten, Germany

Background information
- Born: Goumour Almoctar; 1 January 1980 (age 46); Tidene, Niger
- Genres: Saharan rock, blues, Tuareg music
- Occupations: Musician, singer
- Instruments: Guitar, vocals
- Labels: Cumbancha Discovery, Nonesuch, Partisan
- Website: www.bombinomusic.com

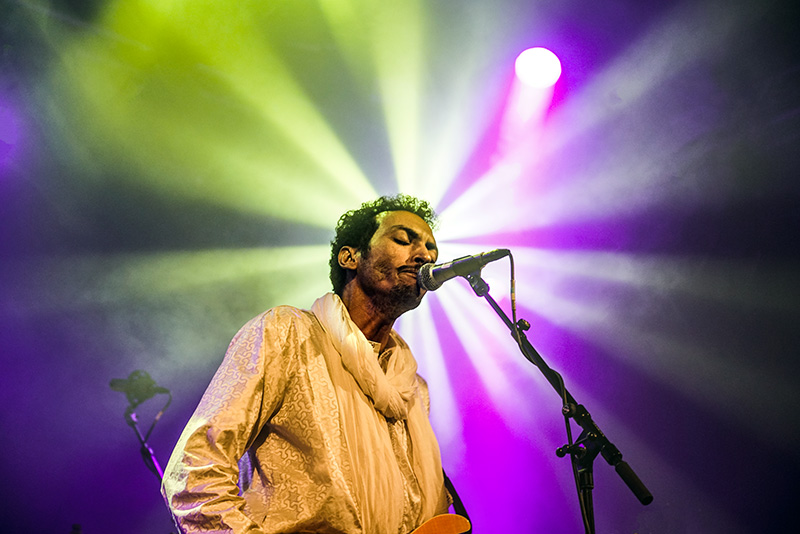
At Aarhus Festival, Denmark 2018

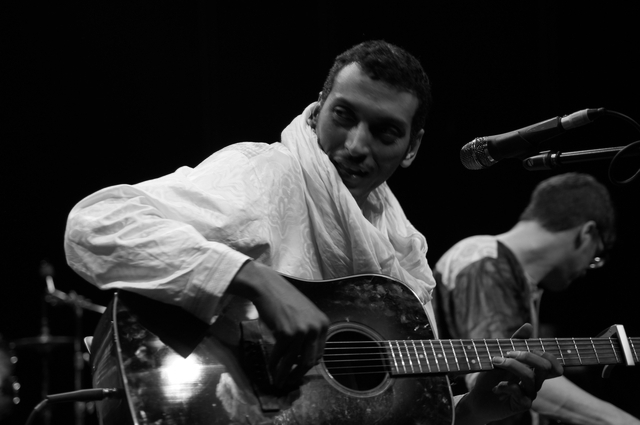
Bombino performing live at the Druga Godba Festival in Ljubljana, Slovenia (2014)

Omara "Bombino" Moctar (in Tifinagh ⴱⵓⵎⴱⵉⵏⵓ; born 1 January 1980) is a Tuareg singer-songwriter and guitarist from Niger. His music is sung in Tamasheq and often addresses Tuareg geopolitical concerns. Bombino is the subject of the documentary film Agadez, the Music and the Rebellion.

== Biography ==
=== Youth and musical beginnings ===
Bombino was born in 1980 in Tidene, Niger, a Tuareg encampment about 80 kilometers northeast of Agadez. He is a member of the Ifoghas tribe, which belongs to the Kel Air Tuareg federation. Following the outbreak of the Tuareg Rebellion in 1990, Bombino, along with his father and grandmother, was forced to flee to neighboring Algeria for safety. During this time, visiting relatives left behind a guitar, and Bombino began to teach himself how to play. He later studied with renowned Tuareg guitarist Haja Bebe. Bebe asked him to join his band where he gained the nickname "Bombino", which is derived from the Italian word "bambino", meaning 'little child'. While living in Algeria and Libya in his teen years, Bombino and his friends watched videos of Jimi Hendrix, Mark Knopfler and others to learn their styles. He worked as both a musician and a herder in the desert near Tripoli. By 1997, Bombino had returned to Agadez and began life as a professional musician.

=== Recordings and unrest in Niger ===
Filmmaker Hisham Mayet managed to track down and record Bombino and his electric band in 2007 during a wedding performance. That recording takes up one side of the original vinyl release of Group Bombino – Guitars from Agadez, vol. 2, released in 2009 by Sublime Frequencies. The A-side contains acoustic performances, in the 'dry guitar' style. Later in 2007, tensions grew again in Niger and ultimately erupted into another Tuareg Rebellion. The government, hoping to thwart the rebellion in all its forms, banned guitars for the Tuareg, as the instrument was seen as a symbol of rebellion. Bombino remarked in an interview, "I do not see my guitar as a gun but rather as a hammer with which to help build the house of the Tuareg people." Additionally, two of Bombino's fellow musicians were executed, and he was forced into exile in neighboring Burkina Faso.

=== International career, and return home ===
Bombino then joined Tidawt, a band by Nigerien musician Hasso Akotey, which performed in North America in an exhibit of Tuareg art organized by the Cantor Center for Visual Arts. While there, Tidawt was invited by saxophonist Tim Ries to perform in his new album of The Rolling Stones versions, Stone's World: The Rolling Stones Project Volume 2, where they played in a cover of "Hey Negrita", with band members Keith Richards and Charlie Watts. Bombino later said he had never heard of The Rolling Stones, given that white rock musicians do not have a strong following in Africa.

In January 2010, Bombino was able to return to his home in Agadez. To celebrate the end of the conflict, a large concert was organized at the base of the Grand Mosque in Agadez, having received the blessing of the Sultan. Bombino and his band played to over a thousand people at the concert, all dancing and celebrating the end of their struggle. The footage was also recorded for a documentary, Agadez, the Music and the Rebellion.

While Bombino lived in exile in Burkina Faso, filmmaker Ron Wyman, having heard cassette recordings of his music, tracked him down and encouraged Bombino to properly record his music. Bombino agreed, and the two of them, with the help of Chris Decato, produced an album together in Agadez. The recordings culminated in his album Agadez, released in April 2011. Agadez debuted at the top of the iTunes World Chart.

The success of Agadez attracted many musical stars to Bombino including Dan Auerbach of The Black Keys. In June 2012, Auerbach began producing Bombino's second international solo album titled Nomad. Nomad was released by Nonesuch Records on April 2, 2013 and debuted at number one on the iTunes World Chart and Billboard World Chart. The album garnered him acclaim as a "virtuoso". In the meantime, war broke out again in Mali, and a few months after that Bombino and Tinariwen played a show in Paris, where they confirmed the idea of their music as essentially rebellious. Bombino began a concert tour of the United States in May 2013. The tour includes appearances at major music festivals, including Bonnaroo and The Newport Folk Festival. In 2013, Bombino was also invited to open for Robert Plant, Amadou & Mariam and Gogol Bordello.

On April 1, 2016, Bombino released Azel. It was produced by David Longstreth of Dirty Projectors Pitchfork's Andy Beta notes that the record "features a sublime iteration of desert blues that's both authentic and ambitious."

For his sixth studio album, Deran, Bombino recorded in Casablanca at Studio HIBA, a recording studio owned by the king of Morocco. In May 2018, ahead of the album's release, the music blog, Noisey, called Bombino "the World's Best Guitarist™." Then, on the day before Deran's release, Bombino was dubbed "the Sultan of Shred" by The New York Times, a nickname that was then adopted by several news outlets around the world. Deran was officially released on May 18, 2018, and was received with widespread acclaim for both its musicality and its embracement of culture and heritage. Jason Heller of NPR wrote that Bombino's performance on the album "speaks and breathes across centuries." Deran was nominated in the category of Best World Music Album at the 61st Annual Grammy Awards. Bombino is the first Nigerien artist to be nominated for a Grammy award.

In 2021, Bombino released Live in Amsterdam, and in 2023, he released Sahel, both on Partisan Records.

== Discography ==
- 2009 – Group Bombino – Guitars from Agadez, vol. 2 (Sublime Frequencies)
- 2010 – Agamgam 2004 (Reaktion)
- 2011 – Agadez (Cumbancha)
- 2013 – Nomad (Nonesuch)
- 2016 – Azel (Partisan)
- 2017 – "La Sombra" by Residente (guest performance)
- 2018 – Deran (Partisan)
- 2020 – Live In Amsterdam (Partisan)
- 2023 – Sahel (Partisan)
