= Der Weg nach oben =

1950 film

- Directed by: Andrew Thorndike, Karl Gass
- Written by: Andrew Thorndike
- Narrated by: Harry Hindemith
- Cinematography: Werner Bergmann, Walter Fehdmer, Kurt Stanke
- Distributed by: DEFA Studio für Wochenschau und Dokumentarfilme
- Release date: 6 October 1950
- Running time: 81 minutes
- Country: East Germany
- Language: German

Der Weg nach oben (The Way Up; Chronicle Of The Rise) is an East German political and economic propaganda film in the style of a documentary film directed by Andrew Thorndike. It was released in 1950, premiering on the eve of the first anniversary of the German Democratic Republic. It won the Best Documentary Film at the Karlovy Vary International Film Festival in 1951. The film was produced by DEFA Studio für Wochenschau und Dokumentarfilme. This was Thorndike's first feature-length film.

== Content ==
The film purports to show improvements made in East Germany in the late 1940s, including land reform and steel industry developments, the founding of the Socialist Unity Party, the expropriation of war criminals, and the first Five-year plan. Simultaneously, it is a scathing critique of western involvement in Western Germany in the post-war years, believing that it would lead to economic oppression throughout Europe. Western Germany is depicted as being plagued by unemployment (with over 2 million people out of work), child labour, and female student prostitution. According to John Davidson and Sabne Hake, authors of Framing the Fifties: Cinema in a Divided Germany, "the film describes the most important stations of the young GDR as a 'chronicle of ascension', to quote the working title". By contrast, "the representation of West Germany aims to place the FRG in line with National Socialism, and in that tradition, as a vassal of the Western powers and a servant of imperialist politics, respectively". Davidson and Hake find this clearly illustrated in the opening moments of the film. In the film, prominent Nazis are shown at the Nuremberg trials, and a voiceover states that their work is being continued by the likes of Konrad Adenauer, Kurt Schumacher, Winston Churchill, and Harry Truman.

== Bibliography ==
- Bock, Hans-Michael; Bergfelder, Tim (2009). The Concise Cinegraph: An Encyclopedia of German Cinema. Bergehahn Books. ISBN 978-1-57181-655-9.
- Davidson, John E.; Hake, Sabina (2007). Framing the Fifties: Cinema in a Divided Germany. Bergehahn Books. ISBN 978-1-84545-204-9.
