= Time to Live (film) =

1969 film

- Film poster
- Directed by: Bernard Paul
- Written by: Bernard Paul
- Produced by: Jacques Rouffio
- Starring: Marina Vlady
- Cinematography: William Lubtchansky
- Release date: 11 June 1969
- Running time: 100 minutes
- Country: France
- Language: French

Time to Live (French: Le Temps de vivre) is a 1969 French drama film directed by Bernard Paul. It was entered into the 6th Moscow International Film Festival.

== Cast ==
- Marina Vlady as Marie
- Frédéric de Pasquale as Louis
- Catherine Allégret as Catherine
- Françoise Godde as Angelina, la serveuse
- Chris Avram as Michel Casno
- Yves Afonso as René
- Georges Staquet as Enrico
- Boudjema Bouhada as Mohammed
- Louise Rioton as La belle-mère de Louis
- Anne Guillard as Corinne
- Eric Damain as Jean-Marc
