= Vasil Mirchev =

Bulgarian film director

- Born: 23 March 1927; Plovdiv, Bulgaria
- Died: 9 January 2003 (aged 75); Sofia, Bulgaria
- Occupation: Film director
- Years active: 1965-1986

Vasil Mirchev (Bulgarian: Васил Мирчев, 23 March 1927 – 9 January 2003) was a Bulgarian film director. He directed nine films between 1965 and 1986. His 1969 film Tango was entered into the 6th Moscow International Film Festival.

== Selected filmography ==
- Tango (1969)
