= Jean-Michel Tchissoukou =

Congolese film director

- Born: 1942; Pointe-Noire
- Died: 1997 (aged 54–55)
- Education: Institut national de l'audiovisuel
- Occupation: Filmmaker
- Notable work: Illusions, 1970

Jean-Michel Tchissoukou (1942-1997) was a Congolese filmmaker.

== Life ==
Jean-Michel Tchissoukou was born 1942 in Pointe-Noire. He studied filmmaking in Paris at the Institut national de l'audiovisuel and at Ocora. On his return to the Congo, he spent a decade working for the national television channel. His first film, Illusions (1970) was a medium-length feature about a peasant who comes to live in the city with his parents. Tchissoukou was also assistant to Sarah Maldoror on Sambizanga (1972).

Tchissoukou's first feature film, The Chapel, won a 1981 FESPACO award. His second feature film, The Wrestlers, examined Congolese identity using a mix of fiction and documentary.

Tchissoukou died in Brazzaville in 1997.

== Films ==
- Illusions, 1970.
- La Chapelle / The Chapel, 1979.
- Les Lutteurs / M'Pongo / The Wrestlers, 1982.
