= Youth Sports Festival =

1951 film

- Directed by: Andrew Thorndike; Dmitri Vasilyev
- Release date: 1951
- Running time: 84 minutes
- Country: East Germany
- Language: German

Youth Sports Festival is an East German sports documentary film about the athletics competition featured at the 3rd World Festival of Youth and Students held in Berlin in 1951. It was released in 1951 and was directed by Andrew Thorndike and Dmitri Vasilyev.
