= Wilhelm Pieck – Das Leben unseres Präsidenten =

1952 film

- VHS cover
- Directed by: Andrew Thorndike
- Written by: Andrew Thorndike, Otto Winzer
- Music by: Hanns Eisler
- Distributed by: VEB DEFA Studio für Wochenschau und Dokumentarfilme
- Release date: 1952
- Running time: 80 minutes
- Country: East Germany
- Language: German

Wilhelm Pieck – Das Leben unseres Präsidenten (Wilhelm Pieck: the Life of Our President) is a 1952 East German documentary film directed by Andrew Thorndike about the life of GDR President Wilhelm Pieck. It opened on 2 January 1952 in the cinemas of East Germany and East Berlin. The film consists mainly of still images illustrating Pieck's life and related German history. There are only a few motion picture sequences, for example Lenin's funeral and the post-1945 period.

== Reception ==
According to Neues Deutschland, run by the Socialist Unity Party of Germany, the film had "overwhelming success" and the cinemas were sold out. Der Spiegel commented that the film "put a Marxist spin on the past 50 years".

In 1951, Wilhelm Pieck – Das Leben unseres Präsidenten was the opening film of Czechoslovakia's German Film Week. Director and screenwriter Andrew Thorndike was awarded the National Prize of East Germany, third class, for the film.
