= Azel (album) =

2016 studio album by Bombino

Studio album by Bombino
- Released: April 1, 2016
- Recorded: fall 2015 at Applehead Recording Studios, Woodstock, NY
- Genre: Blues, folk
- Label: Partisan
- Producer: Dave Longstreth

Bombino chronology
| Nomad (2013) | Azel (2016) | Deran (2018) |

Professional ratings
Aggregate scores
| Source | Rating |
|---|---|
| Metacritic | 81/100 |
Review scores
| Source | Rating |
| AllMusic | 4.5/5 stars |

Azel is the third studio album by Nigerien musician Bombino. It was released on April 1, 2016 under Partisan Records.

== Track listing ==
| No. | Title | Length |
|---|---|---|
| 1. | "Akhar Zaman (This Moment)" | 3:51 |
| 2. | "Iwaranagh (We Must)" | 4:59 |
| 3. | "Inar (If You Know the Degree of My Love for You)" | 3:46 |
| 4. | "Tamiditine Tarhanam (My Love, I Tell You)" | 4:03 |
| 5. | "Timtar (Memories)" | 4:53 |
| 6. | "Iyat Ninhay/Jaguar (A Great Desert I Saw)" | 6:07 |
| 7. | "Igmayagh Dum (My Lover)" | 5:45 |
| 8. | "Ashuhada (Martyrs of the First Rebellion)" | 3:24 |
| 9. | "Timidiwa (Friendship)" | 4:21 |
| 10. | "Naqqim Dagh Timshar (We Are Left in This Abandoned Place)" | 5:39 |
