= Du und mancher Kamerad =

1956 film

- Film poster
- Directed by: Andrew Thorndike and Annelie Thorndike
- Written by: Günther Rücker, Andrew Thorndike, Annelie Thorndike, Karl-Eduard von Schnitzler
- Narrated by: Günther Rücker
- Cinematography: Kurt Stanke, Waldemar Ruge, Walter Fuchs, Joachim Lubinau, Ernst Kunstmann, Vera Futterlieb, Rudolf Ehrlich, Harry Kadoch
- Edited by: Ella Ulrich
- Music by: Paul Dessau
- Distributed by: DEFA
- Release date: 1956
- Running time: 103 minutes
- Country: East Germany
- Language: German

Du und mancher Kamerad is a 1956 East German documentary film by Andrew and Annelie Thorndike. In English-speaking countries it was titled You and Your Pal or The German Story. The film employed archival footage to draw connections between Imperial Germany, the government of the Weimar Republic, the Third Reich and the government of West Germany at the time. The film has an alternate title of Krieg oder Frieden and is the best-known of the Thorndike films.

An East German newspaper claimed that the film was well received in the United Kingdom. It was banned in West Germany and remained so some years after its release; some subsequent films directed by the Thorndikes were banned in Great Britain by the British Board of Film Classification. When the film ran in Dublin in 1960, the Fine Gael opposition complained in the Dáil that it should have been banned by the Official Censor of Films for meeting the statutory criterion of being "subversive of public morality".
