= Samba the Great =

- Directed by: Moustapha Alassane
- Narrated by: Jean Rouch
- Edited by: D. Tessier
- Music by: S. Dambele
- Production company: l'Universite de Niamey I.R.S.H.
- Release date: 1977
- Running time: 13:36
- Country: Niger
- Language: French

Samba le Grand (Samba the Great) is a stop-motion and animated short film by the pioneering Nigerien film director, Moustapha Alassane.

== Synopsis ==
The adventures of a legendary hero, Samba Gana who, dazzled by the beauty of a princess, asks for her hand in marriage. Annalija Tu Bari sets him several trials, including conquering village after village, which he overcomes. Ultimately, he turns the sword against himself to prove his love and it is only death that the two young people are reunited.

Alassane uses stop-motion puppets against hand-crafted backdrops to tell this folktale. In the end, "Alassane abandons the corporeal (and slightly doll-like) puppets and concludes the retelling in panning shots of oil paintings, magnifying the story an extra degree from bedtime fable to regional myth."

Ethonographic filmmaker and his mentor, Jean Rouch, narrates.

The first animated film to be produced in color in Africa, Samba le Grand was restored in 2019 through a partnership between the French Embassy's Cultural Services in New York and New York University's Moving Image Archiving and Preservation (MIAP) program with the Institut Français.
