= Georges Staquet =

French actor

Georges Staquet (1932, in Bruille-lez-Marchiennes – 2011) was a French actor.

== Partial filmography ==
- The Day and the Hour (1963) - L'aubergiste (uncredited)
- Bande à part (1964) - Legionary
- Marie Soleil (1964)
- Pierrot le Fou (1965) - Franck (uncredited)
- Paris brûle-t-il? (1966) - Capitaine Dronne
- Weekend (1967) - Le conducteur du tracteur (uncredited)
- Time to Live (1969) - Enrico
- Atlantic Wall (1970) - Hippolyte, Le chef des résistants
- Le Tueur (1972)
- L'oeuf (1972) - Eugène
- Das Attentat (1972) - L'officier de police Fleury
- Le Sex Shop (1972) - Emile
- Les Rois maudits (1972-1973, TV Mini-Series) - Lormet
- Sans sommation (1973) - Flic en filature 1
- Happy New Year (1973) - Le commissaire de police à Paris
- R.A.S. (1973) - Adjudant Marcellin
- Hail the Artist (1973) - Charles
- France société anonyme (1974) - Le petit nerveux
- Un jour, la fête (1975)
- If I Had to Do It All Over Again (1976)
- La Zizanie (1978) - Le délégué-ouvrier
- Au bout du bout du banc (1979) - Boyer
- Ogro (1979) - El Albañil
- The Police War (1979) - Millard
- I as in Icarus (1979) - Le gardien de l'immeuble de l'assassinat
- The Woman Cop (1980) - Inspecteur Sondy
- Le Maître d'école (1981) - Le père de Gérard
- Hail Mary (1985)
- Red Kiss (1985) - L'Inspecteur du police
- Un été d'orages (1989) - Chef de la Milice
- Life and Nothing But (1989) - Le curé
- A Day to Remember (1991) - Alain
- IP5 (1992) - Jean-Marie
- Germinal (1993) - Levaque
- La Taule (2000) - Sanseau
- Quelqu'un de bien (2002) - Nénesse, le jardinier
