= Tango (1969 film) =

1969 film

- Directed by: Vasil Mirchev
- Written by: Georgi Karaslavov
- Starring: Nevena Kokanova
- Cinematography: Ivaylo Trenchev
- Release date: 28 February 1969
- Running time: 76 minutes
- Country: Bulgaria
- Language: Bulgarian

Tango (Bulgarian: Танго) is a 1969 Bulgarian drama film directed by Vasil Mirchev. It was entered into the 6th Moscow International Film Festival.

== Cast ==
- Nevena Kokanova as Havadzhieva
- Petar Penkov as Prokurorat Yorgov
- Petar Slabakov as Todor
- Stoyan Gudev as Melnicharyat Milan
- Grigor Vachkov as Ilyo Mitovski
- Dimitrina Savova as Kuna
- Nevena Milosheva as Baba Darya
- Georgi Georgiev as Yordan Mitovski
- Ivan Nalbantov as Ivan Proev
- Boris Savov as Boris Yordanov
- Boris Arabow as Havadzhiev
