= Die Sieben vom Rhein =

1954 film

- Directed by: Andrew Thorndike; Annelie Thorndike
- Distributed by: Deutsche Film (DEFA)
- Release date: 1954
- Running time: 76 minutes
- Country: East Germany
- Language: German

Die Sieben vom Rhein is an East German documentary film directed by Andrew and Annelie Thorndike. It was released in 1954. Thorndike made the film with his wife Annelie; it was made as part of the "Germans at the Same Table" campaign, and documented the visit of a West German workers delegation from the Ruhr to an East German steel factory in Riesa. According to author Bert Hogenkamp, "even political opponents had to admit that Andrew and Annelie Thorndike had made a masterpiece".
