= Bernard Paul (director) =

- Born: 14 March 1930; Paris, France
- Died: 6 December 1980 (aged 50); Paris, France
- Occupation: Film director
- Years active: 1956-1979

Bernard Paul (14 March 1930 – 6 December 1980) was a French film director and screenwriter.

He was the companion of the French actress Françoise Arnoul since 1964.

Worried by the problems of the proletarians, he realized in particular three social films:

- 1969: Time to Live (Le Temps de vivre), starring Marina Vlady, Frédéric de Pasquale, Catherine Allégret
- 1972: Handsome Face (Beau masque), starring Dominique Labourier, Luigi Diberti
- 1977: Last Exit Before Roissy (Dernière sortie avant Roissy), starring Pierre Mondy, Sabine Haudepin, Françoise Arnoul

Time to Live was entered into the 6th Moscow International Film Festival.
