= Musée national Boubou-Hama =

Museum in Niamey

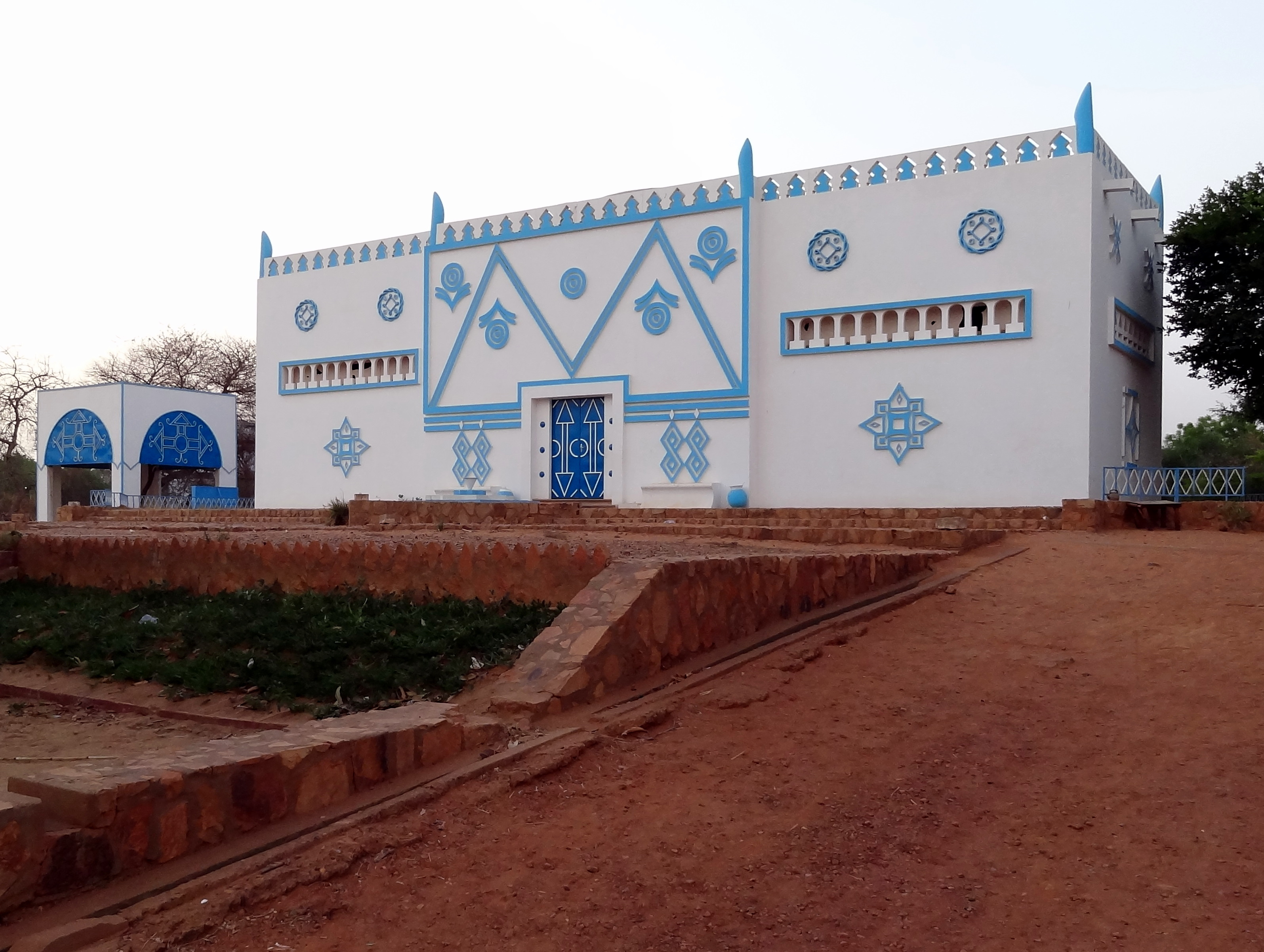

- Location in Niamey
- Established: December 18, 1959; 66 years ago
- Location: Niamey, Niger
- Coordinates: 13°30′40″N 2°06′25″E
- Visitors: 170,000/year (2013)

Musée national Boubou-Hama is the national museum of Niger, located in Niamey. It was founded on December 18, 1959 as Musée National du Niger. Its first conservator, Pablo Toucet, designed the concept of the museum, according to which it was part of the Culture Valley of Niamey, proposed by Boubou Hama. Adjacent to the museum, also part of the Valley, are the Franco-Nigerien Cultural Center and the Center of Linguistic and Historical Studies by Oral Tradition. The museum is located in a park, it consists of a cultural and a scientific section and a zoo. The museum also hosts temporary exhibitions. The park is popular as a recreational area.

One of the most famous exhibits is the Arbre du Ténéré, the remains of which have been in the Niger National Museum since 1974. Since 1979, the tree has been housed in its own mausoleum. The museum also includes a center for arts and crafts, a zoo with fifty species of animals, and five traditional houses belonging to the Fulani, Hausa, Songhai, Tuareg, and Zarma ethnic groups. The sculptor Issoufou Lankondé created a bust of Boubou Hama and sculptures of giraffes for the museum.

Most of the exhibits represent ethnological, archaeological, and cultural artifacts. In particular, the museum shows traditional dwellings of different Nigerien cultures.

As of 2013, 170,000 visitors visited the museum annually. The museum contains the remains of the Tree of Tenere.

The directors of the museum have been:

- Pablo Toucet (1959–1974);
- Albert Ferral (1974–1990);
- Mahamadou Kélessi (1990–1992);
- Mariama Hima (1992–1996);
- Mahamadou Kélessi (1996–1999);
- Chaïbou Néino (1999–present)
