= Du bist min (Ein deutsches Tagebuch) =

1969 film

- Directed by: Andrew Thorndike; Annelie Thorndike; Hans-Joachim Funk; Manfred Krause; Michael Englberger; Hans Joachim Manfred
- Cinematography: Ernst Oeltze; Christian Lehmann; Hermann Ihde; Siegfried Mogel; Siegfried Oschatz; Günter Ost; Alexander Westlin
- Release date: 1969
- Country: East Germany
- Language: German

Du bist min (Ein deutsches Tagebuch) is an East German film. It was released in 1969.
