= La Robe du temps =

- Directed by: Malam Saguirou
- Screenplay by: Malam Saguirou
- Produced by: Adalios
- Cinematography: Malam Saguirou, Salissou Rabé, Issoufou Magaji
- Edited by: François Pit
- Music by: Kané
- Release date: 2008
- Running time: 52 minutes
- Countries: France; Niger

La Robe du temps (The Gown of Time) is a 2008 film from Niger directed by Malam Saguirou, whose documentaries have won a number of international awards.

== Synopsis ==
In Zinder, the 2nd largest city in Niger, Ousseini is the young chief of the very traditional Brotherhood of Butchers. While trying to develop a channel for exporting beef from his region, he faces another challenge; he must legitimize his recently acquired role as a traditional chief while at the same time asserting his role as an innovator. The director follows the young Ousseini in his efforts. His movie summarizes the problems faced by young entrepreneurs, and provides a lesson in practical economics.

== Production ==
Saguirou attended the Berlinale Talent Campus in Berlin in 2006. The film was selected that year as a Berlinale documentary project. The film was a co-production between Dangarama of Niger and Adalios of France. As with most films made in Niger, the director was forced to be his own producer. The Fonds francophone de production audiovisuelle du Sud, which assists filmmakers in the southern Francophone region, helped with production.

== Festival screenings ==
The film was featured at the November 2008 Lumières d'Afrique festival in Besançon, France. It was shown at the Festival de Cine Africano in Córdoba, Spain. It was also featured at the 2009 "Lagunimages" Festival, which has been held in Cotonou, Benin every two years since 2000. The festival primarily showcases African audio visual works, and provides a forum for exchange of information between their makers and potential investors. The film was screened again at the 2009 Amiens International Film Festival and at the third Ciclo de Cine por la Paz festival at the Bellas Artes of Madrid.
