= Congo Calling =

- Directed by: Stephan Hilpert
- Written by: Stephan Hilpert
- Release dates: 17 January 2019 (Max Ophüls Prize Film Festival); 22 August 2019 (Germany)
- Running time: 90 minutes
- Countries: Germany; Belgium; Democratic Republic of the Congo
- Languages: French; German; English; Swahili

Congo Calling is a 2019 documentary film directed by Stephan Hilpert. The film follows three European development aid workers in the crisis-ridden eastern Congo, where they face various challenges and dilemmas in their attempts to help the local population. The film explores the coexistence and cooperation between Europe and Africa, and the question of how helpful the help of the West is.

The film features Raúl, a French-Spanish economist doing research on rebel groups; Peter, a German who has spent 30 years in Africa and is nearing retirement; and Anne-Laure, a Belgian whose Congolese partner becomes a high-profile regime critic after being imprisoned. The film shows their personal and professional struggles, as well as their interactions with the Congolese people, culture, and politics.

The film premiered at the Max Ophüls Prize Film Festival in Saarbrücken, Germany, in January 2019, where it won the Audience Award for Best Documentary. It also won awards at other film festivals, such as the DOK.fest Munich, the Filmkunstfest MV, and the African Diaspora Cinema Festival. It was released theatrically in Germany in August 2019, and in the UK in October 2021. It was also broadcast on German television in November 2019, and released on DVD and VOD in March 2020.

The film received positive reviews from critics, who praised its honest and nuanced portrayal of the complex realities of development aid in Congo. The film was also nominated for the German Documentary Award and the German Human Rights Film Award.
