= Niger '66: A Peace Corps Diary =

2010 Nigerien documentary film

- Directed by: Judy Erola
- Written by: Judy Erola
- Produced by: Judy Erola
- Production company: Neska Euskaldunaren Pelikula
- Distributed by: Neska Euskaldunaren Pelikula; The Cinema Guild
- Release date: 15 October 2010; (USA)
- Running time: 75 minutes
- Country: Niger
- Language: English

Niger '66: A Peace Corps Diary, is a 2010 Nigerien documentary film directed and produced by Judy Erola for Neska Euskaldunaren Pelikula. The film revolves around the inaugural Peace Corps group during President John F. Kennedy's 1960s-era call for volunteerism and U.S. in the turmoil of 1968 in Niger.

The film has been shot in California, USA. The film made its premier on 15 October 2010 in the United States. The film received mixed reviews from critics and made official selections in many film festivals: American Documentary Showcase 2011, Africa World Documentary Film Festival, 2011, Mill Valley International Film Festival, 2010 and Denver Starz International Film Festival, 2010.
