= Agadez, the Music and the Rebellion =

2010 Nigerien documentary musical drama film

- Directed by: Ron Wyman
- Written by: Jack McEnany
- Produced by: Ron Wyman; Van McLeod
- Starring: Omara Moctar; Jeremy Keenan; Thomas Seligman; Mohamed Serge
- Cinematography: Ron Wyman
- Edited by: Ron Wyman
- Music by: Chris Decato; Tunde Jegede
- Production company: Zero Gravity Films
- Release date: 14 October 2010 (New Hampshire)
- Running time: 75 minutes
- Country: Niger
- Language: English

Agadez, the Music and the Rebellion is a 2010 Nigerien documentary musical drama film directed by Ron Wyman and produced by Wyman and Van McLeod for Zero Gravity Films. The film features Omara "Bombino" Moctar, Jeremy Keenan, Thomas Seligman, and Mohamed Serge. The film is about Bombino, a young musician who became a cult hero in Niger that started to connect with Tuareg nomads' new generation.

The film premiered on 14 October 2010 at the New Hampshire Film Festival.
