= Aïcha Macky =

Nigerien filmmaker (born 1982)

- Born: Aïcha Macky; 8 January 1982 (age 44); Niger
- Education: Gaston Berger University
- Occupation: Director
- Years active: 2011–present

Aïcha Macky (born 8 January 1982) is a Nigerien filmmaker as well as a sociologist. She is most notable as the director of critically acclaimed documentary The Fruitless Tree.

== Personal life ==
She was born on 8 January 1982. When she was five years old, her mother died after childbirth. She obtained a Master I grade degree in Audiovisual and Creative Documentary at Institut de Formation aux Techniques de l'Information et de la Communication (Training Institute for Information and Communication Technologies: IFTIC) in Niger and later completed Master II grade degree in Sociology and in Documentary Filmmaking at Gaston Berger University in Sénégal in 2013.

== Career ==
In 2011, Macky made her debut short Moi et ma maigreur which was about the thin body perception of the Nigerien inhabitants. With the success of debut short, she made the second short Savoir faire le lit, which poses questions about conflict between mothers and daughters in Niger regarding sexual education. In 2016, she produced her maiden feature film L'Arbre sans fruit which focused on struggle of a woman with infertility, an adaptation of her real life. The film has critical acclaim and won over 50 prizes at festivals worldwide. It was later pre-purchased by Japan's NHK channel as well. In June 2016, the film won the documentary prize at the Africa Movie Academy Awards (AMAA).

Apart from filmmaking, she is also a teacher of teachers in mobile cinema. She guides youngsters to uplift the quality on short films about real conflicts in bordering countries such as Nigeria, Libya, Cameroon, Burkina Faso and Mali. She won a prize of the Alumni of Young African Leaders Initiative (YALI), which is an American program initiated by former president Barack Obama. Later she was awarded the title of Ordre des Arts et des Lettres by the French Republic's minister of culture for her dedication to the well being of Nigerien people and cinema.

Macky was promoted Knight of the Academic Palms of the Niger Republic then Knight of the Arts. She also worked as the Ambassador-designate of the Oasis Niger incubator center which is responsible for the Empowerment of Women and Girls. Meanwhile, she is a member of the International Committee for African Cinematographic Heritage (CPCA).

== Filmography ==
Year	Film	Role	Genre	Ref.
2011	Moi et ma maigreur (Me and My Thinness)	Director	Short film	
2013	Savoir faire le lit (Know How To Make The Bed)	Director	Short film	
2016	L'Arbre sans fruit (The Fruitless Tree)	Director	Documentary	
2021	Zinder	Director	Documentary	
