= Bon Voyage Sim =

- Directed by: Moustapha Alassane (animation)
- Screenplay by: Moustapha Alassane
- Produced by: Moustapha Alassane
- Cinematography: Moustapha Alassane
- Edited by: Moustapha Alassane
- Release date: 1966
- Running time: 5 minutes
- Country: Niger

Bon Voyage Sim is a 1966 animated film directed by pioneering African filmmaker Moustapha Alassane.

== Synopsis ==
Sim, the President of a Republic of Toads, goes on a journey invited by a neighboring president. This "jaunt is taken up with spectacles of transport, soldiers presenting arms, musicians playing military anthems, and a meeting that consists entirely of pleasantries and vague platitudes." This film, "a satirical animation on the pomp and grandeur of new African leaders of the time, is often cited as the first example of sub-Saharan African animation." It is reported that the original ending had Sim, upon his return, being dethroned and tossed in the water.
