= Andrew Thorndike =

German film director

- Born: 30 August 1909; Frankfurt, German Empire
- Died: 14 December 1979 (aged 70); East Berlin, East Germany
- Occupations: Film director, screenwriter
- Years active: 1949-1977

Andrew Thorndike (30 August 1909 – 14 December 1979) was a German documentary film director. He directed 16 films between 1949 and 1977. His 1950 documentary, Der Weg nach oben, won the Best Documentary Film at the Karlovy Vary International Film Festival in 1951. He was a member of the jury at the 5th Moscow International Film Festival. At the 11th Moscow International Film Festival in 1979, he was awarded the Honorable Prize for his contribution to cinema.

== Background ==
Thorndike was related to a Mayflower family who had settled in the United States. He grew up in a wealthy family on an estate in Senzig, outside of Berlin, the son of an advertising executive. Thorndike's father was on the board of Krupp. He received commercial training before becoming an employee of Ufa in 1931. Thorndike quickly became head of the firm's advertising film division.

Thorndike began working for the Supreme Command of the German Army and Navy beginning in 1941, where his job was to produce military training films. He also directed a documentary for Ufa, Die Herrin des Hofes (Mistress of the Farm), in 1942. During the war, Thorndike turned against the Nazi government and was accused of anti-government activities. He was forced into the German army and sent to the Eastern Front, where he was captured and taken to Russia as a prisoner of war in 1945. Upon his return to East Germany in 1948, he took a job with the state-run film studio DEFA, where he produced many propaganda films. His 1950 documentary, Der Weg nach oben, was his first feature-length film. A scathing critique of western involvement and economic-social problems in Western Germany in the post-war years, it won the Best Documentary Film at the Karlovy Vary International Film Festival in 1951.

Also in 1950, Thorndike met Annelie Kungik, a former schoolteacher, through their mutual work in films. He began collaborating with her and the two were married in 1953. After their marriage, Annilie began co-directing films with her husband. While at work on Stalin und das deutsche Volk (Stalin and the German People), he crossed into West Berlin and was subsequently arrested in March 1953. Thorndike was charged with aiding and abetting treason. His arrest created tensions between East and West Germany before he was released by the West German government. East German master spy Markus Wolf claims that until the time of his arrest in Berlin, Thorndike was an operative for the East German Foreign Intelligence Service and that the agency was trying to create inroads in Hamburg's economic and political spheres through him.

An East German newspaper claimed that the Thorndikes' 1956 documentary, Du und mancher Kamerad (You and Some Comrades), was positively received in the UK. The film was banned in West Germany and remained so some years after its release. Two of the couple's later films, Holiday on Sylt from 1957 and Operation Teutonic Sword from 1958, were banned in Britain by the British Board of Film Classification. Thorndike had his own production unit at DEFA, which was consolidated with DEFA-Gruppe 67 (DEFA-Group 67) in 1968, with Thorndike as the head of this project. During this time he founded the East German Film and Television Workers Guild which he remained in charge of until his death.

== Filmography ==
- Die Herrin des Hofes (Documentary short) (1942)
- Der 13. Oktober - 1. Der durchbrochene Kreis (Short) (1949)
- Von Hamburg bis Stralsund (Documentary short) (1950)
- Der Weg nach oben (Documentary) (1950)
- Wilhelm Pieck – Das Leben unseres Präsidenten (Documentary) (1950)
- Youth Sports Festival (Documentary) (1951)
- Die Prüfung (Documentary short) (1952)
- Die Sieben vom Rhein (Documentary) (1954)
- Die Novemberrevolution 1918 (Documentary short) (1956)
- Du und mancher Kamerad (Documentary) (1956)
- Der Fall Harzmann und andere (Documentary short) (1957)
- Holiday on Sylt (Documentary short) (1957)
- Operation Teutonic Sword (1958)
- Die Konzessionen des Mister Urquhart (TV Movie documentary) (1961)
- Das russische Wunder (Two-part documentary) (1964)
- Tito in Deutschland (Short) (1965)
- Du bist min – Ein deutsches Tagebuch (Documentary) (1969)
- Wladimir Iljitsch Uljanow Lenin (Documentary) (1970)
- Mein ganzes Leben lang (Documentary) (1971)
- Start (Documentary) (1972)
- Hier deutsche Volkspolizei (Documentary) (1972)
- Die alte neue Welt (Documentary) (1977)

== Bibliography ==
- Bock, Hans-Michael; Bergfelder, Tim (2009). The Concise Cinegraph: An Encyclopedia of German Cinema. Bergehahn Books. ISBN 978-1-57181-655-9.
- Childs, David (2014). The GDR (RLE: German Politics): Moscow's German Ally. Routledge. ISBN 978-1-31754-210-0.
- Davidson, John E.; Hake, Sabina (2007). Framing the Fifties:Cinema in a Divided Germany. Bergehahn Books. ISBN 978-1-84545-204-9.
- Silberman, Marc; Wrage, Henning (2014). DEFA at the Crossroads of East German and International Film Culture: A Companion. Walter de Gruyter GmbH & Co KG. ISBN 978-3-11027-345-8.
- Shaw, Tony (2006). British Cinema and the Cold War: The State, Propaganda and Consensus. I.B.Tauris. ISBN 978-1-84511-211-0.
- Wolf, Markus; McElvoy, Anne (1999). Man Without A Face: The Autobiography Of Communism's Greatest Spymaster. PublicAffairs. ISBN 978-0-78672-380-5.
