= Babatu =

1976 film

- Directed by: Jean Rouch
- Written by: Boubou Hama
- Cinematography: Jean Rouch
- Release date: 1976
- Country: Niger
- Language: French

Babatu is a 1976 Nigerien film directed by Jean Rouch. It was an official selection in the 1976 Cannes Film Festival.

== Cast ==
- Lam Dia
- Diama
- Oumarou Ganda
- Mariama
- Talou
- Damouré Zika
