= Bouzié =

1996 Franco-Ivorian short film

- Directed by: Jacques Trabi
- Written by: David Moreau; Jacques Trabi
- Produced by: Issa Serge Coelo
- Starring: Thérèse Sialou; Serge Touvolly; Michel Ibo; Madeleine Kouassy
- Cinematography: Pascal Poucet
- Edited by: Frédérique Veillard
- Music by: Yeplé Jazz
- Production company: Parenthese Films
- Release date: 31 December 1996; (French)
- Running time: 26 minutes
- Countries: France; Côte d'Ivoire
- Language: French

Bouzié, is a 1996 Franco-Ivorian short film directed by Jacques Trabi and produced by Issa Serge Coelo for Parenthese Films. The film stars Thérèse Sialou, Serge Touvolly, Michel Ibo, and Madeleine Kouassy. The film deals with Zébia, an African working in France, buys a plane ticket to Paris to his mother Bouzié to bring her to France and give her a comfortable life.

The film made its premier on 31 December 1996 in France. The film received positive reviews from critics. In 1997 at the Molodist International Film Festival, the film was nominated for the Best Short Fiction Film. In the same year, the film won the Best Short Film (Fiction) Award at the 15th Panafrican Film and Television Festival of Ouagadougou (FESPACO).

== Cast ==
- Thérèse Sialou
- Serge Touvolly
- Michel Ibo
- Madeleine Kouassy
