= The Fruitless Tree =

2016 Nigerien documentary film

- Directed by: Aïcha Macky
- Screenplay by: Aïcha Macky
- Story by: Aïcha Macky
- Produced by: Sani Elhadj Magori; Clara Vuillermoz
- Starring: Aïcha Macky
- Release date: 2016
- Running time: 52 minutes
- Country: Niger
- Languages: French; Hausa

The Fruitless Tree (L'arbre sans fruit) is a Nigerien bilingual documentary film written and directed by Aïcha Macky on her directorial debut. The documentary project was influenced and inspired by the death of director's own mother who died when the director was only five years old at the time. The documentary won the Africa Movie Academy Award for Best Documentary at the 12th Africa Movie Academy Awards in 2016.

== Cast ==
- Aïcha Macky as herself

== Synopsis ==
The director who is a married woman without any children in real life, confronts the issue of infertility which is a concern in Niger. She shares a collection of stories about wives and husbands who refuse to be tested.
