= Daniel Taye Workou =

German-Ethiopian film director

- Born: 6 June 1969 (age 57); Berlin
- Education: Columbia University
- Occupations: Film director, film producer, screenwriter
- Years active: 2000-present

Daniel Taye Workou (born 6 June 1969) is a German-Ethiopian film director, film producer, and screenwriter.

== Biography ==
Workou is a German-Ethiopian born in Berlin. He studied international relations and worked for several non-governmental organizations. Workou later decided to enter the film industry and joined the Graduate Film Program at Columbia University. In his early career, he directed music documentaries, videos and concert films. These include Peace Concert in the Hague in 2000. In 2003, Workou directed the documentary A Sangomar Boure.

Workou directed his first short fictional film, Menged, in 2006. It was filmed near his grandfather'a village in Ethiopia. The story concerns a father and son returning from the market in the countryside. Menged premiered at the "Directors Fortnight" of the Cannes International Film Festival received the Best Short Film Award at the Panafrican Film and Television Festival of Ouagadougou, won Best Short Film "Crystal Bear" at the Berlin International Film Festival, and the Special Jury Award and SIGNIS Award at Amiens.

Workou is the cofounder of BiraBiro Films, located in Addis Ababa specialized in international co-productions. In 2014, he served as the producer for L' éclat furtif de l'ombre. Workou was a co-producer for the post-apocalyptic film Crumbs in 2015, directed by his friend Miguel Llansó. In 2019, he was a producer for the action comedy/sci-fi film Jesus Shows You the Way to the Highway, directed by Llansó.

== Filmography ==
- 2000: Peace Concert in the Hague (director)
- 2003: A Sangomar Boure (director)
- 2005: Carjackin (short film; writer)
- 2006: Menged (short film; writer/director)
- 2009: Woinshet (short film; executive producer)
- 2010: Where Is My Dog? (short film; co-executive producer)
- 2013: The Wild Years (associate producer)
- 2014: L'éclat furtif de l'ombre (executive producer)
- 2015: Crumbs (co-producer)
- 2015: Der weiße Äthiopier (service producer)
- 2019: Jesus Shows You the Way to the Highway (executive producer/producer/actor)
