= La Colère dans le vent =

2016 Nigerien documentary film

- Directed by: Amina Weira
- Written by: Amina Weira
- Story by: Amina Weira
- Produced by: VraiVrai Films
- Cinematography: Tarek Sami
- Edited by: Agnès Gaudet
- Music by: Abdoulaye Mato
- Production company: VraiVrai Films
- Distributed by: VraiVrai Films
- Release date: 1 April 2016; (France)
- Running time: 108 minutes
- Country: Niger
- Language: Afrikaans
- Budget: €50,000 (estd.)

La Colère dans le vent is a 2016 Nigerien documentary film directed by Amina Weira and produced by VraiVrai Films.

The film deals with the mining of uranium in Areva city since 1976 and the resulting population loss due to high radioactivity in that area.

The film premiered on 1 April 2016 in France. The film received mixed reviews from critics and screened at many film festivals.
