= Akounak Tedalat Taha Tazoughai =

2015 Niger drama musical film

- Directed by: Christopher Kirkley
- Written by: Christopher Kirkley
- Produced by: Sahel Sounds; L'Improbable; Tenere Films
- Starring: Mdou Moctar; Kader Tanoutanoute; Rhaicha Ibrahim; Abdoulaye Souleymane
- Cinematography: Jérôme Fino
- Edited by: Sara El Rhazoui; Jérôme Fino; Christopher Kirkley
- Music by: Mdou Moctar
- Release date: 29 January 2015 (USA)
- Running time: 75 min.
- Country: Niger
- Language: Tamasheq

Akounak Tedalat Taha Tazoughai, (English: Rain the Color of Blue with A Little Red In It), is a 2015 Niger drama musical film directed by Christopher Kirkley and co–produced by Sahel Sounds, L'Improbable and Tenere Films. It is the world's first Tuareg-language fiction film. The film is based on the real life incidents of famous musician Mdou Moctar.

The film was shot at Agadez, Niger. It received positive reviews and won several awards at international film festivals. It is a homage to Prince’s 1984 rock drama Purple Rain.

== Cast ==
- Mdou Moctar as himself
- Kader Tanoutanoute as Kader
- Fatimata Falo as Mother
- Rhaicha Ibrahim as Rhaicha
- Ahmoudou Madassane as Ahmoudou
- Abdoulaye Souleymane as Father
