= Sektou =

- Directed by: Khaled Benaissa
- Screenplay by: Khaled Benaissa
- Produced by: Patio Prod.
- Starring: Hichem Mesbah, Zahir Bouzrar, Kamel Bouakez, Nabil Lassel
- Cinematography: Mohammed Soudani
- Edited by: Malik Benyounes
- Music by: Mourad Guechoudi
- Release date: 2008
- Running time: 15'
- Country: Algeria

Sektou (Arabic: سكتو) is a 2008 Algerian film.

== Synopsis ==
Smain works on nighttime radio show. He goes home at dawn hoping to go to bed. But that bed is on the third floor of a busy street in downtown Alger. The city starts to awaken. For Smain to sleep is a dream, to awaken a nightmare.

== Awards ==
- Poulain d’Or FESPACO 2009
- Taghit d’Or 2008
