= La Rançon d'une alliance =

- Directed by: Sébastien Kamba
- Written by: Sébastien Kamba
- Produced by: Sébastien Kamba, Ministère de la Coopération Français
- Release date: 1974
- Running time: 95 minutes
- Country: Republic of the Congo
- Languages: Kituba, Lingala

La Rançon d'une alliance (English title: The Ransom of an Alliance) is a 1974 Congolese drama film directed by Sébastien Kamba.

== Plot ==
Two tribes, the Tsembo and the Tsoundi, have an alliance in pre-colonial Congo after years of contentious struggle. The son and daughter of the tribes' rulers are married to cement the alliance. Years later however, the wife, Hakoula, has an affair with a handsome slave. Bizenga, the slave, was killed on the spot. This infidelity sparks a devastating war between the tribes with a great deal of bloodshed. The son of Hakoula manages to end the war and free all the slaves. This allows a modern society emphasizing freedom and liberty to form, disregarding past traditions.

== Production ==
The film is an adaptation of the novel La légende de Mfoumou Ma Mazono by Jean Malonga. It was director Sébastien Kamba's first feature film, as he had previously been known for his documentary work, and addressed the taboo subject of African slavery. It was also the first film to be produced in the Republic of the Congo after independence. La rançon d'une alliance was shot in the languages of Kituba and Lingala. It was produced by Kamba and the Ministère de la Coopération Français. Though it is fiction, the film is based on actual history.

== Release and reception ==
In November 1978, the film premiered in the United States at the Museum of Modern Art in New York. It was generally well received. Black African Cinema by Nwachukwu Frank Ukadike called it "a bold cinematic evaluation of traditional mores, it nevertheless lacks the kind of spirit of filmic innovation that might influence or induce other Black African filmmakers to reassess their film styles."
