= Sébastien Kamba =

Nigerien filmmaker

- Born: Sébastien Kamba; 25 December 1941 (age 84); Brazzaville, Republic of Congo
- Occupations: Director, producer, screenwriter, cinematographer
- Years active: 1964–present

Sébastien Kamba (born 25 December 1941), is a Congolese filmmaker. One of the pioneer filmmakers in Congolese film industry, he has directed short films with the collaboration with French filmmakers.

== Personal life ==
He was born on 25 December 1941 in Brazzaville, Republic of Congo.

== Career ==
He moved to France, and studied at the Office for Radiophonic Cooperation. Later he received a television internship in Paris and also as a teacher. In 1964, Kamba made the first Congolese fiction film, a political short film Le Peuple du Congo-Léo vaincra. It was produced with the collaboration with a television media.

In 1966, he made the short Kaka yo and then the short Mwana keba in 1970. In 1973, Kamba directed the first feature film in the Republic of Congo: La Rançon d'une alliance, adapted from the novel 'La légende de Mfoumou Ma Mazono' by Jean Malonga. In 1992, he published the book Cinématographique et Parti Unique (Cinematographic Production and Unique Party. The example of Congo).

On 1 February 2019, the 1st edition of the Congolese cinema excellence trophies was titled "Les Kamba's Awards" in honor of Kamba was held in Brazzaville.

== Filmography ==
Year	Film	Role	Genre	Ref.
1964	Le Peuple du Congo-Léo vaincra (The People of Congo-Léo will win)	Director	Short film	
1966	Kaka Yo (Nothing But You)	Director, cinematographer, screenwriter	Short film	
1970	Mwana Keba	Director	Short film	
1970	Festival panafricain d'Alger (Panafrican Festival of Algiers)	Director	Documentary	
1974	La Rançon d'une alliance (The Ransom of an Alliance)	Director	Feature film	
1977	Le corps et l'esprit(The Body and The Spirit)	Director	Film	
1985	Cop's Honour	Administrative assistant	Film	
