= Zalika Souley =

Nigerien actress (1947–2021)

- Born: 7 October 1947
- Died: 27 July 2021 (aged 73)
- Occupation: actress
- Years active: 1947 - 2021
- Notable work: Le Retour d'un aventurier

Zalika Souley (7 October 1947 – 27 July 2021) was a Nigerien actress, the first sub-Saharan movie actress, and one of the pioneering actresses of African cinema.

== Life ==
Aged 19, Zalika played the lead female role in Moustapha Alassane's 1966 film Le Retour d'un aventurier. Most of her later work was for Oumarou Ganda: Cabascabo (1968), Le Wazzou polygame (1971), Saïtane (1972) and L'Exilé (1980). She also acted in Moustapha Alassane's Women Cars Villas Money (1972), in Yeo Kozoloa's Petanqui (1983) and Djingarey Maïga's Aube noire (1983).

Zalika enjoyed the trappings of wealth and fame, achieving notoriety for public behaviour then considered provocative, such as dressing in trousers. However, the Nigerien film industry declined from the 1980s onwards. Rahmatou Keïta's 2004 documentary Al'lessi... An African Actress portrays Souley's life. By the time Keïta made her film, Souley and her four children were living in a two-roomed house in Niamey, without food or water. The film ended with the information that Zalika was now in Europe working as a maid, after she was forced to emigrate in 2000.
