= Le Retour d'un aventurier =

1966 film

- Directed by: Moustapha Alassane
- Screenplay by: Moustapha Alassane
- Produced by: Moustapha Alassane
- Starring: Zalika Souley, Djingarey Maïga, Moussa Harouna, Ibrahim Yacouba, Abdou Nani
- Cinematography: Moustapha Alassane
- Edited by: Philippe Luzuy
- Music by: Nelos Amelonion
- Release date: 1966
- Running time: 34'
- Country: Niger

Le Retour d'un aventurier is a 1966 pop art film. In this African-style Western, director Moustapha Alassane delves into African mimicry. The film won an award at the World Festival of Black Arts in Dakar in 1966. The debut of actor Zalika Souley, who plays the only woman amidst a band of Nigerien cowboys, also makes the film notable.

== Synopsis ==
A man returns home to his village with Western cowboy duds, and forms a gang with his old buddies. Getting into their role, the black cowboys spread panic throughout the village with brawls and robberies.
