= Mariama Hima =

Nigerien film director and diplomat

- Born: 20 February 1951 (age 75); Niamey
- Citizenship: Niger
- Occupations: Film director, Anthropologist, Diplomat, Politician

Mariama Hima Yankori (born 1951, Niamey) is a Nigerien film director, ethnologist and politician. She became the first female Nigerien film director in the 1980s, was State Secretary of Promotion of Women and Protection of Children, and later the first female Nigerien ambassador to France.

== Early life ==
Hima was born in Niamey in 1951 and studied locally until she achieved a bachelor's degree. In 1973, she left for France and studied ethnolinguistics at the École pratique des hautes études in Paris. She got her PhD in 1989 from the University Paris X in anthropology.

== Cinematic and political career ==
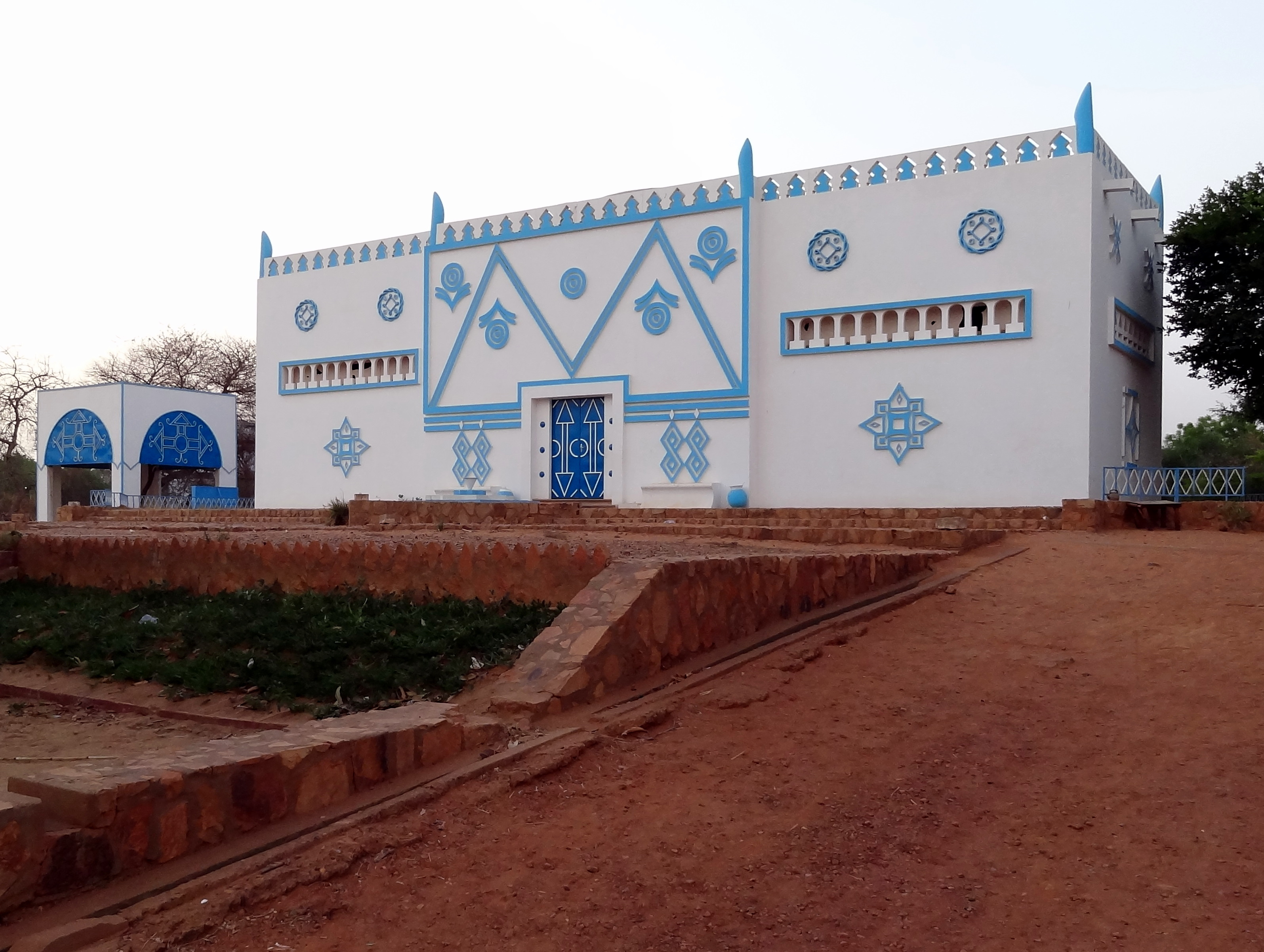
Building at the National Museum in Niamey, where Hima was the director from 1992 to 1996.

In the 1980s and 1990s she shot five documentary films, becoming the first female Nigerien film director.

After shooting most of her films, Hima worked in total over a decade as a conservator at the National Museum of Niger in Niamey, where between 1992 and 1996 she served as the director. In 1990, she was designated the national Director of Culture.

In 1996, Hima was appointed the State Secretary of Promotion of Women and Protection of Children by president Ibrahim Baré Maïnassara. Subsequently, she became Minister of Social Development of Niger.

In 1997, she was appointed the ambassador of Niger in France, becoming the first female Nigerien ambassador. Despite Maïnassara's death during the 1999 military coup, she remained the ambassador in Paris until 2003.

Hima is the Chevalier and the Grand Officier of the National Order of Merit and the Commandeur of the Ordre des Palmes Académiques. As of 2013, she had no Nigerien decorations.

== Filmography ==
Hima's films are documentaries, focused on artisans working in Niamey. They have been awarded prizes at international film festivals, including Venice and Beaubourg.

- 1984: Baabu Banza (Rien ne se jette), documentary, 20 minutes
- 1985: Falaw (L’aluminium), documentary, 16 minutes
- 1986: Toukou (Le tonneau), documentary
- 1987: Katako (Les planches), documentary
- 1994: Hadiza et Kalia, documentary
