= Toula ou Le génie des eaux =

- Directed by: Moustapha Alassane
- Written by: Moustapha Alassane
- Produced by: RTF Banca del Niger
- Starring: Solange Delanne; Isaa Bania; Parfait Kondo; Sotigui Kouyaté; Damouré Zika
- Cinematography: Moustapha Alassane, Bernd Rühe
- Edited by: Danièle Tessier
- Music by: Sotigui Kouyaté
- Distributed by: Marfilmes
- Release date: 1973
- Running time: 76 minutes
- Country: Niger
- Language: French

Toula ou Le génie des eaux is a 1973 drama film directed by Moustapha Alassane.

== Synopsis ==
The gods have cursed the country with a drought. There seems to be no hope. A holy man summoned by the king demands the sacrifice of a young woman to appease to the gods. Toula is chosen to be sacrificed. A young man in love who is in love with Toula goes in search of water to save his beloved from her fate, but when he returns with good news, he finds that he is too late: Toula has already disappeared in the holy swamp and the gods have been thus appeased.

Moustapha Alassane tackles the issue of the drought in Niger through a traditional story. The film was forbidden for some time in Niger.

Based on a Boubou Hama novel.

== Festivals ==
- Semaine de la solidarieté international, France (2011)
- 15th Film Festival of Kerala, India (2010)
- Paris Cinéma, France (2005)
- FCAT - Festival de Cine Africano, Spain (2005)

== Awards ==
- Sidney Award's, 1st American Black Film Festival, U.S.A. (1977)

== Bibliography ==
- Cinémas d'Afrique, Éditions Khartala, 2000, p. 32
