= Malam Saguirou =

Film director from Niger

- Born: Malam Ibrahim Mahaman Saguirou
- Citizenship: Nigerien
- Occupation: filmmaker
- Notable work: La Robe du temps

Malam Ibrahim Mahaman Saguirou is a filmmaker from Niger. His documentaries have won various international prizes.

== Career ==
In 2002 Saguirou found work at Stage IFTIC Contrechamps, Niger. He moved to Africadoc, Dakar in 2004. In 2005 he was an intern at Moppan in Jos, Nigeria, and the same year worked at Cinédoc in Annecy, France. He was writer-director for the film producer Kutus from 2005 to January 2007. He attended the Berlinale Talent Campus in Berlin in 2006. Saguirou founded the Dangarama company in March 2007.

== Work ==
Saguirou became known when the first African Forum of Documentary Film in December 2006 screened his Un Africain a Annecy (an African in Annecy), a candid look at a young African discovering Western society during his first trip to France. His second film, La chèvre qui broute, je mange, tu manges (the Goat grazing, I eat, you eat) deals with the sensitive issue of corruption in Niger. Pour le Meilleur et pour l'Oignon! (For the Best and for the Onion! - 2008) is a documentary about marriage and the role of food in the culture of Niger. It tells of the pressure on a young onion farmer to produce more to gain the money required to marry. The obstacle-filled path of Ousseini, traditional chief of the butchers' guild of Zinder, is the theme of his 2008 film La Robe du temps (The Robe of time). In these two films Saguirou was forced to be his own producer due to the lack of funding endemic in the film industry on his country.

== Filmography ==
Saguirou's films include:

Year	Title	Company	Role
2011	Ah ! Les Indigents	Dangarama	Director
2008	La Robe du temps	Adalios/Dangarama	Director, writer, director of Photography
2008	Pour le Meilleur et pour l'Oignon!	Adalios/Dangarama/Les Films du Kutus/TV Rennes 35	Producer, director of Photography
2006	Un Africain a Annecy	Cinédoc films	Director
2005	Le Chasseur de Vent	Les Films du Kutus	Director, producer, writer
