= Le Wazzou polygame =

- Opening title
- Directed by: Oumarou Ganda
- Release date: 1971
- Running time: 50 minutes
- Countries: Niger; France
- Language: Zarma

Le Wazzou polygame (also known as Polygamic Wazzou or The Polygamist's Morale) is a 1971 Nigerien/French film about polygamy directed by and starring Oumarou Ganda. It was produced by Argos Films in France. It won the Grand Prize at the 1972 Panafrican Film and Television Festival of Ouagadougou and was the first official winner of that festival.

== Cast ==
- Oumarou Ganda
- Joseph Salamatou
- Zalika Souley
- Garba Mamane
- Amadou Seyni
- Ousmane Diop

== See also ==
- Polygamy in Niger
