= Djingarey Maïga =

Mali-born Nigerien film director

- Born: Djingarey Alhassane Maïga; 17 October 1939 (age 86); Ouatagouna, Mali
- Occupations: Director, Actor, Photographer, Assistant director, Assistant, Camera operator
- Years active: 1966–present

Djingarey Alhassane Maïga (born 17 October 1939), is a Mali-born Nigerien film director and actor. He is best known for the animation works such as Black Barbie. He is also worked as a photographer, assistant director, assistant, camera operator.

== Personal life ==
He was born on 17 October 1939 in Ouatagouna, Mali. After completing education, Maïga moved to Niamey, Niger.

== Career ==
After moving to Niger, he worked as an electricity reader for the energy company "SAFELEC", which later became Compagnie Nigérienne d'Electricité (NIGELEC). In early 1960s, his passion towards cinema arose during the pioneering days of Nigerien film. In 1966, he got the opportunity to play the leading role in the western film Le retour d'un aventurier directed by Moustapha Alassane. After that, Maïga acted in many of Alassane's feature films such as FVVA: Femme, Voiture, Villa, Argent (1972). When the films became popular, Maïga quit from his job at "SAFELEC" in 1971. Then he worked as the assistant director for Moustapha Alassane.

In 1972, Maïga made his first directorial work Le ballon. In the film, his eldest son, who was six at the time, played the leading role. Then in 1976, he directed his maiden feature film L'étoile noire. In this film, Alassane, Damouré Zika and himself also made acting credentials. Several of his films are linked in terms of content as série noire ("black series"). [1] The black that these films have in the title stands for sadness and unhappiness in Africa.

== Filmography ==
Year	Film	Role	Genre	Ref.
1966	Le retour d'un aventurier	Actor	Film	
1969	Cabascabo	Actor	Film	
1972	FVVA: Femme, villa, voiture, argent	Actor	Film	
1972	Le ballon	Director	Film	
1976	L'étoile noire	Director	Film	
1976	L'étoile noire	Actor	Film	
1978	Ouatagouna	Director	Film	
1979	Autour de l'hippopotame	Director	Film	
1979	Nuages noirs	Director	Film	
1980	Les rendez-vous du 15 avril	Director	Film	
1982	La danse des dieux	Director	Film	
1983	Aube noire	Director	Film	
1986	Le médecin de Gafire	Actor	Film	
1994	Miroir noir	Director, Script, Camera operator	Film	
1999	Vendredi noir	Director	Film	
2002	Le rêve plus fort que la mort	Camera operator	Film	
2009	La quatrième nuit noire	Director	Film	
2014	Au plus loin dans le noir	Director	Film	
2019	Un coin du ciel noir	Director	Film	
