= Cabascabo =

1968 film

- Directed by: Oumarou Ganda
- Written by: Oumarou Ganda
- Starring: Oumarou Ganda
- Cinematography: Toussaint Bruschini
- Release date: 1968
- Running time: 45 minutes
- Country: Niger
- Language: Zarma

Cabascabo is a 1968 Nigerien-French drama film directed by Oumarou Ganda. It was entered into the 6th Moscow International Film Festival, where it won a Diploma.

== Cast ==
- Oumarou Ganda as Cabascabo
- Zalika Souley as Hawa
- Balarabi
- Issa Gombokoye
- Kaka
- Dan Baba Ali
- Gérard Delassus
- Van Borel
