= Moustapha Alassane =

Nigerien filmmaker (1942–2015)

- Born: 1942; N'Dounga (French West Africa)
- Died: 17 March 2015; Ouagadougou (Burkina Faso)
- Occupation: Film director

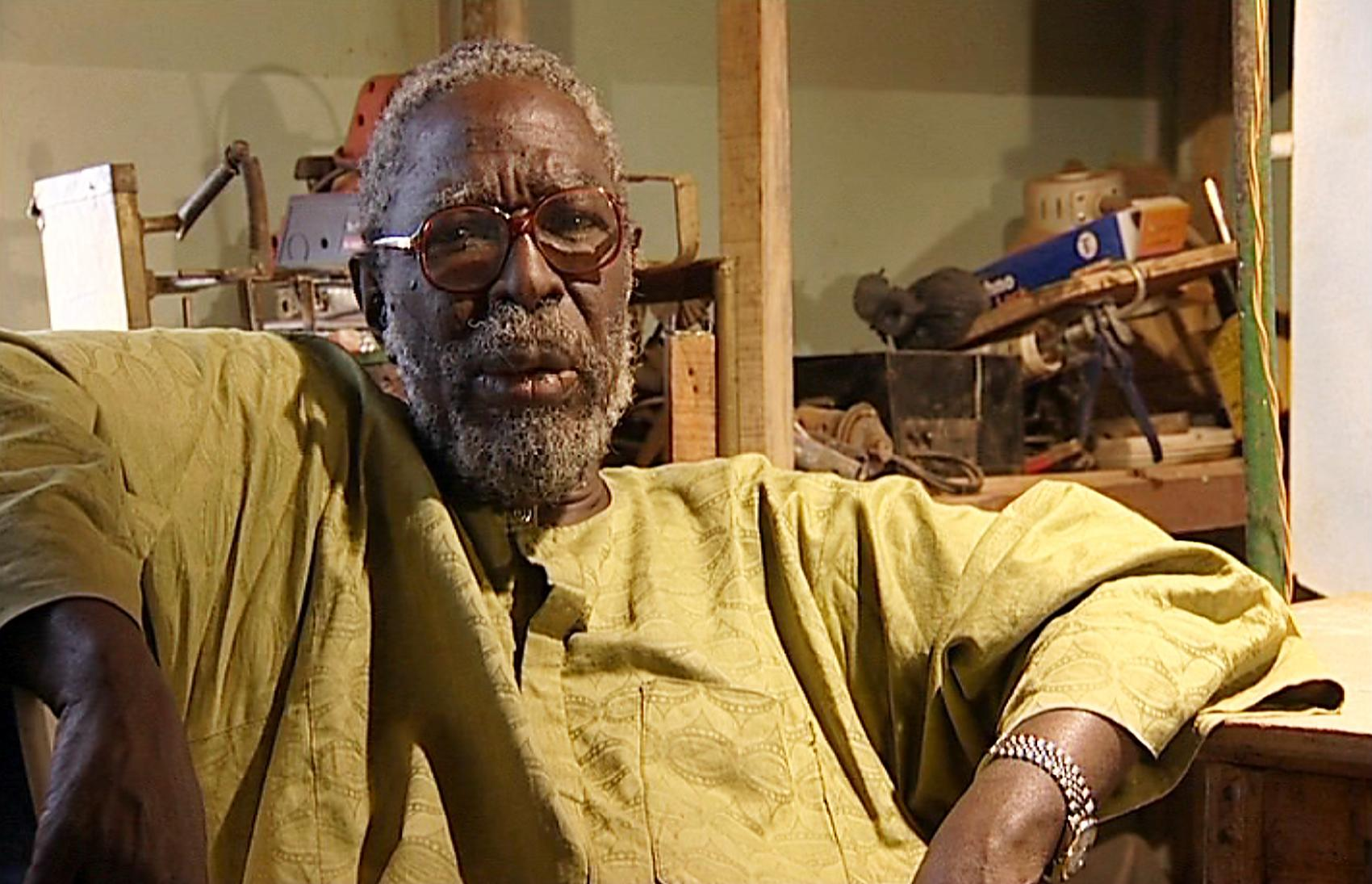

Moustapha Alassane (1942–17 March 2015) was a Nigerien filmmaker who is often hailed as the "father' of African film animation.

== Biography ==
Moustapha Alassane was born in the year 1942 in N’Dougou (Niger). He initially graduated with a degree in mechanics but discovered the art of film before he followed that career path. It was at the Rouch Institute for Research and Human Sciences in Niamey where he learned the cinematographic technique and thereafter became one of its main proponents. Jean Rouch provided for Alassane's education and accommodation in Canada, where he met the famous Norman McLaren, who taught him about animation.

He was the creator of the first animated films of the sub-Saharan Africa, also directing documentaries and fiction films. He was Head of Cinema Department at the Niamey University for 15 years.

Moustapha Alassane directed, in 1962, two shorts inspired in traditional tales: Aoure and La Bague du roi Koda. Representing African culture (e.g. in Deela ou el Barka le conteur, 1969, and Abimbola ou Shaki, 1973), Alassane also employed moral satire (F.V.V.A., femme, villa, voiture, argent, 1972), denouncing the thirst for power for “new wealth” in Africa. Social criticism and black humour are in almost all of his films. Le Retour d'un aventurier (1966) is considered the first African western. The debut of actor Zalika Souley, who plays the only woman amidst a band of Nigerien cowboys, also makes the film notable. The film won an award at the World Festival of Black Arts in Dakar in 1966.

The frog was Alassane's favourite animal and protagonist of most of his animated films, because Alassane believed it is funnier to animate frogs rather than humans. To work, Alassane used several materials, such as wood, metal or wire, glue, fabric or sponge. His workshop was based in Tahoua.

Numerous retrospectives of Alassane's career have been made in several international film festivals, including the MoMA in 2017. Samba le Grand was restored in 2K in 2019 by NYU Tisch, in association with Villa Albertine – French Embassy in the United States and the Cinémathèque Afrique of the Institut Français. Alassane was widely considered to be an important figure in African cinema and animation. Despite this, his films weren't seen very often, mainly popping up in Niger festivals and occasionally at international festivals.

Moustapha Alassane was made a Knight of the Legion of Honour at the Cannes Film Festival in 2007.

== Filmography ==
=== As director ===
- 1962: La Bague du roi Koda
- 1962: Aoure
- 1962: La Pileuse de Mil
- 1962: Le piroguier
- 1964: L’arachide de Santchira
- 1965: La mort de Ghandji
- 1966: Le Retour d'un aventurier
- 1966: Bon Voyage Sim
- 1967: Malbaza
- 1969: Les contre Bandiers
- 1969: Deela ou el Barka le Conteur
- 1971: Jamyya
- 1972: Women Cars Villas Money a.k.a. F.V.V.A.: Femme, Voiture, Villa, Argent
- 1973: Abimbola ou Shaki
- 1973: Siberi
- 1974: Soubane
- 1974: Toula ou Le génie des eaux
- 1975: Zaboa
- 1977: Samba le Grand
- 1982: Agwane mon Village
- 1982: Kankamba ou le semeur de discorde
- 1982: Gourimou
- 2000: Soolo
- 2000: Adieu Sim
- 2001: Les magiciens de l'Ader
- 2001: Agaïssa
- 2001: Kokoa
- 2003: Tagimba

=== As actor ===
- 1971: Petit à petit (Moustaphe)
- 1976: L'Étoile noire

=== As writer ===
- 1974: Toula ou Le génie des eaux

== Films about Moustapha Alassane ==
- Animation et creation: Univers du cinema de Moustapha Alassane (2002), documentary directed by Debra S. Boyd
- Moustapha Alassane, cinéaste du possible (2009), documentary directed by Silvia Bazzoli and Christian Lelong.
