= Oumarou Ganda =

Nigerien film director

- Born: 1935; Niamey, Niger
- Died: 1 January 1981 (aged 45–46); Niamey, Niger
- Citizenship: Nigerien
- Occupations: Film director, actor, screenwriter
- Years active: 1958-1980
- Notable work: Cabascabo

Oumarou Ganda (1935 – 1 January 1981) was a Nigerien director and actor who helped bring African cinema to international attention in the 1960s and 1970s.

== Life ==
Ganda was born in Niamey, the capital of Niger, in 1935 and was of Djerma ethnicity. He completed his primary studies in Niamey and at the age of 16 joined the French Far East Expeditionary Corps as a soldier from 1951 to 1955. After spending two years in Asia during the First Indochina War he returned to Niger, where he was unable to find work. He emigrated to Côte d'Ivoire and became a longshoreman in the port of Abidjan. There he met French anthropologist and filmmaker Jean Rouch. Rouch was interested in the Nigerien community in Côte d'Ivoire and hired Ganda as a statistician for his research on immigration.

It was Rouch who introduced Ganda to the cinema. Ganda had a small role in Rouch's 1957 film Zazouman de Treichville, and the lead role in Moi, un Noir (I, a Negro) in 1958. A few years later he returned to Niamey, where he became involved in the Franco-Nigerien Cultural Center. In the Center's Culture and Cinema club he met technicians who offered training in directing, camera, and sound, and he became an assistant technician. The club produced several films, and in 1968 organized a screenplay contest, for which Ganda wrote the script of his first film, Cabascabo, based on his experiences in Indochina. He continued making films throughout the 1970s, many of which received international acclaim and were vehicles of social commentary in what was then a single party state. His most famous, Le Wazzou Polygame (1970) won the first FESPACO Film Festival Best Film Award. In addition to his dramatic films, Ganda completed several documentaries and was working on one at the time of his death of a heart attack on January 1, 1981.

=== Posthumous honors ===
Among his posthumous honors, a major cultural center, performance, and library complex in Niamey, Le Centre Culturel Oumarou GANDA (C.C.O.G) was named for him in 1981, shortly after his death.

As the winner of the Best Film award at the first annual FESPACO film festival, upon his death FESPACO began awarding an African Feature Film Award named the Oumarou Ganda Prize.

== Films ==
- Cabascabo (1968, 45 minutes, black and white, filmed entirely in the Zarma language) Autobiographical film that deals with Ganda's service in the French Expeditionary Corps in Indochina. A young soldier sees his comrades die in battle for a cause completely foreign to them. Cabascabo premiered in Paris in 1968 and was also shown at Cannes. It won a Diploma at the 6th Moscow International Film Festival, the international critics' prize at Málaga, and an honorable mention at the Carthage Film Festival.
- Le Wazzou Polygame (1970, 50 minutes, 16 mm, color, Zarma language) Ganda's second film deals with polygamy and forced marriage. The films is critical of Nigerien society and those who hold power in Africa. Among other awards, it received the first FESPACO grand prize in 1972.
- Saïtane (1972, 64 minutes, 16 mm, color, Zarma language) Another film of social criticism in which a marabout serves as a go-between for an adulterous woman and her wealthy lover.
- L'Exilé (1980, 90 minutes, 16mm, color) Inspired by an African folk tale. The use of folk tales as inspiration is one of Ganda's significant contributions to African cinema.
