= Aï Keïta =

Burkinabe actress

Aï Keïta Yara
- Citizenship: Burkina Faso
- Occupation: Actress
- Employer: Yalgado National Hospital Center
- Notable work: Sarraounia

Aï Keïta Yara is a Burkinabé actress who played the lead role in the 1986 film Sarraounia.

== Career ==
Her first movie was Sarraounia (1986), where she played Sarraounia, the queen the movie is named after. Sarraounia won several awards, after which she was able to act in more movies and television shows, including the 2004 comedy-drama Tasuma. She has appeared in about 30 films including the 1995 film Haramuya and the 2018 film The Three Lascars (French: Les trois lascars).

As of 2011, she was working as a civil servant processing medical records at Yalgado National Hospital Center in Ouagadougou.

== Personal life ==
Keïta is married with two children, and speaks Fula, Dyula, Mooré, Zarma and French.

Her maternal grandfather was born in Senegal, before travelling to Burkina Faso with his first wife. When he arrived in Burkina Faso he married a woman from the village of Mardaga in Tapoa Province who later became Keïta's maternal grandmother.
