= Sarraounia (film) =

- Directed by: Med Hondo
- Written by: Med Hondo; Abdoulaye Mamani
- Produced by: Med Hondo
- Starring: Aï Keïta
- Cinematography: Guy Famechon
- Edited by: Marie-Thérèse Boiché
- Music by: Pierre Akendengué; Abdoulaye Cissé; Issouf Compaore
- Production company: Les Films Soleil O
- Release date: 26 November 1986 (France)
- Running time: 120 minutes
- Countries: Burkina Faso; Mauritania; France
- Languages: Dioula, Fula, French
- Budget: $3,000,000

Sarraounia is a 1986 historical drama film written and directed by Med Hondo. It is based on a novel of the same name by Nigerien author Abdoulaye Mamani, who co-wrote the screenplay. The novel and film concern the real-life Battle of Lougou between Azna (remnant animist-Hausa people) queen Sarraounia and the advancing French Colonial Forces of the Voulet–Chanoine Mission in 1899. Sarraounia was one of the few African tribal leaders that resisted the advances of French expansionists Paul Voulet and Julien Chanoine. The film won the first prize at the Panafrican Film and Television Festival of Ouagadougou (FESPACO) and was critically well received.

== Synopsis ==
The film takes place in Niger and the surrounding region of the Sahel. The film begins with the initiation and establishment of a young girl as queen of the Aznas. The young queen, Sarraounia, becomes an accomplished warrior when she defends her tribe from an enemy tribe. Accomplished in archery and herbalism, she is a renowned sorceress. Meanwhile, French colonialists Paul Voulet and Julien Chanoine set out to conquer new lands for the French colonial empire. As they advance across the land they rape women and leave burning villages in their wake.

== Cast ==
- Aï Keïta as Sarraounia
- Jean-Roger Milo as Capitaine Voulet
- Féodor Atkine as Chanoine
- Didier Sauvegrain as Doctor Henric
- Roger Miremont as Lieutenant Joalland
- Luc-Antoine Diquéro as Lt. Pallier
- Jean-Pierre Castaldi as Sergeant Boutel

== Production ==
When Nigerien author Abdoulaye Mamani first published his novel Sarraounia, he gave a copy to his friend Med Hondo who decided to put aside all other projects to adapt it into a film. As well as using the book for reference, Hondo conducted research with Mamani, interviewing older Nigerien people and accessing material in the national archives.

Hondo cast Aï Keïta after witnessing a confrontation between Keïta and a family member. Although he initially had her in mind for a small role in the film, he cast her as Sarraounia following the first casting session. This was her first acting job and she has since performed in films including Les Etrangers (The Foreigners) and SIDA dans la Cite (AIDS in the City), as well as in sitcoms.

The film was shot in 1986 in Burkina Faso. It cost $3,000,000 to make, which was raised over seven years by Burkinabé financiers and Hondo's own production company.

== Reception ==
The film won the First Prize (Étalon de Yennenga) at the 1987 Panafrican Film and Television Festival of Ouagadougou (FESPACO). Historian Frank Ukadike called it "a landmark of African cinema, the most ambitious for its inventiveness, professionalism and dedication." Writing for The Boston Phoenix, Chris Fujiwara said that the film avoids clichés, calling it a "large-scale epic drama" that is "both ironic and celebratory". Time Out called it "superbly crafted and expansive".
