= Ai Keita =

Ai Keita is the name of:

- Fuudo, Japanese egame player, real name Keita Ai
- Aï Keïta, Burkinabe actress
