= Algiers-Cape Town Rally =

Series of trans-African north-south road races

The Algiers–Cape Town Rally (or Mediterranean Rally) was an automobile rally competition organised by Les Amis du Sahara et de l'Eurafrique with the assistance of various African Automobile Clubs including the Association sportif de l'automobile club d Algiers, under the post-war control of the Fédération Internationale de l'Automobile, for cars and trucks.

== Prelude (1924) ==
From 1924 Captain Delingette and his wife accompanied by the mechanic Bonnaure (initially driver of the Gradis trans-Saharan raid) crossed the African continent from north to south (Oran – Cape Town, via Nairobi, Elisabethville and Johannesburg), for a "Trip of study and propaganda, alone and without organisation" over 23000 km with a 6-wheel 10HP Renault vehicle.

== Gestation (1930) ==
Brigadier general Octave Meynier designed and organized the first edition of the event, just like twenty years before that of the Mediterranean–Niger Rally (or Trans-Saharan Rally, or Algiers–Gao Rally, known as "tourist") between February and March 1930 on more than 6000 km on the occasion of the centenary of French Algeria, 11 teams each of 4 cars taking the start. The four Cottin & Desgouttes "Sans Secousses" type TA vehicles from 1929 were declared winners.

== 1st edition (1951) ==
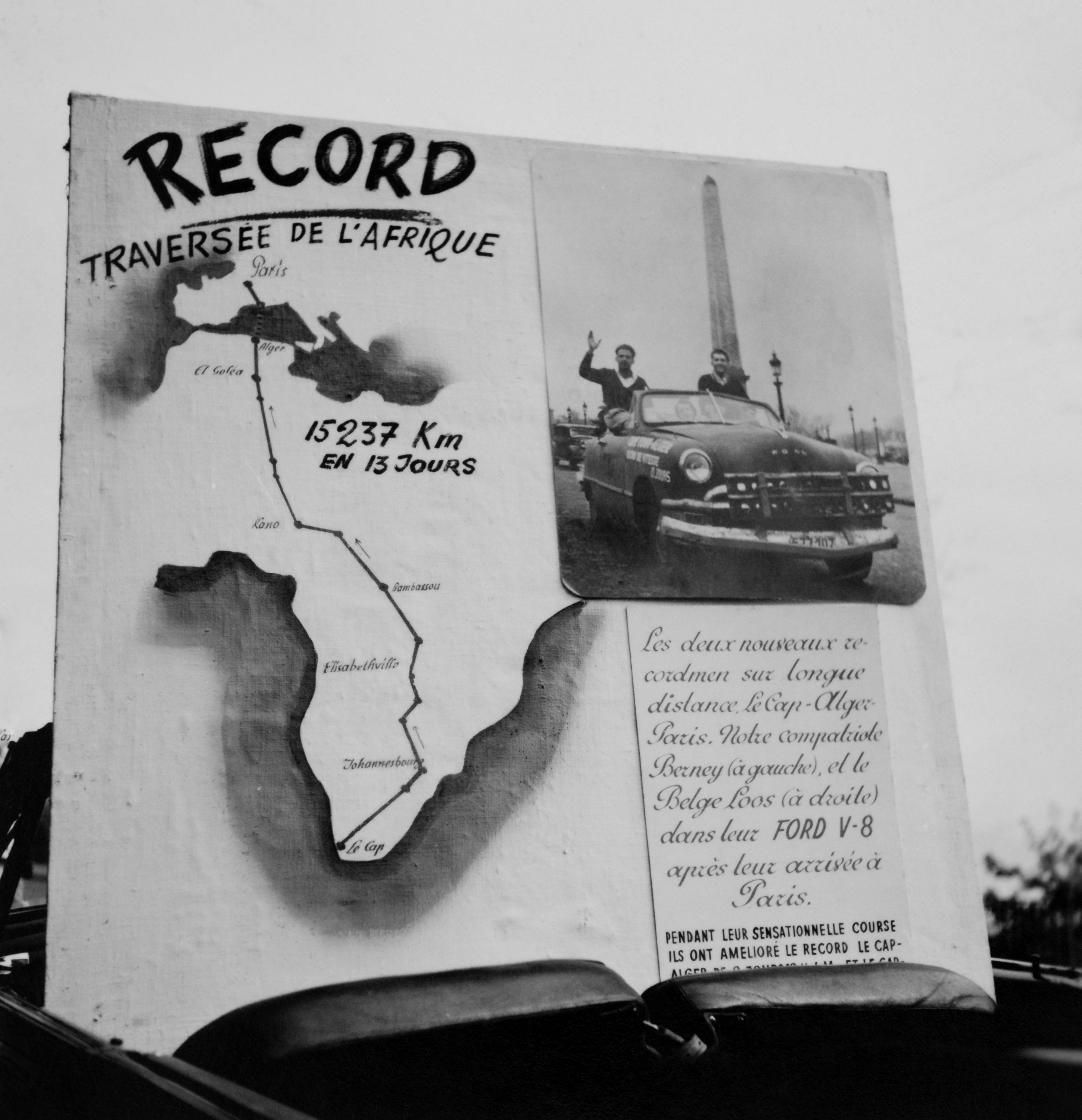
Sign announcing the rally record of Loos and Berney in 1951.

The race took place over 15000 km in 11 stages from 30 December 1950 to 23 January 1951, including just 700 on asphalt roads, with 32 starting vehicles (75 teammates and 7 nations) for 31 finishers. A French military team on a Delahaye pick-up, belonging to the First Category, that of all-terrain vehicles, won the event on one of the six vehicles of this type entered by the brand, divided into two groups. Captain Monnier and Colonel Henri Debrus were part of the victorious crew. For cars, in class >2L. Veglia won over Willys-Jeep, in class 1.1 to 2L. Lapalu on Land Rover was the winner, and in less than 1.1L. Ms. D'Ieteren became the winner, on Volkswagen. During the same period, André Mercier and Charles de Cortanze (class winner at Liège-Rome-Liège in 1950 on 203) covered (independently) a route opposite to that of the event in less than 17 days only, on a Peugeot 203 between 26 December 1950 and 11 January 1951 (15020 km). This record was beaten again by the Belgian Henri Loos and the Swiss Henri Maurice Berney, who rode from Cape Town through Algiers to Paris between 16 March and 29 March 1951 on a Ford V8 (15237 km), in 13 days, 13 hours and 19 minutes.

== 2nd edition (1953) ==
Given the rally's immediate success, the same route was then taken by the competitors for nearly 16000 km in February, over 25 days. A specially prepared Fiat 1900 Kontiki type was declared the winner, led by the Turin factory crew Bruno Martignoni, Gilo Rabezzana and Franco Mazzuccheli. It was triumphantly displayed on the Fiat stand at the 1953 Turin Motor Show.

On 12 March 1953, Captain Jean Heurtaux and Colonel Marceau Crespin were mandated by the French army to bring back a Delahaye type 235 Coach 6 cylinder 3.6L. of 152CV, using the Hoggar route. This car had just finished tenth of the rally with Commander Pottier, Captain de Courcel and Chief Sergeant Houard. This was done in 10 days, 5 hours and 15 minutes, which constituted at the time a new record for the South-North African distance established between Cape Town and Algiers, established over 14300 km. Still independently of the event, from 19 December 1953 to 25 January 1954, Michel Bernier and Jacques Duvey made the journey from Cape Town to Algiers over 17500 km alone aboard a 2CV, before going to classify their vehicle in the Monte-Carlo Rally after a detour through Oslo.

== 3rd edition (1956) ==
It took place from 11 January to 25 February, on the reverse route from Cape Town to Algiers, in 44 days with six cars over a distance of 13500 km. Finished tied 1st for the Italian-Swiss crews, Bruno Martignoni-Schwartz on Fiat 1100 TV and Doctor Haldeman (maternal grandfather of Elon Musk) on Ford "Ranch Wagon " 5.4L (on the second Stanleyville-Algiers section of 6812 km Marinai and Martine won over Peugeot 203 (first Martignoni-Schwartz section from Cape Town to Stanleyville, over 6730 km)).

== 4th edition (1959) ==
After 44 days of racing from 7 January to 20 February, the German Karl Kling associated with co-driver Rainer Günzler won the event in an official Mercedes 190D, the Belgian Olivier Gendebien finishing second with his wife on an ID 19. Peugeot won the Marques' Cup thanks to its 203 (with Henriot and the crews Cochard / Laverny, Paysant / Largo and Gain / Gain), as well as the Ladies' Cup with Henriot, Paysant and Largo, all three wives of members of the male crews aforementioned. The trucks category was won by the crew Bachir Rouighi (owner of a trans-Saharan transport company) / Pellerin on Unic Verdon 6 cylinders of 130HP and 12 tonnes.

== 5th edition (1961) ==
The road to the new Zairian state being now closed, the event was shortened and then became the Algiers-Bangui-Algiers International Rally, or Algiers-Central Africa Rally and return, over 11500 km covered in 18 days in January by 15 cars. The race became essentially "performance", although The African Route (a "tourist" event) was jointly organised over 34 days. Kling and Günzler again became the winners, now on a 220SE model from the Stuttgart firm. Olivier Gendebien this time finished 4th with his compatriot Lucien Bianchi, still on an ID19, while Paul Frère and Jean Vinatier were 3rd. The Ladies' Cup went to Annie Soisbault and her co-pilot Michèle Cancre, on the same model.

== Anecdotes ==
- Some fights occurred between competitors in 1951, with one man even being abandoned in the desert by his own teammate because he was considered undesirable.
- In 1971, automobile designer and record holder Richard Noble and a small team, completed an expedition from London to Cape Town in only 4 months in a 13-year-old Land Rover. Due to customs restrictions in South Africa, a different team brought the Land Rover back to the UK via India, Kashmir and Afghanistan in only 5 months.
- In 1972, the brothers Claude and Bernard Marreau as well as Yvon Garin won a new Trans-African Raid from Cap to Algiers of 15432 km on a Renault 12 Gordini. Their time achieved for the south–north transcontinental crossing is still not equaled to this day.
- In 1992, Gilbert Sabine organized the Paris-Sirte-Cape Town rally raid over 11000 km for the XIV edition of the Dakar Rally. It was won by Hubert Auriol and Philippe Monnet on Mitsubishi Pajero in the car category, by Stéphane Peterhansel in the motorcycle category on Yamaha YZE750T and by Francesco Perlini, Giorgio Albiero and Claudio Vinante in the truck category on Perlini .

== Video library ==
- Saharan Algeria Niger Rally 1930 – Cottin Desgouttes (Berliet Foundation);
- Renault Le Cap, director Serge de Poligny January 1, 1951 ( INA, 45 min 44 s). Serge de Poligny also directed, in 1951, the documentary Algiers – Le Cap .

== Bibliography ==
- From Oran to Cape Town on six wheels by Commander and Madame Delingette, 1927, draeger in-8 square paperback printed in 100 copies based on 11 original woodcuts executed by Jacques Boullaire in 1925 ASIN: B00185DET0;
- Can 5, in a rally across the Sahara, Marthe Oulié, ed. Ernest Flammarion, 1930, 283p. ASIN: B0000DUJ1N (reissue 1935);
- Automotive and tourist action, article For an Algiers-Cape Town rally, 1 September 1949
- Wild road, the Algiers raid Le Cap Algiers, André Mercier, ed. Amiot-Dumont, 1952 (Paris) ASIN: B003WPHL2A;
- L'Automobile n°179, article On the road to Prototypes at the Central African Rally, March 1961;
- Le Saharien n°99, Association La Rahla and Friends of the Sahara, Amicale Sahariens, article by Colonel Nabal (member of the 1950 organizing committee), 4 quarter 1986;
- Cape Town-Algiers: 8 days 22 h. 18 mins. in Renault 12 Gordini, by brothers Bernard and Claude Marreau, ed. Bréa, 1981, 144p.
