= Voulet–Chanoine Mission =

Military expedition in Niger

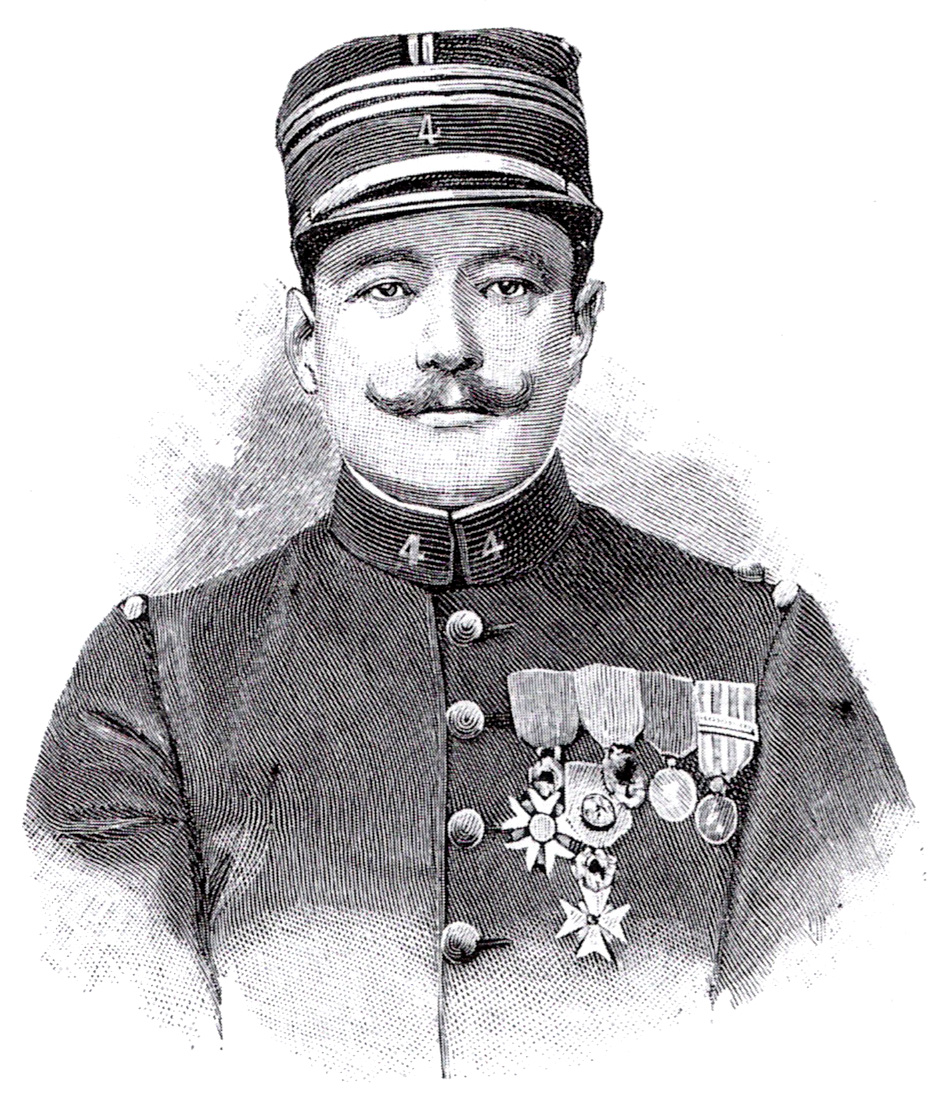
Paul Voulet

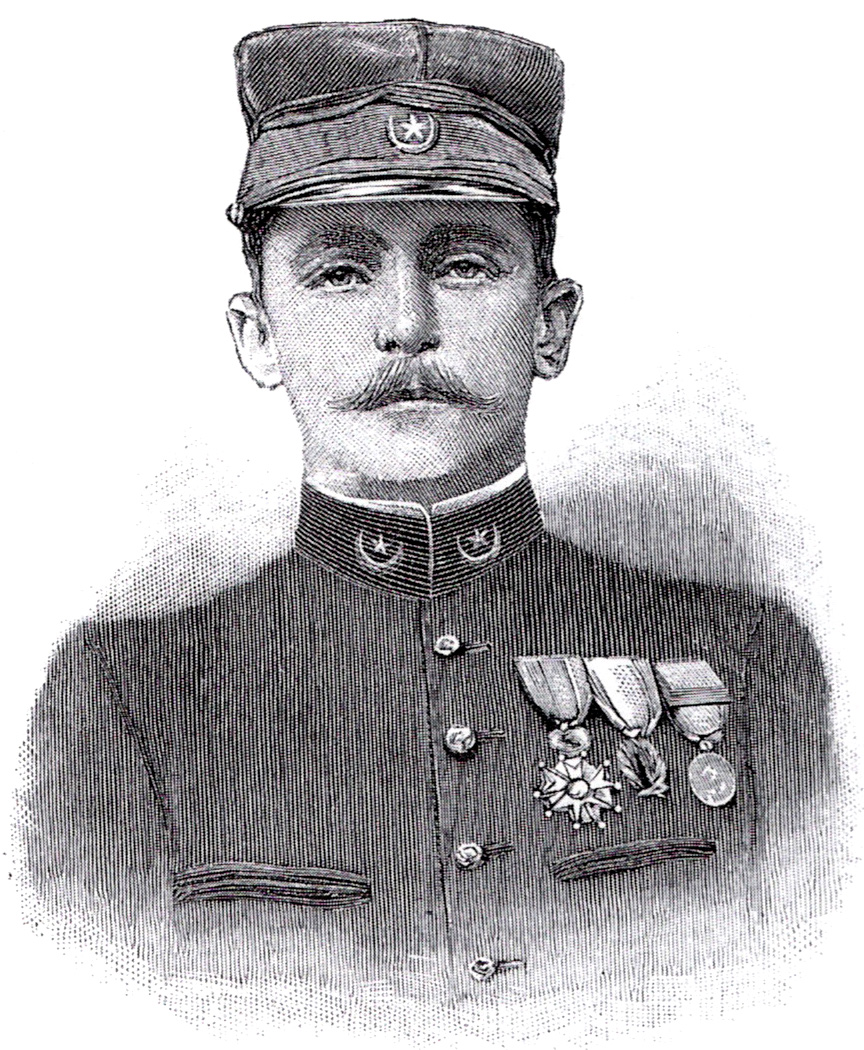
Julien Chanoine

The Voulet–Chanoine Mission, also called Central African-Chad Mission (French: mission Afrique Centrale-Tchad), was a French military expedition sent out from Senegal in 1898 to conquer the Chad Basin and unify all French territories in West Africa. This expedition operated jointly with two other expeditions, the Foureau–Lamy and Gentil missions, which advanced from Algeria and Middle Congo respectively. The refusal of the expedition commander and his second-in-command to follow orders from France, their murder of a commanding officer and their subsequent deaths at the hands of their own soldiers cast a dark shadow over France's emerging colonial empire in Africa at the end of the 19th century. The expedition is remembered for its descent into depravity and extreme violence, actions which today would legally be considered war crimes.

== Structure and directives ==
The Voulet–Chanoine Mission to Lake Chad set out from Dakar in November 1898, moving through French Sudan (modern Mali). It was composed of 50 Senegalese Tirailleurs, 20 spahis (both units recruited in West Africa) and 30 interpreters, but the bulk was formed by 400 auxiliaries and 800 porters that were pressed into service. The force was directed by nine Europeans: the two commanders, the artillery expert lieutenant Paul Joalland, Lt. Louis Peteau, Marine-Lt. Marc Pallier, the medical officer Dr. Henric and three NCOs. The expedition was fully armed with artillery, machine guns, hundreds of rifles and millions of rounds of ammunition.

In command were captain Paul Voulet and his adjutant Lt. Julien Chanoine. The captain, a 32-year-old son of a doctor, was said by his officer colleagues to mix "a true love of blood and cruelty coupled with a sometimes foolish sensitivity"; while the lieutenant, son of the general and future War Minister Charles Chanoine, was judged impulsive, ruthless and "cruel out of cold-bloodedness as well as for pleasure". Both had already proved their ruthlessness and efficiency two years before, when they invaded the Mossi Kingdoms and conquered their capital Ouagadougou.

The mission was the brainchild of Voulet, who saw it as a means to further his career. He actively sought support from French politicians, which was difficult to obtain because conflicts divided and preoccupied the Minister of Colonies André Lebon and the Minister of Foreign Affairs Gabriel Hanotaux. The political crisis of the Dreyfus affair also consumed the attention of French politicians, making it even more difficult for Voulet to be heard. In spite of these obstacles, he successfully obtained approval for his project, with the help of his adjutant Chanoine.

The four months of delay in the start of the mission—and the very limited funds granted—had dire consequences for the future. Voulet completely ignored the local hierarchies and took considerable liberties with the orders he received. This was compounded by the fact that the orders themselves were simultaneously vague and sweeping in scope. Voulet was asked to explore the territory between the Niger River and Lake Chad, and put the area "under French protection". The Minister of the Colonies went so far as to write, "I don't pretend to be able to give you any instructions on which route to choose or how you are to behave towards the native chieftains." In the opinion of the British historian Geoffrey Regan, this meant "giving carte blanche to two known psychopaths in uniform," especially as Voulet had already told the governor of French Sudan that he meant to crush any resistance by burning villages.

== Division and reunion of the column ==
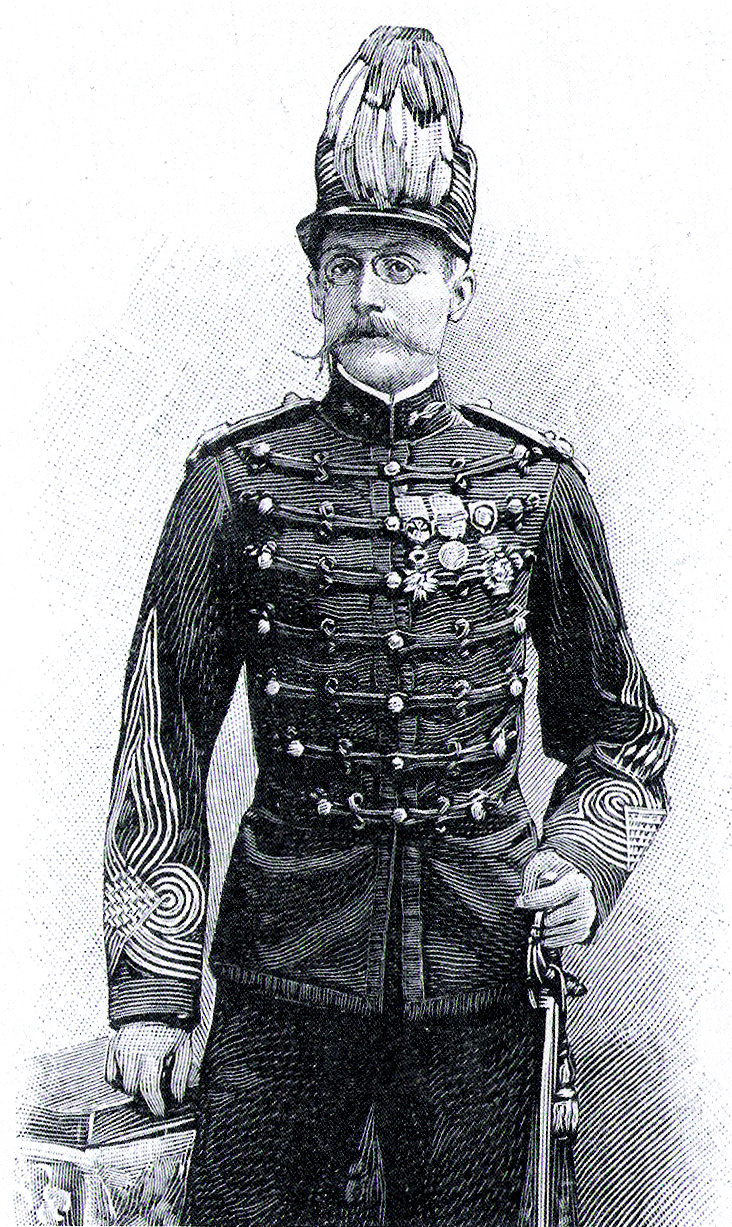
Lieutenant-Colonel Jean-François Klobb

When the column reached Koulikoro, on the Niger, it divided. Chanoine led most of the expedition overland across the 600-mile bend of the river, while Voulet took the rest of the men downriver to Timbuktu, held by Lieutenant-Colonel Jean-François Klobb, who provided him with another 70 tirailleurs and 20 spahis. Chanoine had increasing difficulties finding provisions for his large column in the arid region where he marched; he started pillaging the villages on the way, and gave orders for anyone trying to escape to be shot. In addition to these troubles, a dysentery epidemic broke out. By the end of the first two months the mission had lost 148 bearers to dysentery.

Voulet and Chanoine reunited the expedition in January at Say, the easternmost French post in Sudan (modern Niger). The column was by now 2,000 men strong, well over the number that their supplies could sustain. Even though they were in French-controlled areas, Voulet's troops started pillaging, looting, raping, and killing. Among the most brutal episodes was the sacking of the village of Sansanné-Haoussa on 8 January 1899. One hundred and one people were killed, among them thirty women and children, to set an example in retaliation for the wounding of a couple of his soldiers. When at the end of the month the mission left the Niger River to pass into the semi-desert areas extending east, their march became an endless orgy of looting and killing.

== Scandal in Paris ==
In January, Lt. Peteau, one of the mission's officers, told Voulet that he had had enough and was leaving; Voulet countered by dismissing him on 29 January 1899 for "lack of discipline and enthusiasm". This decision eventually backfired: on 15 February Peteau wrote a letter to his fiancée that fully detailed the atrocities committed by Voulet and Chanoine that he had witnessed. Peteau's fiancée contacted her local deputy, who promptly sent her letter on to the Minister of Colonies Antoine Guillain. This brought about the decision by the Dupuy ministry on 20 April to arrest Voulet and Chanoine and send orders to the Governor-General of French Sudan, Colonel Vimard, to have them replaced at the head of the mission with the governor of Timbuktu, Klobb. Among the chief concerns of the French government was that Voulet was carrying out his depredations in Sokoto, an unconquered territory that by the Anglo-French agreement of June 1898 had been assigned to the United Kingdom.

Klobb immediately left Timbuktu, taking fifty tirailleurs and Lt. Octave Meynier as his second. Meanwhile, Voulet was meeting considerable resistance to his advance from the local queen Sarraounia, and at Lougou on 16 April he encountered his hardest battle yet, with 4 men killed and 6 wounded. Voulet took his revenge on 8 May: in one of the worst massacres in French colonial history, he slaughtered all the inhabitants of the town of Birni-N'Konni, killing possibly thousands of people.

== Voulet's rebellion ==
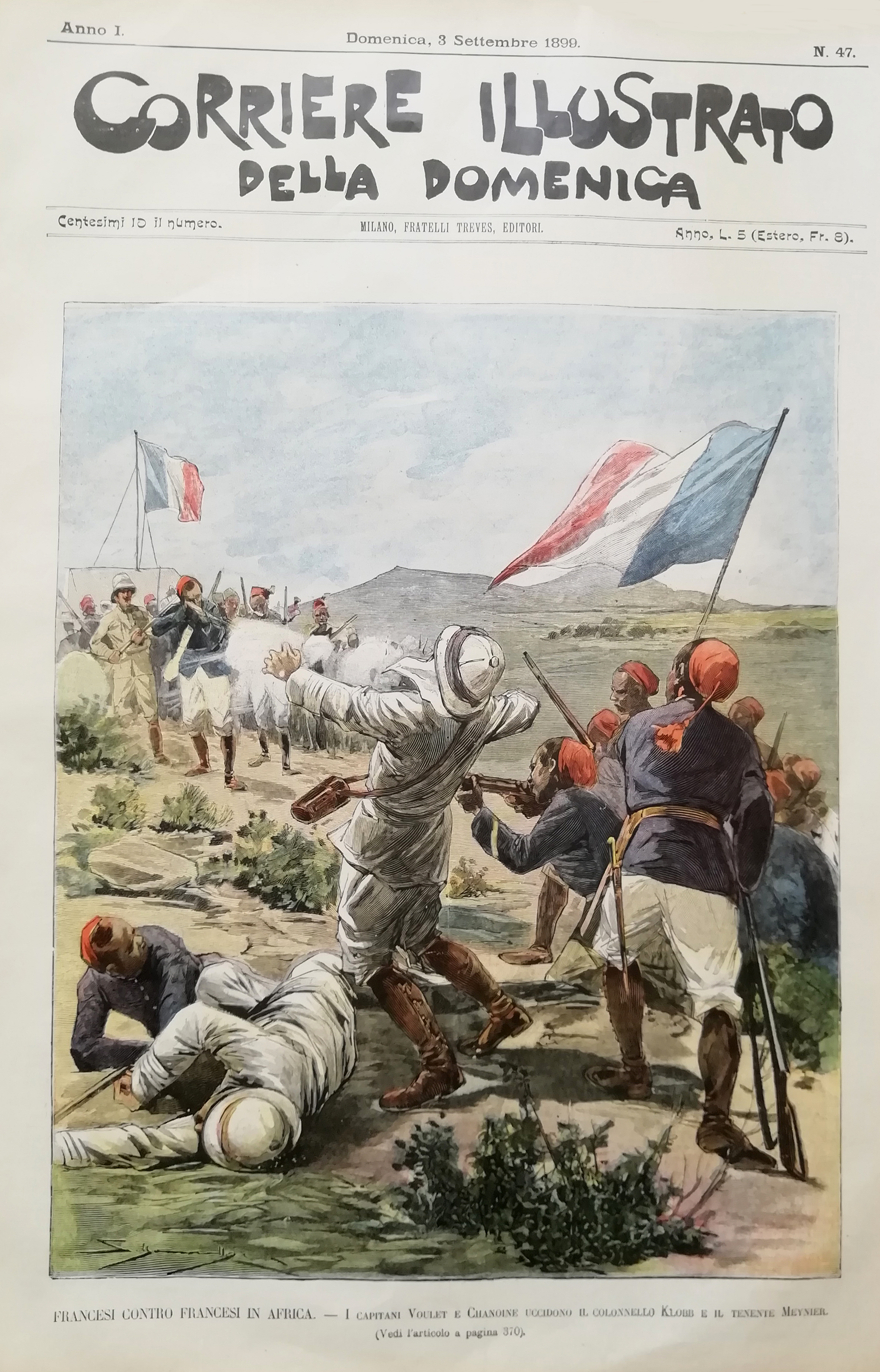
The assassination of lieutenant-colonel Klobb.

Klobb followed the trail left by the "infernal column's" passage; a trail of burned villages and charred corpses. He passed trees where women had been hanged, and cooking fires where children had been roasted. He also found the corpses of the expedition's guides; those that had displeased Voulet had been strung up alive in a position that the foot went to the hyenas and the rest of the body to the vultures.

On 10 July, after a pursuit of over 2000 km, Klobb arrived at Damangara, near Zinder, where the villagers informed him that Voulet and his men were just a few hours' march ahead. He sent an African sergeant with two soldiers to give Voulet a letter informing him that he had been removed from his position and was to return home immediately; to this Voulet replied that he had 600 guns against his (Klobb's) fifty, and would use them if he dared to come near. Voulet and Chanoine were careful not to inform the other officers of Klobb's letter, and in the following days kept them occupied in raids. On July 13 he conducted his last massacre: after a villager killed two of his men, Voulet had 150 women and children slaughtered. The same evening he wrote a second letter to Klobb, in which he again told him not to try to come closer.

Klobb did not believe the other officers or the riflemen would dare to kill, or let be killed, a superior officer. He was unaware that Voulet had kept the new orders secret, and that as a precaution Voulet had made sure only himself and Chanoine would be present to receive him. Consequently, the following morning, Klobb proceeded with his men to Dankori, where Voulet waited. Upon seeing him, Voulet ordered his men to disperse and sent Klobb a last warning, which Klobb ignored.

Klobb, after telling his men not to open fire under any circumstances, in full-dress uniform and with his Légion d'honneur medal pinned on his chest, proceeded alone toward Voulet, who kept telling him to go back. To emphasise his warnings Voulet ordered two salvos fired in the air. When Klobb addressed Voulet's men, reminding them of their duties, Voulet threatened them with a pistol and ordered them to open fire. Klobb fell, wounded, still ordering his men not to return fire; but his words were truncated by a new salvo that killed Klobb, while his soldiers fled.

== Voulet and Chanoine's deaths ==
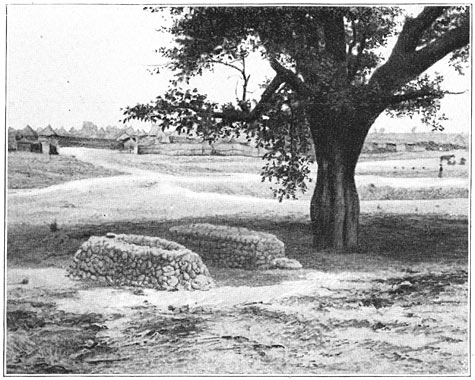
Voulet's and Chanoine's graves near the village of Maijirgui, Niger. Photo taken 1906.

On the evening of Klobb's assassination, Voulet informed his officers of the clash and, while stripping off his galloons, proclaimed: "I'm no longer a Frenchman, I'm a black chief. With you, I will found an empire" (Je ne suis plus Français, je suis un chef noir. Avec vous, je vais fonder un empire). The officers' reaction was far from enthusiastic, and their mood infected the troop. On July 16 an informer told Voulet that the troop was about to mutiny. Voulet and Chanoine assembled the riflemen, and after shooting the informer in front of the troop—for informing him too late of the impending mutiny—Voulet harangued the soldiers about their duty to obey their leaders, while at the same time shooting at them. The Senegalese returned fire, killing Chanoine, but Voulet escaped into the darkness and found refuge with some villagers. A sergeant then informed Lt. Pallier, the first French officer he found, of what had happened, and pledged the loyalty of the troop to him.

The last chapter of Voulet's rebellion was played out the following morning, when he tried to reenter the camp, but was blocked by a sentry who refused to let him pass. Voulet shot at him but missed, and the sentry killed him. Pallier, who was now in command, decided to take Zinder, then the biggest town in present-day Niger and a former vassal of the Bornu Empire; Pallier defeated the local ruler sarki Amadou, and took the city on July 30.

== The mission's completion ==
Shortly afterwards, Pallier left Zinder with 300 riflemen to make a reconnaissance of the route to Lake Chad, but was forced by a mutiny among his men to make a premature return to the city. The soldiers had threatened to kill him if he didn't immediately take them back to Zinder and promise to send them back to French Sudan. Consequently, it was decided at Zinder to split the expedition, with 300 riflemen, Lt. Pallier, Dr. Henric and two French NCOs leaving immediately for French Sudan while the remaining 270 riflemen (who had pledged to continue the mission for another year) put themselves under the command of Lt. Paul Joalland. Klobb's former officer, Lt. Octave Meynier, became Joalland's second and the expedition became known as the Joalland-Meynier Mission.

Joalland and Meynier remained for some time in Zinder to pacify the area; the sarki (king or sultan) Amadou was killed on September 15 during a skirmish, which brought Zinder's territory under full control. This freed the two French officers to leave Zinder on October 3 to continue with their reconnaissance. They took 170 men and a cannon, while 100 men were left behind to secure the city under the command of Sergeant Bouthel, who was awaiting the Foureau-Lamy mission that was heading towards Zinder from Algiers across the Sahara, and which arrived in November.

In January 1900 Foureau and Lamy left Zinder, moving south-east towards the Komadugu Yobe River. They followed this river east to Lake Chad, north around the western and northern shores of the lake and then south along its eastern shore. Here they encountered Joalland who had travelled north, up the east side of the lake, to meet them. The united expeditions, now under the overall command of Lamy, returned south to Joalland's base camp on the right bank of the Chari River, near where it enters Lake Chad from the south.

The joint expedition conquered Kousséri in April 1900; shortly afterwards, on April 21, they were joined by a third expedition, the Gentil Mission, that had entered the area from the Congo and been awaiting them for some time in the region of Lake Chad. The following day, in the battle of Kousséri, this combined force totally defeated Rabih az-Zubayr's forces, and Rabih was killed in the fight, his empire crumbling with him. This event meant that the original expedition had now accomplished all its main aims, that is, surveying the lands of Northern Nigeria and Niger (contributing to a clearer Franco-British delimitation of the colonial borders), uniting with the Foureau-Lamy mission and destroying Rabih's empire, which permitted the institution in September by the French government of the military territory of Chad.

Having achieved their goals, Joalland and Meynier left Chad and returned to French Sudan and the Niger River by November. Joalland, the doctor Henric and the other French officers, due to the military success of the campaign, were able to avoid court-martial. Both Joalland and Meynier went on to have successful careers, and become generals.

== Reactions in France ==
When, in August 1899, the government made public the atrocities committed by the Voulet's expedition and the murder of Klobb, a storm of indignation arose from the press, and France's claim of a "civilizing mission" in Africa was tarnished, as was the army, whose prestige was already considerably weakened by the Dreyfus affair.

The expedition's eventual success greatly reduced the public indignation; and when the Radical MP Paul Vigné d'Octon proposed in the National Assembly on December 7, 1900 the formation of a parliamentary commission of inquiry, the government rejected the request as being "dangerous and purposeless". An enquiry requested by the Ministry of Colonies was closed on December 1, 1902, claiming that Voulet and Chanoine had been driven mad by the dreadful heat, the "soudanite aiguë".

== Legacy ==
=== The mission in literature and cinema ===
After a long period of oblivion, the memory of the expedition was revived in 1976 by the writer Jacques-Francis Rolland in his Le Grand Capitaine, honoured with the Prix des Maisons de la Presse. The book is centered on the figure of Voulet, seen as a titanic individual, reckless and unsubmissive, bloody for reasons of strategy. A very different perspective was taken in 1980 by Abdoulaye Mamani in Sarraounia, the masterpiece of Nigerien fiction. Here the protagonist is not the conqueror, the invader who is openly censured, but the African queen who refuses to submit, and whose heroism is extolled. There is no pretence of impartiality: the author himself was to call his work a roman engagé, i.e. a politically motivated novel.

Mamani was to participate in the 1986 screenplay of Sarraounia, a film based on his novel and directed by the Mauritanian Med Hondo, in a France-Burkina Faso coproduction that won the first prize in the Panafrican Film and Television Festival of Ouagadougou. An anticolonialist epic, the work, like that of Mamani, sets out to offer a radically new African historical perspective, countering the Eurocentric view.

A French television movie produced by Serge Moati in 2004, Capitaines des ténèbres, focuses on the column, and especially on its two captains. The film is openly influenced by Joseph Conrad's 1899 novella Heart of Darkness and in particular by its character Kurtz, of whom Voulet is seen as an incarnation. The material collected for Moati's movie also provides the basis of the documentary Blancs de mémoire, directed by Manuel Gasquet, that follows in the expedition's footsteps and examines its impact on the inhabitants of the areas it passed through.

In 2020, the documentary film African Apocalypse about the horror of Niger's colonial past, in particular focusing on Paul Voulet's horrific behavior, was produced as a non-fiction retelling of Joseph Conrad's Heart of Darkness.

=== Remembrance ===
In his speech at the Eightieth session of the United Nations General Assembly in 2025, the Prime Minister of the Transitional Government of Niger stated:

French: D’abord, un passif colonial non encore soldé : les Nigériens n’ont jamais oublié la violence particulièrement inouïe qui a caractérisé l’occupation coloniale. La tristement célèbre mission Voulet et Chanoine et d’autres expéditions militaires encore se sont distinguées par la mort et la torture à grande échelle qu’elles ont semé à Tera, Djoundjou, Doutchi, Konni, Tessaoua et à Zinder.

English: First, there is an unresolved colonial legacy: Nigeriens have never forgotten the particularly unprecedented violence that characterized the colonial occupation. The infamous Voulet and Chanoine mission and other military expeditions are distinguished by the large-scale death and torture they unleashed in Tera, Djoundjou, Doutchi, Konni, Tessaoua, and Zinder.

— Ali Lamine Zeine

== See also ==
- Battle of Kouno – 1899 battle
- Battle of Togbao – 1899 battle
- Colonialism – Control by distant groups
- French colonial empire – Overseas territories controlled by France (1534–1980)

== Notes ==
=== References ===
- Barrows, Leland (February 2006). "H-Net Reviews". Humanities and Social Sciences Online. Archived from the original on 2016-03-09.
- Carbou, Henri (1912). La région du Tchad et du Ouadai [The region of Chad and Ouadai]. Publications de la Faculté des lettres d'Alger. Bulletin de correspondance africaine,47-48 (in French). Paris: Leroux. hdl:2027/ien.35556011705084. OCLC 812163630 – via HathiTrust.
- Cana, Frank Richardson (1911). "Senegal" . In Chisholm, Hugh (ed.). Encyclopædia Britannica. Vol. 24 (11th ed.). Cambridge University Press. pp. 640–644.
- Caron, Louis (1997). "Review of La mission Afrique Centrale". Comptes rendus d'ouvrages [book reviews]. Méga-Tchad (in French) (1 & 2). Nanterre: CNRS. ISSN 0997-4547. OCLC 475955071. Archived from the original on 2007-09-27. Review of Mathieu 1996
- Gasquet, Manuel; Dozon, Jean-Pierre; M'Bokolo, Elikia; Moati, Serge (2006-03-04). Blancs de mémoire [Memory blanks] (PDF) (Media notes). côté télé (in French). Paris: SCÉRÉN-CNDP. ISBN 978-2-240-01605-8. OCLC 494443186. Archived from the original (PDF) on 2007-07-03.
- Gentil, Émile (1971). La chute de l'empire de Rabah. Hachette.
- Guyotat, Régis (26 September 1999). "La colonne infernale de Voulet-Chanoine". Le Monde (in French). Archived from the original on 13 May 2006.
- Lindqvist, Sven (1997). "Exterminate all the brutes". Translated by Tate, Joan. London: Granta. ISBN 978-1-86207-017-2. OCLC 1034682735 – via Internet Archive.
- Luxemburg, Rosa (August 1939) [1901], "The Socialist Crisis in France (Part 2)" (PDF), The New International, translated by Erber, Ernest, New York: New International Pub. Co., pp. 233–237, OCLC 1425059886 Also at "The Socialist Crisis in France Part II" – via marxists.org..
- Logéat, Yvon (2003). "Version grecque". Atala (3). Archived from the original on 2006-08-28.
- Mathieu, Muriel (1996). La mission Afrique centrale (in French). Paris: L'Harmattan. ISBN 978-2-296-31491-7. OCLC 1227625146.
- Petnkeu, Zacharie Nzepa (2005). Cinema et mythes dans l'espace Francophone: les representations des figures historiques dans les films d'Afrique Noire et des Antilles [Cinema and myths in the French-speaking world: representations of historical figures in films from Black Africa and the Antilles] (PhD thesis) (in French). College Park, Md.: University of Maryland. OCLC 156887644.
- Regan, Geoffrey (2004). "The Central African Mission (1898)". More Military Blunders. London: Carlton. pp. 145–147. ISBN 978-1-84442-710-9. OCLC 1245537770 – via Internet Archive.
- Tidjani Alou, Antoinette (2005). "Sarraounia et ses Intertextes: Identité, Intertextualité et Émergence Littéraire" [Sarraounia and her Intertexts: Identity, Intertextuality and Literary Emergence] (PDF). SudLangues (in French) (5). Dakar, Sénéga: l'Université Cheikh Anta Diop Dakar: 44–69. ISSN 0851-7215. OCLC 939115480. Archived from the original (PDF) on 2007-07-03.
- Zeine, Ali Lamine (2025-09-27). "Speech at the General Debate of the 80th Session of the General Assembly" (PDF). General Debate (in French).
