= Pierre Rouamba =

Burkinabe filmmaker

Pierre Ernest Rouamba
- Born: June 29, 1951; Bobo-Dioulasso, Burkina Faso
- Died: 21 May 2023 (aged 71); Ouagadougou, Burkina Faso
- Occupation(s): Film director, producer, lecturer
- Notable work: Tasuma (2003), Réfugiés mais humains (2007), Le poids du serment (2010)

Pierre Ernest Rouamba (29 June 1951 – 21 May 2023) was a Burkinabe film director and producer. He is especially known for his 2003 film Tasuma.

== Early life and education ==
Pierre Ernest Rouamba was born in Bobo-Dioulasso, Burkina Faso, on 29 June 1951.

He studied at the Institut africain d'Éducation cinématographique (INAFEC) in Ouagadougou.

== Career ==
Rouamba was one of the founders of the film production company ClapAfrik. He served as an assistant director for several feature films, before directing many short films himself, including for television.

== Other activities ==
In 2000 Rouamba was coordinator for the Pan African Federation of Filmmakers (FEPACI), and was on the advisory board of the Panafrican Film and Television Festival of Ouagadougou (FESPACO).

He also taught film direction and production at the Institut Supérieur de l'Image et du Son (ISIS/SE) in Ouagadougou.

== Death ==
Rouamba died in Ouagadougou on 21 May 2023.

== Awards and nominations ==
Film	Festival	Award
Noli (1994)	Montreal Vues d'Afrique 1995; 11èmes Journées du cinéma africain et créole	Prix Jeunesse

== Filmography ==
Rouamba's films include:

Year	Film	Genre	Role	Duration (minutes)
1982	Paweogo, l'émigrant by Kollo Daniel Sanou	Feature	Assistant director	82 m.
1982	Les funérailles du Larlé Naba (The Funeral of Larle Naba)	Short	Co-director with Idrissa Ouédraogo	30 m.
1985	Un enfant quand on veut (A child when you want)	Short	Director	
1992	Wendemi, l'enfant du Bon Dieu (Wendemi, the child of the Good Lord) by Saint Pierre Yaméogo	Drama feature	Assistant director with Hébié Missa	94 m
1994	Noli		Director	
1996; 1997; 1998	Les Fléaux Silencieux (The Silent Plagues); Marcel et le Médiateur (Marcel and the Mediator); La Récupération (Recovery)	Three episodes	Director	
2000	Taxi brousse 08 : contractions (Bush taxi 08: contractions)	Docufiction short	Director	26 m.
2001	Taxi brousse 15 : pharmacie par terre (Bush taxi 15: pharmacy on the ground)	Drama short	Director	26 m.
2002	Taxi brousse 26 : excision (Bush taxi 26: excision)	Comedy short	Director	28 m.
2003	Tasuma by Daniel Sanou Kollo	Comedy feature	Co-producer	90 m.
2007	Réfugiés…. mais humains (Refugees.... but humans)	Drama short	Co-director with Pierre Yaméogo	32 m.
2007	Droit de mémoire (Right of memory)	Historical drama	Co-director with Kollo Daniel Sanou	54 m.
2009	Le Poids du Serment / Nyama (The Weight of the Oath) by Kollo Daniel Sanou	Drama feature	Co-producer	87 m.
