= Octave Meynier =

French military officer

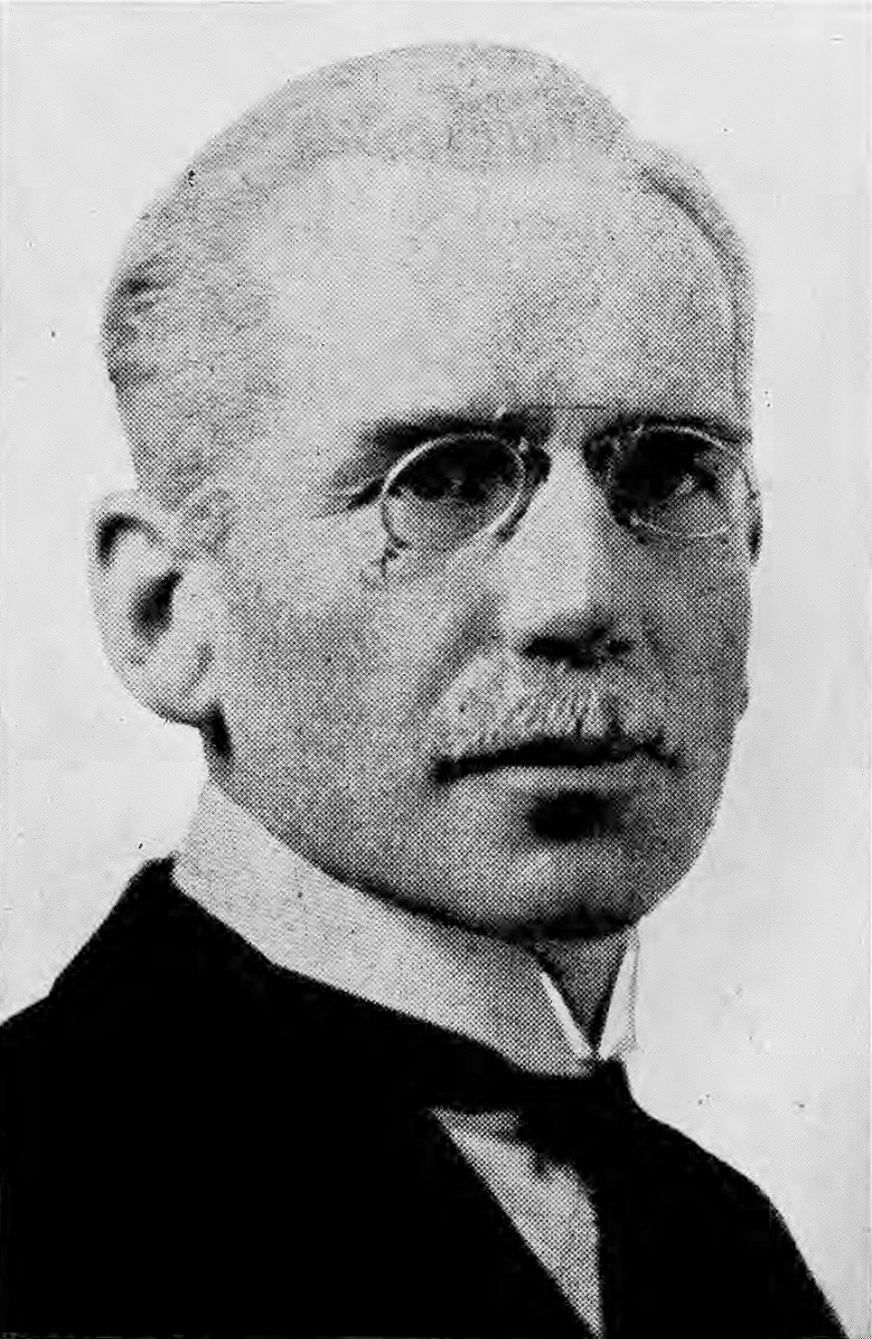
- Born: 22 February 1874; Saint-Yrieix-la-Perche, Haute-Vienne, French Third Republic
- Died: 31 May 1961 (aged 87); Algiers, French Algeria
- Occupation: Military officer

Octave Meynier (22 February 1874 – 31 May 1961) was a French military officer. He is remembered as one of two officers who took control of the Voulet–Chanoine Mission, which mutinied and rampaged through West Africa in 1899. He fought in the First World War and later launched a number of cross-Saharan motorised expeditions.

== Early life and family ==
Octave Meynier's father was the Marine officer François Meynier. Octave's brother Albert was the father of geographer André Meynier.

== French Sudan ==
Meynier graduated from the military academy of Saint-Cyr in 1895, and was immediately assigned to the French Sudan.

Four years later, in 1899, he was Lt-Col. Jean-François Klobb's adjutant in Klobb's mission to reach the Voulet–Chanoine Mission and replace the expedition's commanders, Paul Voulet and Julien Chanoine. Voulet refused to cede command to Klobb, and on 14 July, he killed Klobb and wounded Meynier. Only a few days later, a mutiny among the troops resulted in Voulet's and Chanoine's deaths, and Meynier joined Paul Joalland in command of the expedition. Under Meynier and Joalland, the expedition completed its main goal: the union of French West African possessions. Meynier was later to write of the Voulet affair in A la recherche de Voulet.

In 1913, Meynier was made military commander of the territory of the oasis of Ouargla, and, in 1914, proposed to modernize Africa through the construction of roads.

== World War I ==
During the Battle of Verdun, he assumed command of the 1st Regiment of Algerian Tirailleurs and was wounded on 5 April 1918 by a shell that took away his left arm.

== Algeria ==
After the war, he returned to Africa as head of the military staff of the governor-general of Algeria, Maurice Viollette; from 1926 to 1934 he held the position of Director of the Territories (Saharan Algeria), and was given the opportunity to realize the web of routes covering the Sahara he had first thought of in 1914.

== African auto rallies ==
In 1930 he organised the Mediterranean–Niger car rally, using the roads he had just built.

He left the army in 1935, with the rank of Brigadier General.

Meynier, who saw in rallying an immediate way to improve relations between the Mediterranean and African peoples, organised in 1950 the first Trans-African car rally, the Algiers-Cape Town Rally.
