= Battle of Lougou =

- Part of the Voulet–Chanoine Mission
Date	16 April 1899
Location	Lougou, near Dogondoutchi
Result	French victory

Belligerents
Azna tribe	France

Commanders and leaders
Sarraounia	Paul Voulet

Strength
Unknown, without firearms	near 600 riflemen

Casualties and losses
Unknown	4 dead 6 wounded

The French Voulet–Chanoine Mission, led by the captains Paul Voulet and Julien Chanoine, had been dispatched in 1898 to Africa by the French government with the mission to conquer the territories between the Niger River and Lake Chad and join in uniting French territories in West Africa. After leaving French Sudan in January 1899, they ruthlessly subjugated the native peoples, meeting little resistance.

One of the few to resist was the sorcerer queen Sarraounia, ruler of the Azna, a pagan people in a long Islamized region. Determined to bar the expedition's road, Sarraounia wrote to Voulet a provocative letter full of insults; the French took up the challenge, and on 15 April left the camp, marching towards the villages of Lougou and Tougana, where Sarraounia had concentrated her forces.

The day after, at 6:00, started what Lt. Paul Joalland called "one of the hottest moments of the campaign". The French found the enemy assembled on the field, while women and children had already retired themselves in a small thick and almost impenetrable bush where the Azna defended themselves when facing a superior enemy. After the Azna had started to disperse under the French gunfire, their lines broke when hit by three grapeshot balls; the Azna then retreated in the bush, where the thick foliage partly protected the natives from the gunfire.

The French felt that if left there, the Azna may attack them at night; so it was decided to assault the bush, but being careful to leave a way of escape for the Azna open, so to avoid a too deadly confrontation that could cost too much blood. The French met a strong resistance, killing two riflemen and wounding four, but were at the end successful and forced the Azna to escape.

The battle had protracted itself till 13:00, and among the French tirailleurs four were killed and six wounded, with 7,000 cartridges consumed.
