= Car tailfin =

Aspect of automotive design

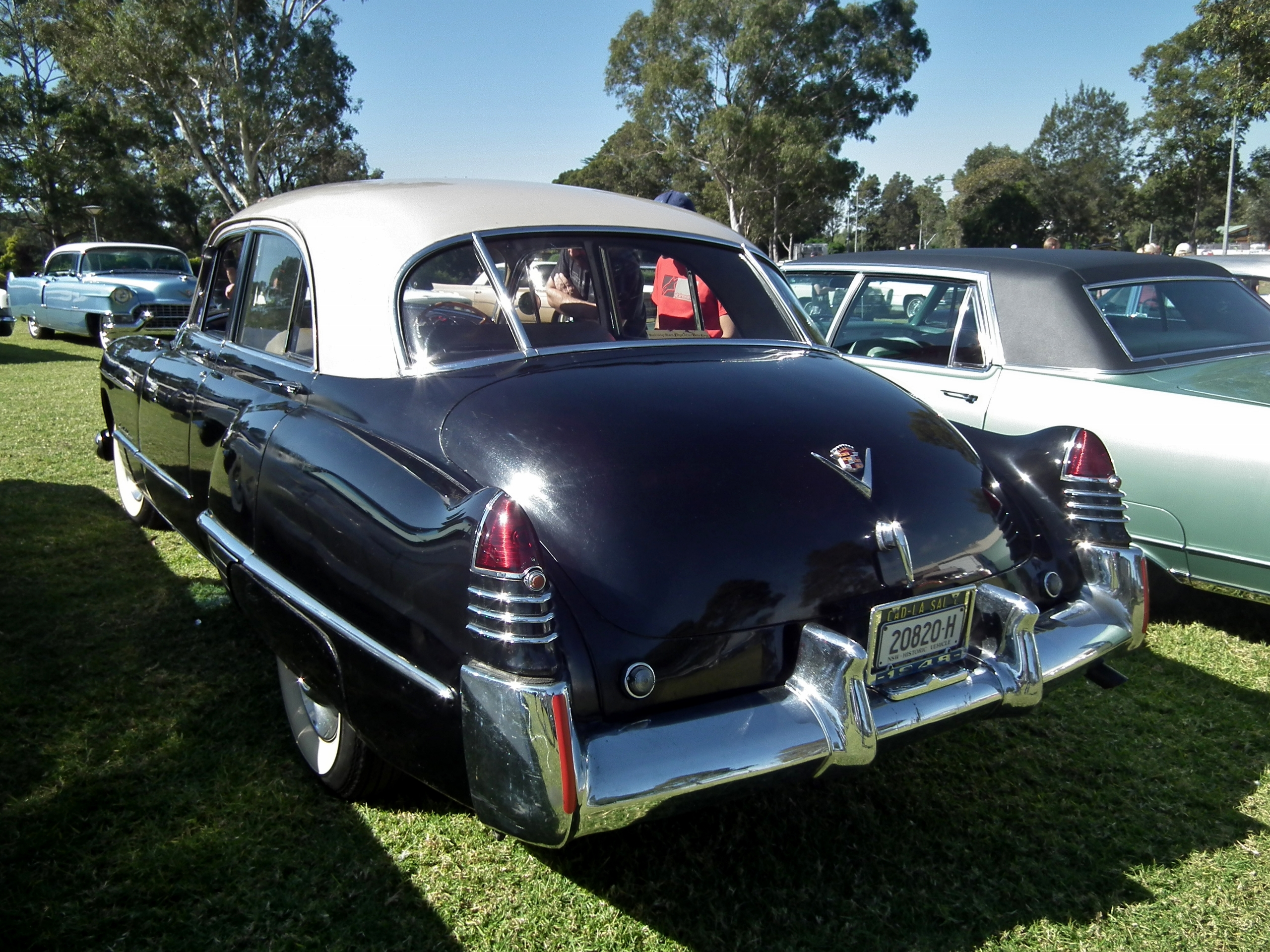
The tailfin was first introduced on the 1948 Cadillac

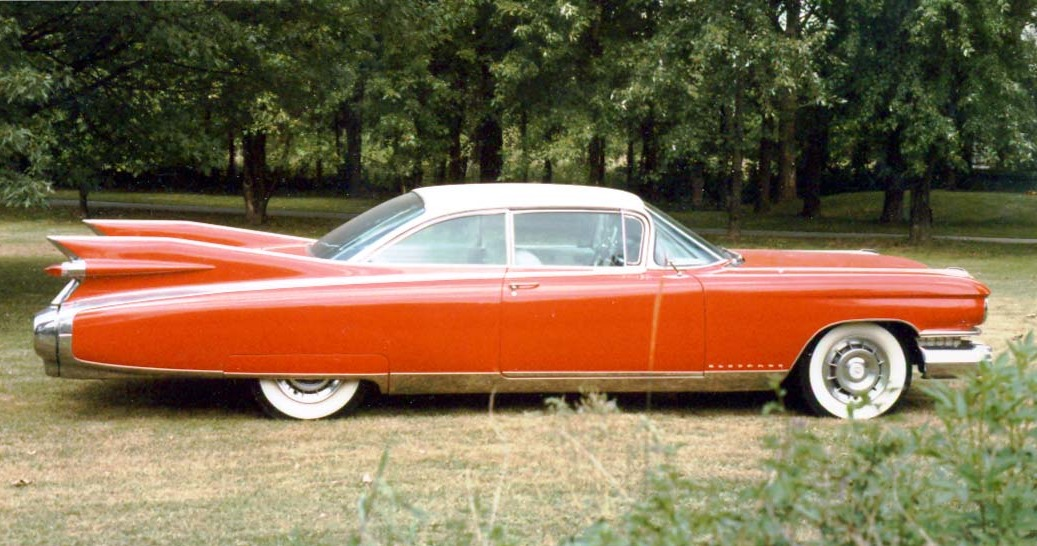
The tailfin at its apex on the 1959 Cadillac Eldorado

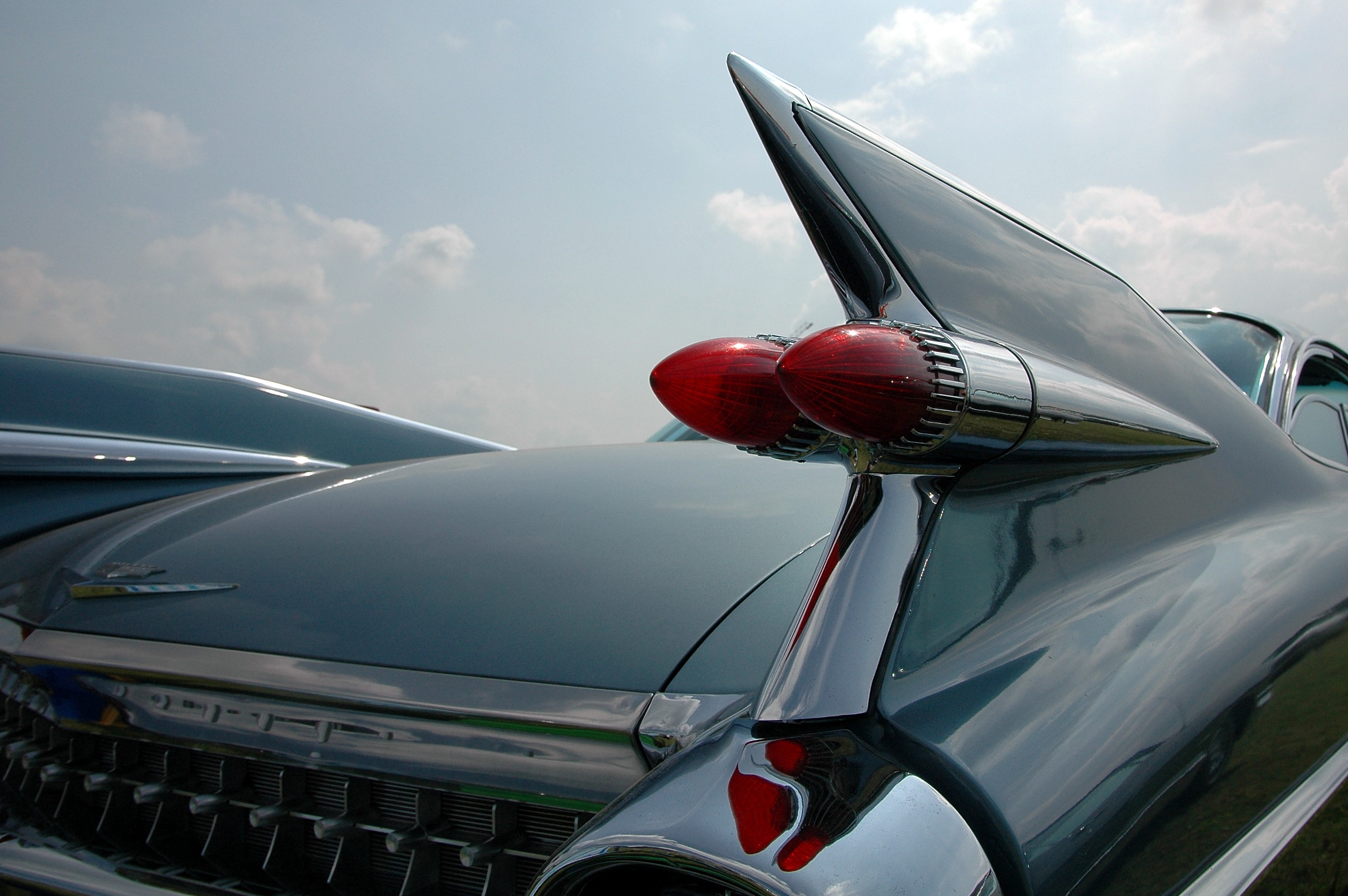
Another view of the 1959 Cadillac tailfin

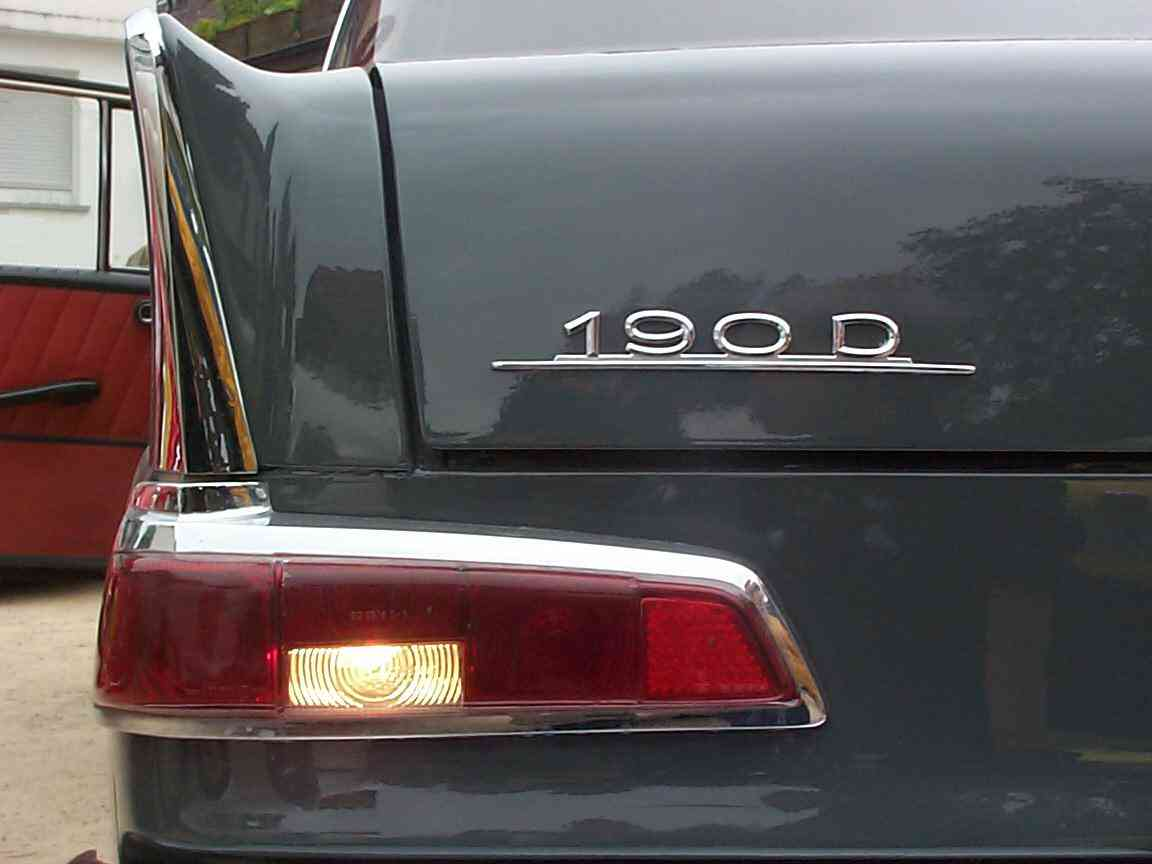
Tailfins (Peilstege) on a Mercedes-Benz W110 sedan

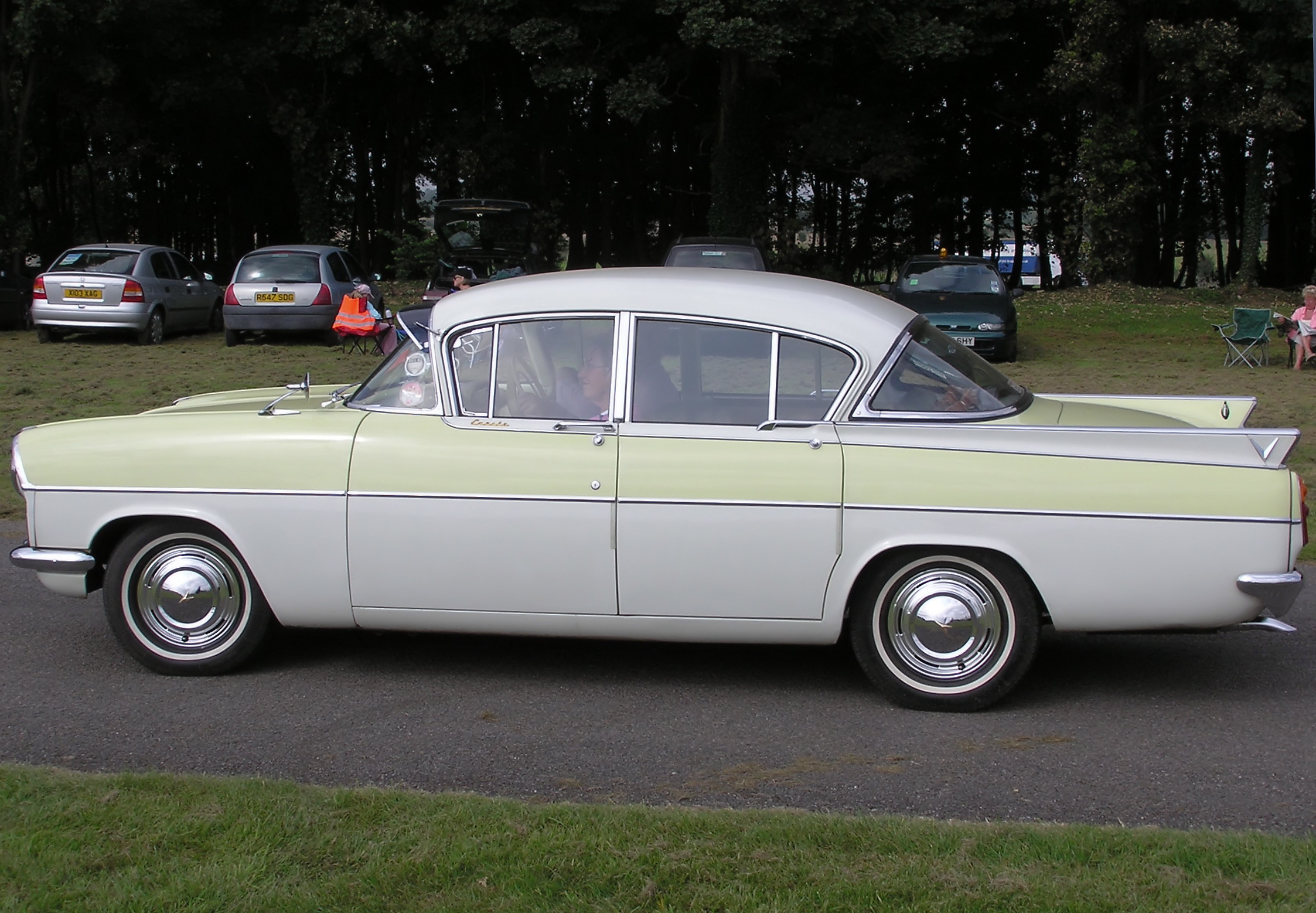
A finned British Vauxhall Cresta PA

The tailfin era of automobile styling encompassed the 1950s and 1960s, peaking between 1955 and 1961. It was a style that spread worldwide, as car designers picked up styling trends from the US automobile industry, where it was regarded as the "golden age" of American auto design and American exceptionalism.

General Motors design chief Harley Earl is often credited for the automobile tailfin, introducing small fins on the 1948 Cadillac, but according to many sources the actual inventor/designer of the tailfin for the 1948 Cadillac was Franklin Quick Hershey, who at the time the 1948 Cadillac was being designed was chief of the GM Special Car Design Studio. It was Hershey who, after seeing an early production model of a P-38 at Selfridge Air Base, thought the twin rudders of the airplane would make a sleek design addition to the rear of future modern automobiles. Tailfins took particular hold on the automotive buying public's imagination as a result of Chrysler designer Virgil Exner’s Forward Look, which subsequently resulted in manufacturers scrambling to install larger and larger tailfins onto new models. As jet-powered aircraft, rockets, and space flight gained public recognition through the Space Race, the automotive tailfin assemblies (including tail lights) were designed to resemble more and more the tailfin and engine sections of contemporary jet fighters and space rockets.

Plymouth claimed that the tailfins were not fins, but "stabilizers" to place the "center of pressure" as far to the rear as possible and thus "reduce by 20% the needs for steering correction in a cross wind", while Mercedes-Benz called its own tailfins Peilstege, sight lines that ostensibly aided in backing up.

== Background ==
Automobile engineer Paul Jaray added a center fin to his prototype designs in the 1920s for aerodynamic stability. Influenced by his patents some car producers made streamlined prototypes with one center positioned tailfin. For example, the Audi F5 Stromliner prototype, Kdf-Wagen prototype, Tatra T77 production car or Fiat Padovan prototype.

Some sub-models of the 1937 Cadillac Fleetwood, which predates the P-38, also contained hints of tailfins via projecting tail-light "paddles", although it is unclear if this influenced later fin designs. The 1941 Cadillac Series 63 4-Door Sedan also had a form of jutting tail-lights, although milder than the 1937 Fleetwood. Even though the 1948 model was the first conscious effort at fins, the earlier partial occurrences may have made the concept more acceptable to consumers and designers. (World War II produced a gap of Cadillac model production between the early 1940s and late 1940s as factories turned to military goods production, interrupting the development of the fin concept.)

== Tailfin era ==
The Cadillac 1948 fin styling proved popular, and its use spread to other models in the General Motors family of brands. Soon it was adopted by other manufacturers, with top Chrysler stylist Virgil Exner in particular taking the tailfin look on board. As confidence grew in the styling trend, the fins grew larger and bolder.

The most extreme tailfins appeared in the late 1950s, such as on the 1959 Cadillac Eldorado and the 1959 Imperial Crown sedan. The 1959 Cadillac fins looked like jet airplane vertical stabilizers with sharp points and twin bullet-shaped taillights. Many of automotive press and much of the public were getting weary of the exaggerated tailfins, and the manufacturers were ready to phase them out because they added cost and complexity to design and manufacturing. Tailfins descended throughout the early 1960s, even adopting a downward slope on the 1965 Cadillacs. Mostly they disappeared and were replaced with a new style of taillight, called lobster-claw taillights, although in instances a sharp-edged quarter panel meeting a downward sloping trunk created the illusion of fins. Vestigial tailfins, however, remained on American cars into the 1990s, at least as far as the 1999 Cadillac Deville.

Mercedes-Benz introduced a modest tailfin on its 1959 W111 series of sedans, which gained the nickname "Fintails". In company terminology, they were Peilstege, sight lines that aid backing up. In 1997, Lancia introduced the Lancia Kappa Coupé with similar rear "sight line" augmentation.

== Safety issues ==
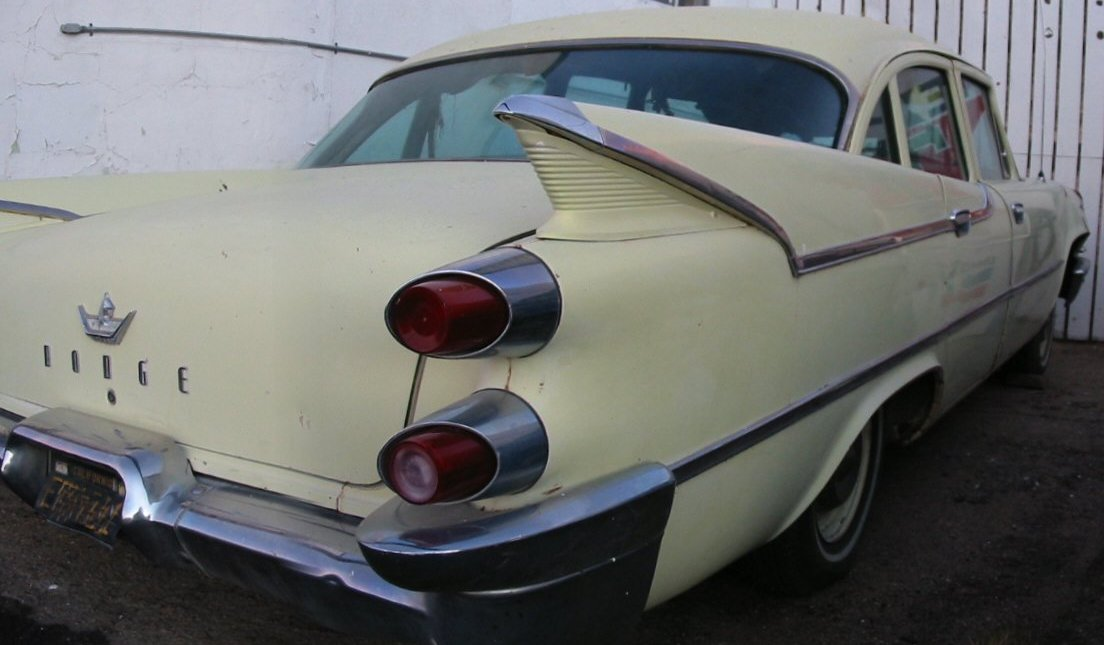
The 1959 Dodge Coronet shows the fin as a separate assembly added to the tail

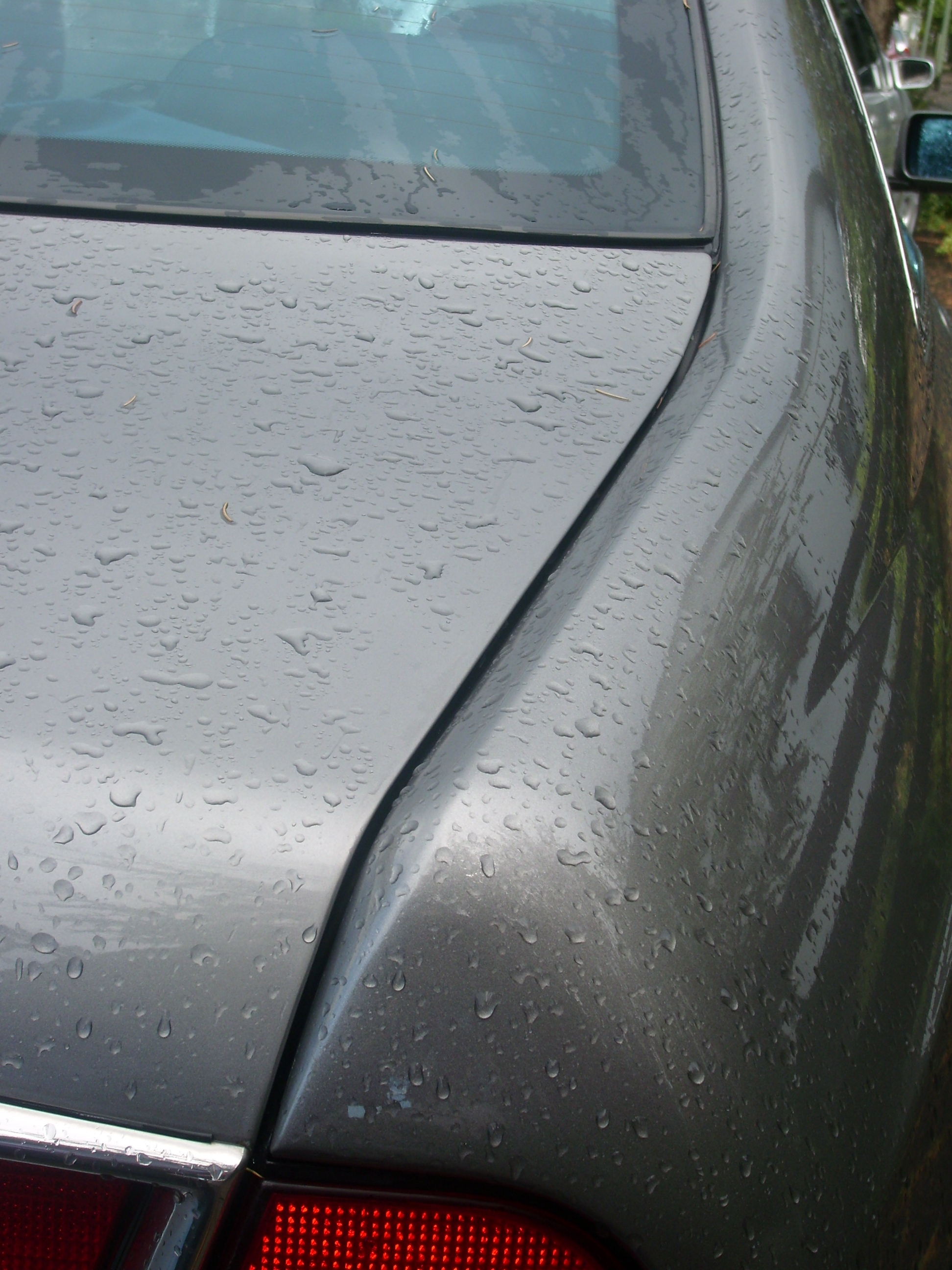
Latent tailfin on the compact Lancia Kappa Coupé

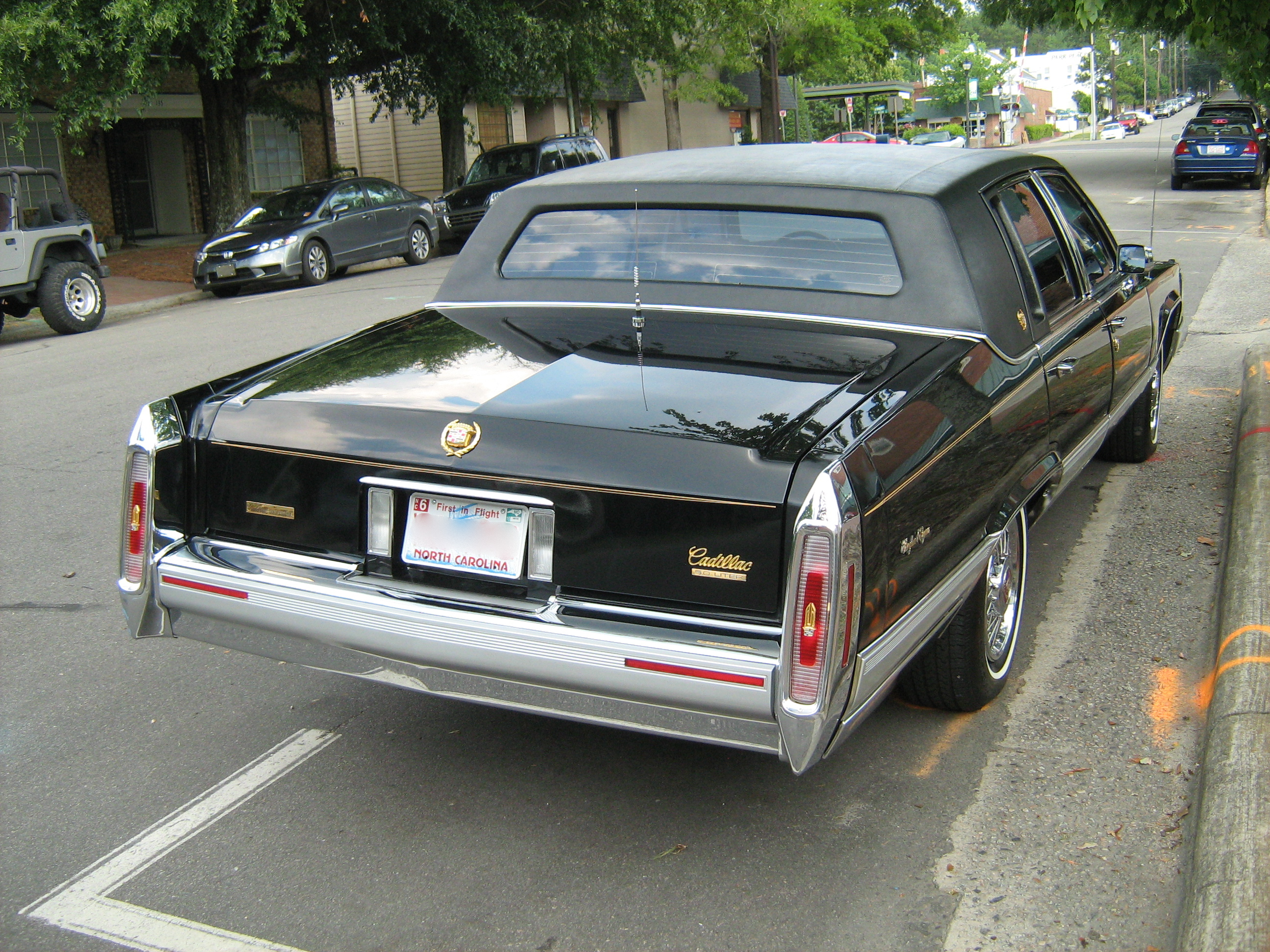
Cadillac tailfins had started to turn downward already by 1965, here seen vestigially a quarter century later on a 1990s Cadillac Brougham d'Elegance

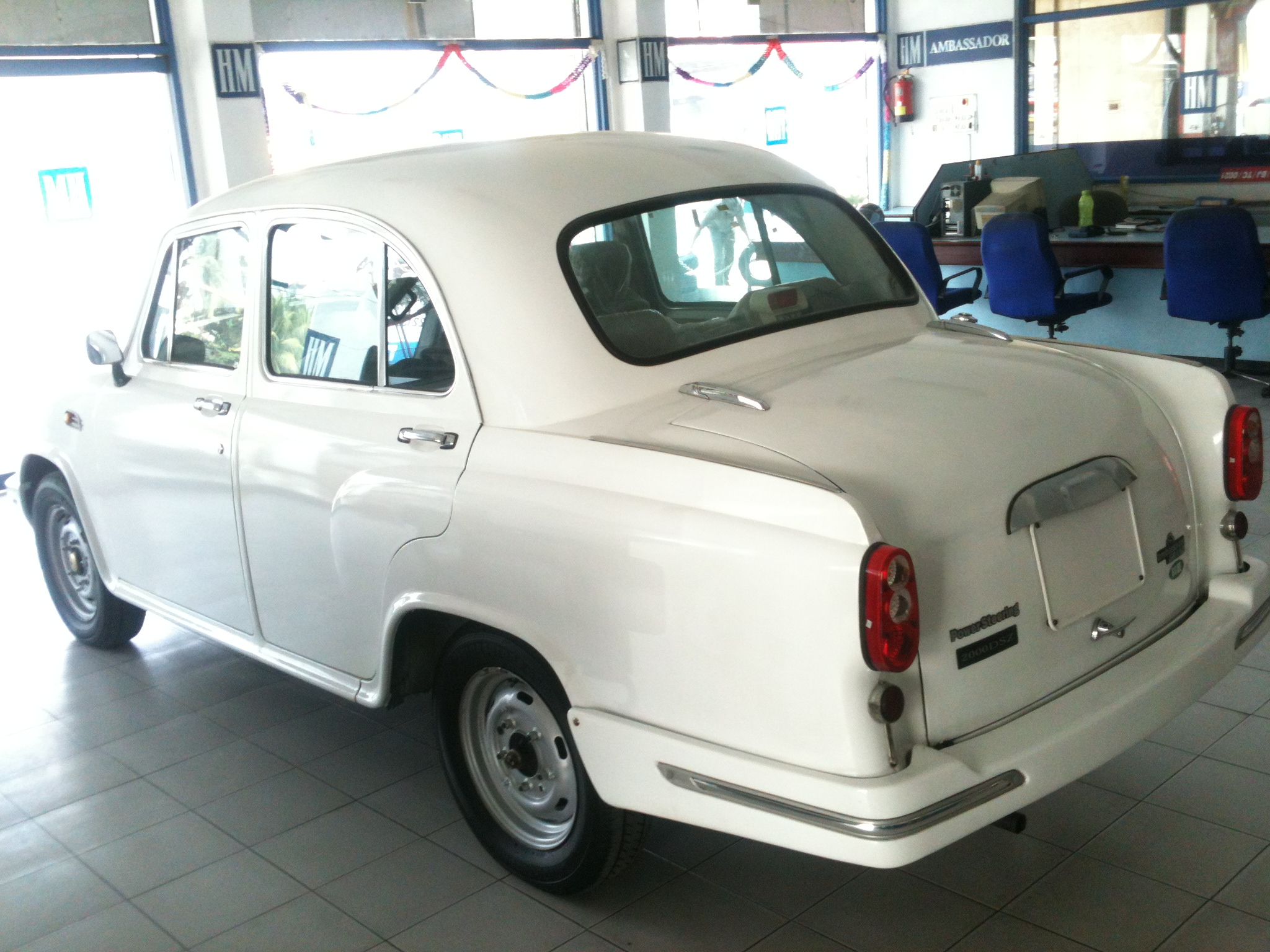
2013 Hindustan Ambassador. Since the Ambassador's exterior design remained virtually unchanged for nearly sixty years, the tailfins were retained for the duration of its production

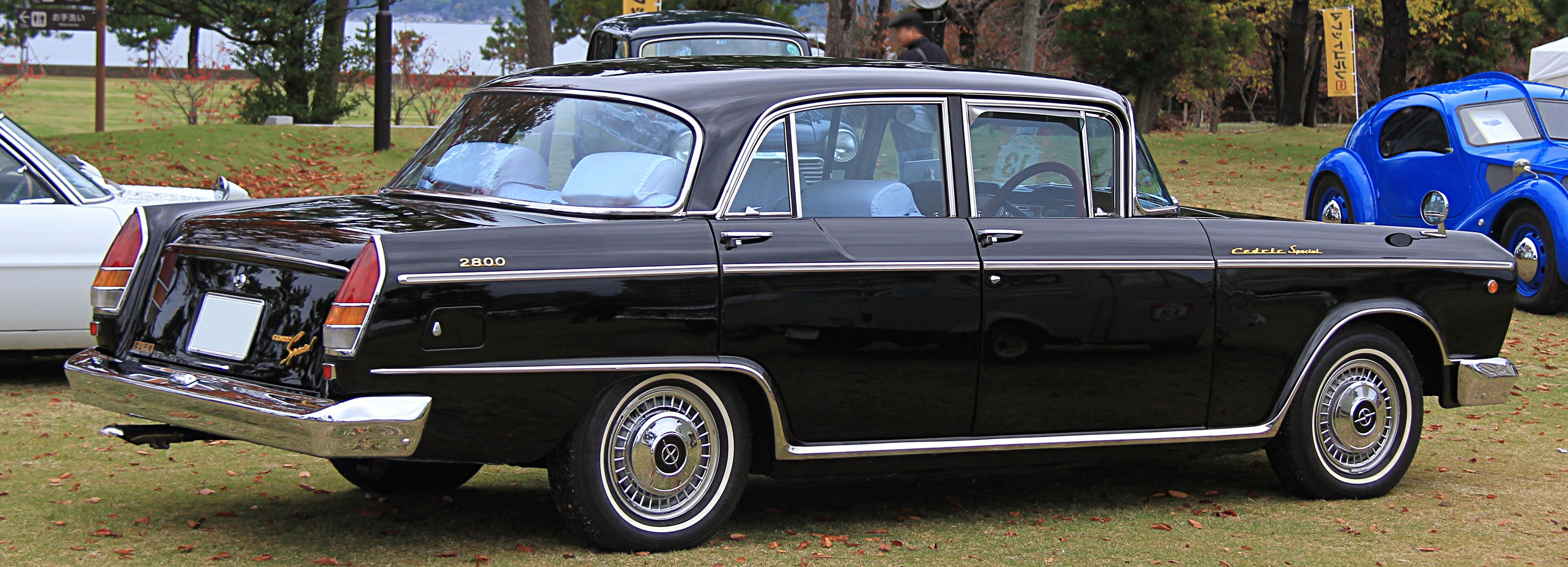
Nissan Cedric Special

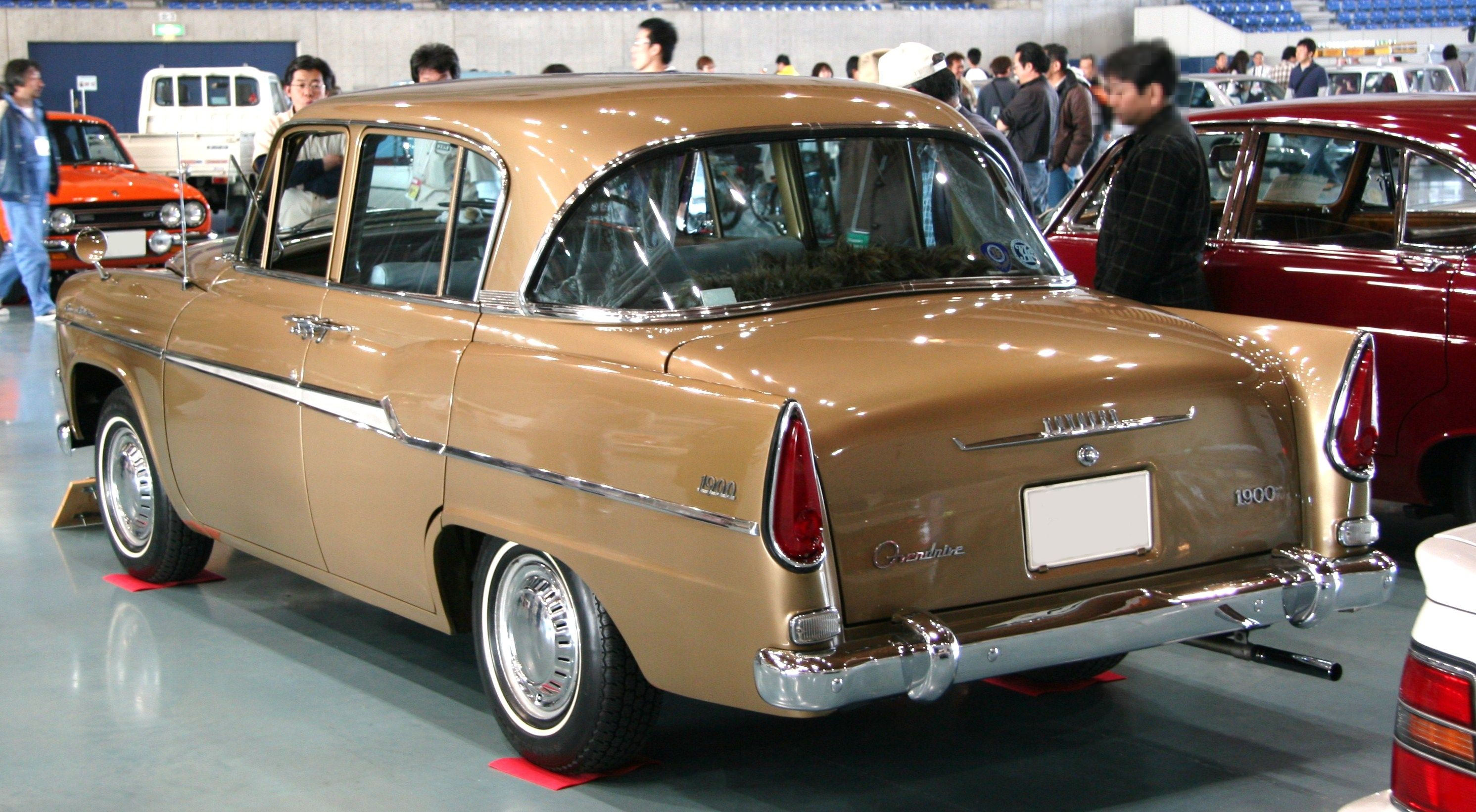
Toyota Crown

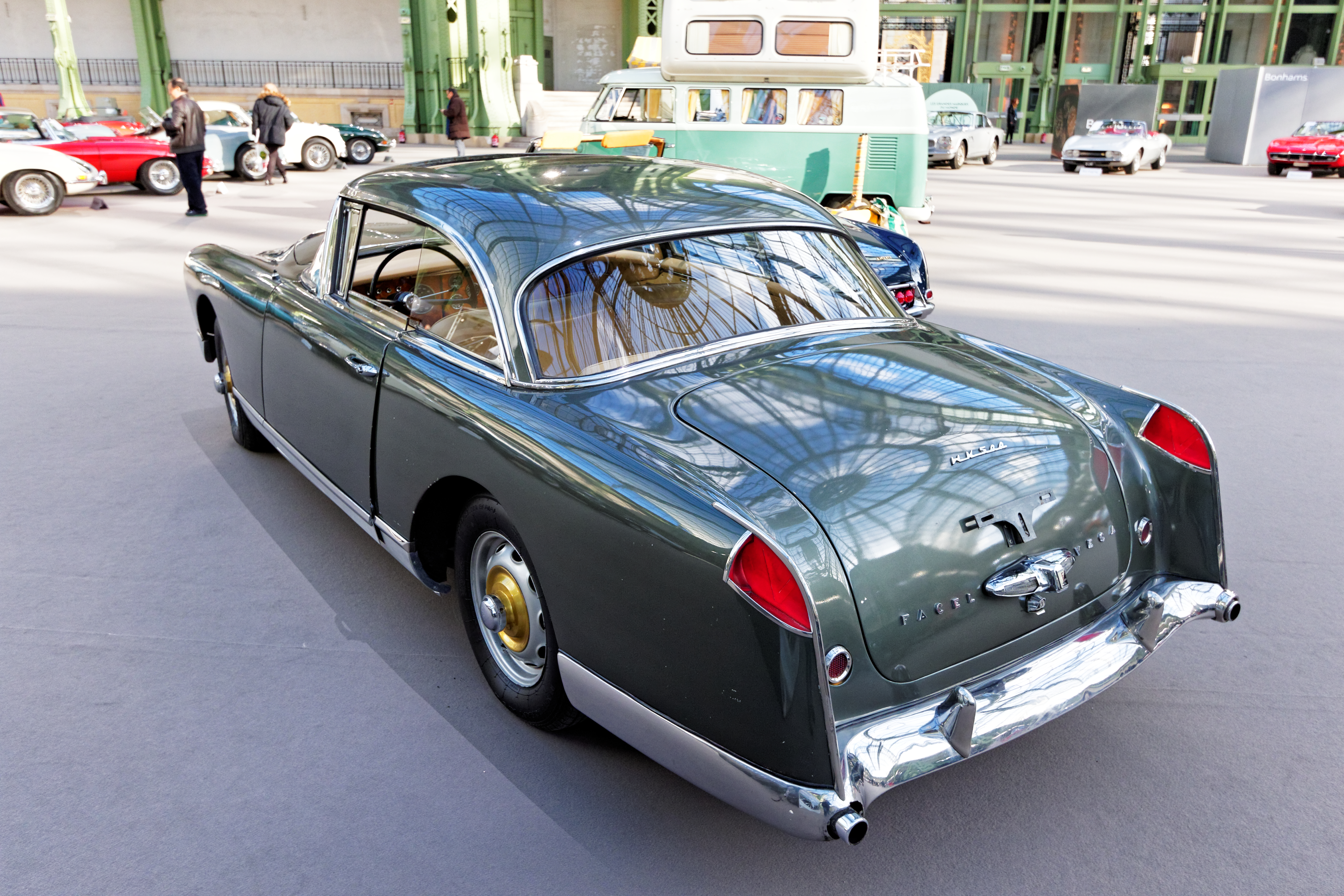
Facel Vega HK 500 coupé

Tailfins have been criticized as a safety concern, even as a parked vehicle. In an analysis of the history of car safety, Lochlann Jain offers a reading of several critical legal cases that, throughout the twentieth century, resulted in the legal "invisibility" of the designed-in dangers of automobiles. Regarding tailfins specifically, Jain analyses, Kahn v. Chrysler (1963), a case addressing a seven-year-old child on a bicycle who collided with a fin and sustained a head injury. A case of the same era, Hatch v. Ford (1958), is also prominent in the study of personal injury from parked vehicles. In both of these cases, children were injured by sharp protrusions on parked cars. The plaintiffs lost in both cases. In Kahn, the court found that Chrysler was not responsible for anticipating "all the possible ways in which a person may injure himself by falling against an automobile." In Hatch, the plaintiff attempted to rely on a law governing the size and protrusion of radiator caps and grills, which the court said did not apply to tailfins.

== Legacy ==
Examples of tailfin styling:

- Auto Union 1000 Sp 1958–1965
- Bentley R Type 1952–1955
- Bentley S1 1955–1959
- Buick LeSabre, 1959–1963
- Buick Roadmaster, 1955–1958
- Buick Electra, 1959–1960
- Cadillac Deville, 1959–1964
- Cadillac Eldorado, 1948–1964
- Chevrolet Bel Air, 1955–1960
- Chevrolet Impala, 1958–1960
- Chrysler New Yorker, 1957–1964
- Chrysler Valiant, 1962
- Chrysler Windsor, 1956–1960
- Cisitalia 1947
- DeSoto Adventurer, 1957–1960
- DeSoto Fireflite, 1956–1960
- Dodge Dart, 1960–1961
- Dodge Lancer, 1955–1959
- Edsel (all models), 1958–1960
- Facel Vega FVS
- Facel Vega Excellence
- Facel Vega Facel II
- Fiat 2100, 1959–1961
- Ford Anglia (105e), 1959–1968
- Ford Consul, 1951–1962
- Ford Fairlane, 1957–1963
- Ford Galaxie, 1959–1961
- Ford Thunderbird, 1957–1963
- Ford Zephyr, 1951–1966
- Holden FB & EK, 1960–1962
- Imperial, 1955–1961
- Lincoln Capri, 1955–1957
- Lincoln Continental, 1957–1960
- Mercedes-Benz Fintail, 1959–1968
- Mercury Comet, 1960–1964
- Mercury Meteor, 1961–1963
- Mercury Monterey, 1957–1964
- Mercury Park Lane, 1959–1960
- Mercury Turnpike Cruiser, 1957–1958
- Morris Major (Series II & Elite,) 1959–1964
- Morris Oxford Farina, 1959–1971
- Moskvitch 402 – Moskvitch 407, 1956–1965
- Moskvitch 408 – Moskvitch 412, 1964–1976
- Nissan Cedric, 1960-1965
- Oldsmobile 98 – Oldsmobile 88, 1957–1959
- Opel Kapitän, 1958–1963
- Packard Caribbean, 1955-1958
- Packard Clipper, 1955-1958
- Packard Patrician, 1953-1958
- Peugeot 404, 1960–1975
- Plymouth Fury, 1956–1960
- Plymouth Belvedere, 1955-1960
- Plymouth Savoy, 1955-1960
- Plymouth Valiant, 1960–1962
- Pontiac Star Chief, 1959–1960
- Pontiac Catalina, 1959–1960
- Rolls-Royce Silver Cloud 1955–1966
- Saab 95, 1959-1978
- Škoda Octavia, 1959–1971
- Studebaker-Packard Hawk series, 1957–1961
- Studebaker President, 1957–1958
- Studebaker Commander, 1958
- Sunbeam Alpine, 1959–1968
- Triumph Herald, 1959-1971
- Toyota Corona, 1960-1964
- Toyota Crown, 1955-1962
- Trabant, 1957-1991
- Vauxhall Cresta PA, 1957–1962
- Volvo P1800
- ZIL-111, 1959–1962

== Subtle reintroduction into car styling ==
In 1999 Cadillac launched the Cadillac Evoq concept to lead the marque's new design language, known as Art and Science. Recent Cadillacs have continued the tradition of the brand's signature vertical taillamp tailfins. Cadillac's designers call the current Cadillacs's styling evocative of tailfins. In 2010, the Cadillac SRX styling incorporated the trademark vertical taillights sculpted into tiny tailfins projecting from the rear. This was also done with the Cadillac XTS, which launched in 2012, and with many other models in later years.

The 2000-2005 Buick LeSabre's rear styling included subtle delta fins as a homage to the early LeSabres.

In 2009 Trabant introduced the Nt concept with distinct tail fins projecting from the rear similar to the earlier models made the Trabant company.

The Chrysler 300 from 2011 to the present has subtle, but noticeable tailfins.

Though not officially mentioned by the manufacturer, reviews from the media compared the sharp angles of the fourth generation Toyota Prius tail-lights similar to tailfins. This is better seen when the tail-lights are lit.

== See also ==
- 1950s American automobile culture
- Googie architecture
- Empennage
- Spoiler, sides of which may resemble tailfins
