= Abdoulaye Mamani =

Poet and novelist (1932–1993)

- Born: 1932; Zinder, Niger
- Died: 1993 (aged 60–61); Niger
- Occupations: Poet and novelist

Abdoulaye Mamani (1932–1993) was a Nigerien poet, novelist and trade unionist.

== Biography ==
Mamani was born in 1932 in Zinder, Niger. He was a trade unionist. In 1980 he published his novel Sarraounia, based on the real-life Battle of Lougou between Azna queen Sarraounia and French Colonial Forces. To write the book, he used written archives as well as oral histories. The novel was adapted into a 1986 film (also called Sarraounia) by director Med Hondo. Mamani died in a car accident in 1993 between Zinder and Niamey.

== Works ==
- 1972: Poémérides
- 1972: Eboniques
- 1972: L'Anthologie de Poésie de Combat
- 1980: Sarraounia
