= Kollo Daniel Sanou =

Burkinabé film director

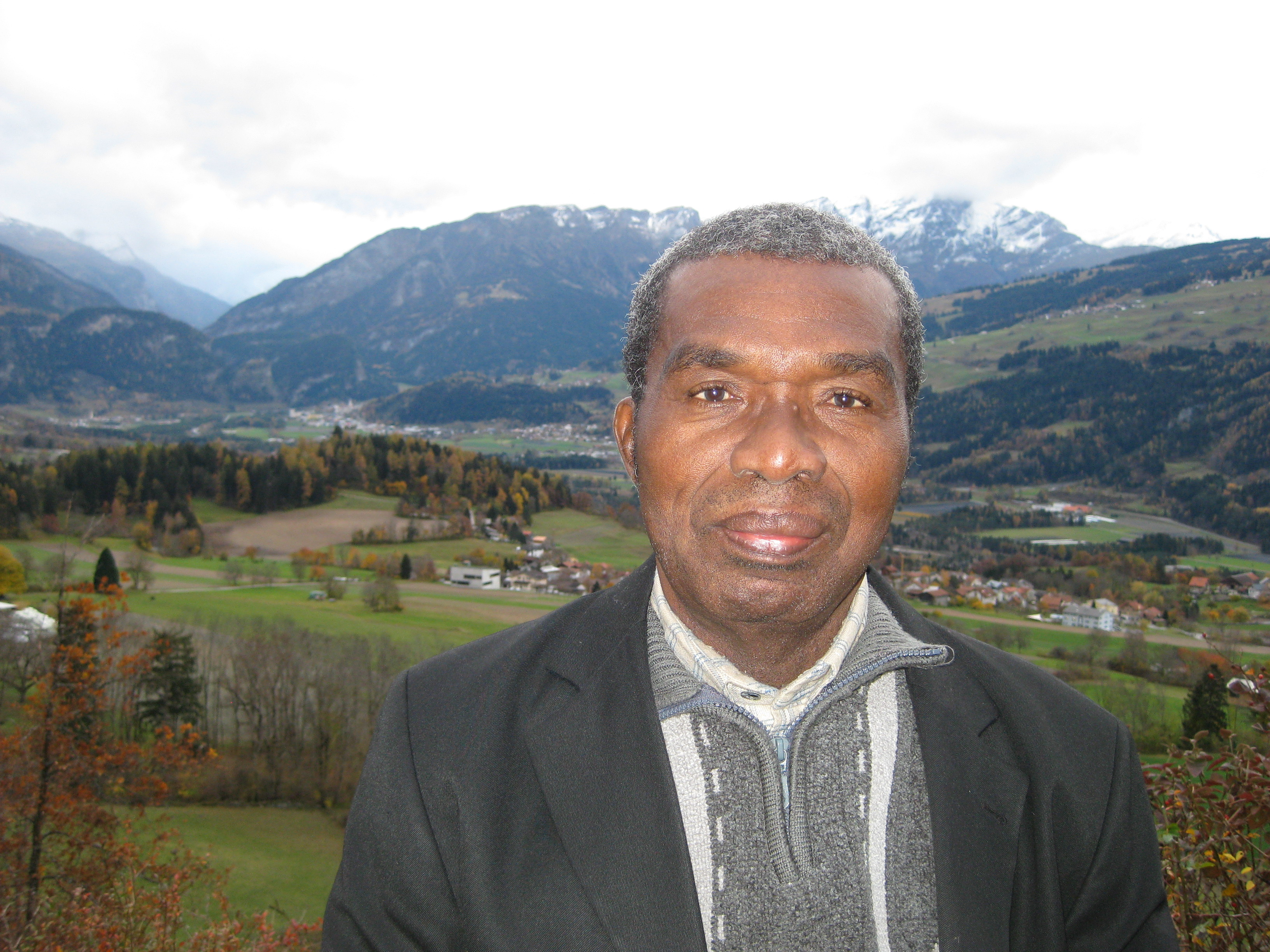
- Born: December 1, 1951 (age 74); Borodougou, Burkina Faso
- Education: Conservatoire libre du cinéma français
- Occupations: fiction and documentary film director and producer
- Notable work: Tasuma

Kollo Daniel Sanou (born 1 December 1951) is a Burkinabé film director as well as a screenwriter and producer of both fiction and documentary films.

== Biography ==
Sanou was born in Borodougou in 1951. He studied at the Institut National des Arts in Abidjan, Ivory Coast for his undergraduate degree and then earned his master's degree at the Conservatoire libre du cinéma français in Paris, France.

== Career ==
Since 1977 Sanou has directed or been the screenwriter of over 25 documentary, fiction, and animated films. He also directed the television series Taxi Brousse, serving as producer as well from 2001 to 2004.

His first film of note was Paweogo (The Immigrant), released in 1982 with production by CINAFRIC, a company set up by local businessman Martial Ouédraogo to produce and distribute local Burkinabé films. However, shortly after the completion of the film, CINAFRIC went bankrupt and had to close due to lack of investment. Paweogo would be the only film the company ever produced. The film was, however, nominated for that year's FESPACO awards, although it did not win.

Sanou served as director and screenwriter for the 2004 film Tasuma, a comedy-drama of a Burkinabé war veteran who had fought for France abroad returning to his home village. The film was well received by critics although Dave Kehr noted that the film fell back on old tropes of African cinema such as a folkloric theme and the setting of the noble village.

== Filmography ==
=== Fictions ===
- 1978 : Beogo Naba (Chief of tomorrow)
- 1982 : Paweogo (The Immigrant)
- 1992 : Jigi (Hope)
- 1998 : Marcel et le médiateur du Faso (co-directed with Pierre Rouamba)
- 2004 : Tasuma
- 2009: Nyama (The Oath)
- 2011 : Le poids du serment
- 2012 : Docteur Yeelzanga
- 2012 - 2016 : Affaires Publiques
- 2018 Tasuma 2

=== Documentaries ===
- 1980 : Les Dodos
- 1984 : L'Artisanat et son pays
- 1984 : Jubilé d'une cathédrale
- 1987 : Sarraouina
- 1989 : Fespaco 1989
- 1987 : L'artisanat et son pays
- 1991 : Siao 1991
- 2000 : La Piraterie, un fléau en Afrique de l'Ouest
- 2006 : Droit de mémoire (co-directed with Pierre Rouamba)
- 2007 : Après l'urgence (co-directed with Jean-Claude Frisque)
- 2013 : Le Bon Riz de Madame Moui (produced with a grant from Taiwan)

=== Animation ===
- 1984 : L'Aigle et le Caméléon

=== Television ===
- 1999 - 2004 : Taxi Brousse
