= Sarraounia =

Traditional ruler of Lougou, Niger

Sarraounia Mangou
- Occupations: Chief, Priestess
- Known for: Resistance against the Voulet–Chanoine Mission
- Title: Sarraounia (Queen) of Lougou

Sarraounia Mangou was a chief/priestess of the animist Azna subgroup of the Hausa, who fought French colonial troops of the Voulet–Chanoine Mission at the Battle of Lougou (in present-day Niger) in 1899.

== Biography ==
Sarraounia means queen or female chief in the Hausa language. To the predominantly animist Azna people of Lougou and surrounding Hausa towns and villages, the term refers to a lineage of female rulers who exercised both political and religious power.

Sarraounia Mangou was the most famous of the Sarraounias, due to her resistance against French colonial troops at the Battle of Lougou in 1899. While most chiefs in Niger pragmatically submitted to French power, Sarraounia Mangou mobilized her people and resources to confront the French forces of the Voulet–Chanoine Mission, which launched a fierce attack on her fortress capital of Lougou.

Overwhelmed by the superior firepower of the French, she and her fighters retreated from the fortress, and engaged the attackers in a protracted guerrilla battle which eventually forced the French to abandon their project of subduing her.

According to native oral history, she was a witch with pure yellow eyes who could hurl fire at the invaders and even summon fog to help them get away from the French army. It is said her magical charms erased her troops footsteps from the battlefield and any crops that were blazed to ash regrew overnight with more than enough food to keep the warriors going.

Sarraounia held off the column for much of the early months of 1899, but Lougou was finally stormed in April 1899 and Sarraounia disappeared.

== In fiction ==
She is the subject of the 1986 film Sarraounia based on the novel Sarraounia, le drame de la reine magicienne, by Nigerien writer Abdoulaye Mamani.
