= Jean-François Klobb =

French colonial officer (1857–1899)

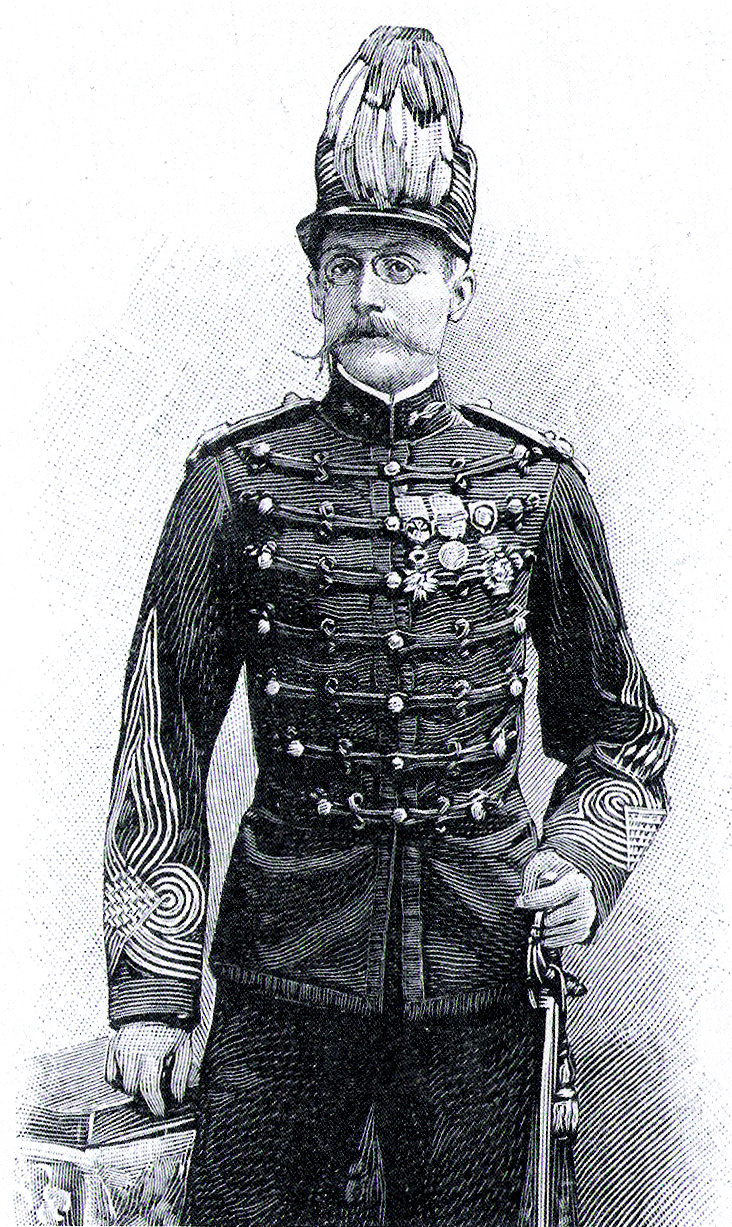

Jean-François Arsène Klobb (29 June 1857 – 14 July 1899) was a French colonial officer. He was assassinated by order of Captain Paul Voulet.

== Background and early career ==
Born on June 29, 1857, in Ribeauvillé in the department of Haut-Rhin in Alsace, he was sent as an officer to French Sudan (today Mali). He participated to the long war against the local ruler Samory Touré, and was in 1892 the chief of staff of Colonel Louis Archinard, governor of French Sudan.

He returned to French Sudan with the rank of major in July 1895. He distinguished himself against the Tuaregs, whom he defeated in a series of battles fought in 1897–98. This helped to secure French control on Timbuktu, which was endangered by the massacre near the city of a platoon of Sipahis in June 1897.

== Voulet–Chanoine Mission ==
Promoted to lieutenant colonel, he was made chief administrator of Timbuktu. He held this position when he met there in 1898 Captain Paul Voulet, commander of the Voulet–Chanoine Mission marching to Lake Chad, whom he provided with 70 Senegalese Tirailleurs and 20 spahi cavalry (both colonial troops recruited in West Africa). When in April 1899, he knew of the atrocities committed by the expedition, orders were given to Klobb to assemble a small mission, reach Voulet's column and assume command of the expedition.

Klobb followed the trail left by the "infernal columns" passage: a trail of burned villages and charred corpses. He passed trees where women had been hanged, and cooking fires where children had been roasted. He also found the corpses of the expedition's guides—those that had displeased Voulet had been strung up alive in a position where the foot was taken by hyenas and the rest of the body by vultures.

On July 10, after a pursuit of over 2000 kilometers, Klobb arrived at Damangara, near Zinder, where the villagers informed him that Voulet and his men were just a few hours' march ahead. He sent an African sergeant with two soldiers to give Voulet a letter in which he informed him that he had been removed from his position and was to return home immediately. Voulet replied that he had 600 guns against his fifty, and would use them if Klobb dared to come near.

=== Death ===
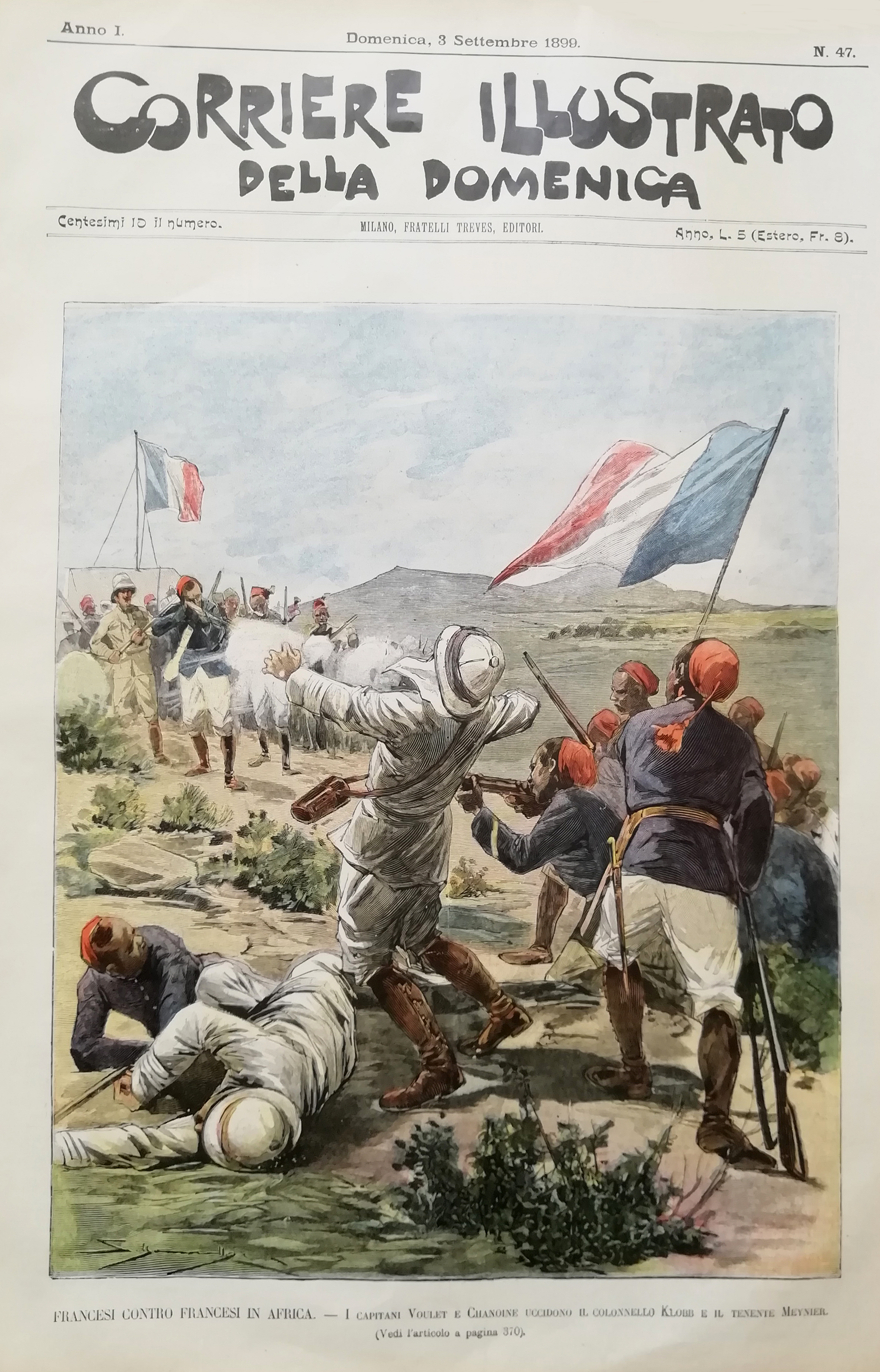
The murder of lieutenant-colonel Klobb

Klobb did not believe the other officers or the riflemen would dare to kill, or let be killed, a superior officer. He did not know that Voulet and Chanoine had kept the orders from Paris secret, and that they had made sure that the other officers were not present. Consequently, on July 14 Klobb proceeded with his men to Dankori, where Voulet waited. Klobb, after telling his men not to open fire under any circumstances, in full dress uniform and with his Légion d'honneur pinned on his chest, proceeded alone toward Voulet, who kept telling him to go back. To emphasise his warnings Voulet ordered two salvos fired in the air. When Klobb addressed Voulet's men, reminding them of their duties, Voulet threatened them with a pistol and ordered them to open fire. Klobb fell, wounded, still ordering Meynier not to return fire—but his words were truncated by a new salvo that killed Klobb and wounded his second, Octave Meynier, while Klobb's soldiers fled. Klobb is buried in Timbuktu .
