= The Three Lascars =

- French: Les Trois Lascars
- Directed by: Boubacar Diallo
- Written by: Boubacar Diallo, Axel Guyot
- Produced by: Philippe Braunstein, Boubakar Diallo, Axel Guyot, Luis Marquès
- Starring: Issaka Savadogo, Mahoula Kane, Dieudonne Yoda
- Production company: Les Films d'Avalon (France)
- Release date: October 2021 (FESPACO)
- Running time: 100 minutes
- Country: Burkina Faso
- Language: French

The Three Lascars (French: Les Trois Lascars) is a 2021 Burkinabé comedy film directed by Boubacar Diallo. The film became the most successful cinema release from francophone Africa in the 21st century. It was the only Burkinabé film screened at the 2021 FESPACO.

== Synopsis ==
Under pressure from their respective mistresses, three friends (Idriss, Momo and Willy) organize an extramarital trip to an extravagant hotel outside of their home base of Ouagadougou. A seminar in Abidjan is the perfect alibi for the trio to free themselves from their wives for a weekend. As soon as they arrive, their euphoria turns to dread when they learn that the plane they were supposed to have taken crashed. Ridden with guilt and abandoned by their mistresses, the three adulterers now have to confront their angry wives, hungry for revenge after the deception.

== Cast ==
- Issaka Savadogo
- Mahoula Kane
- Dieudonné Yoda
- Zena Alisar Khalil
- Eva Guehi
- Irène Minoungou
- Kadhy Touré
- Mouna N’Diaye
- Mariam Aida Niatta
