= Paul Joalland =

Military officer of the 3rd French Republic

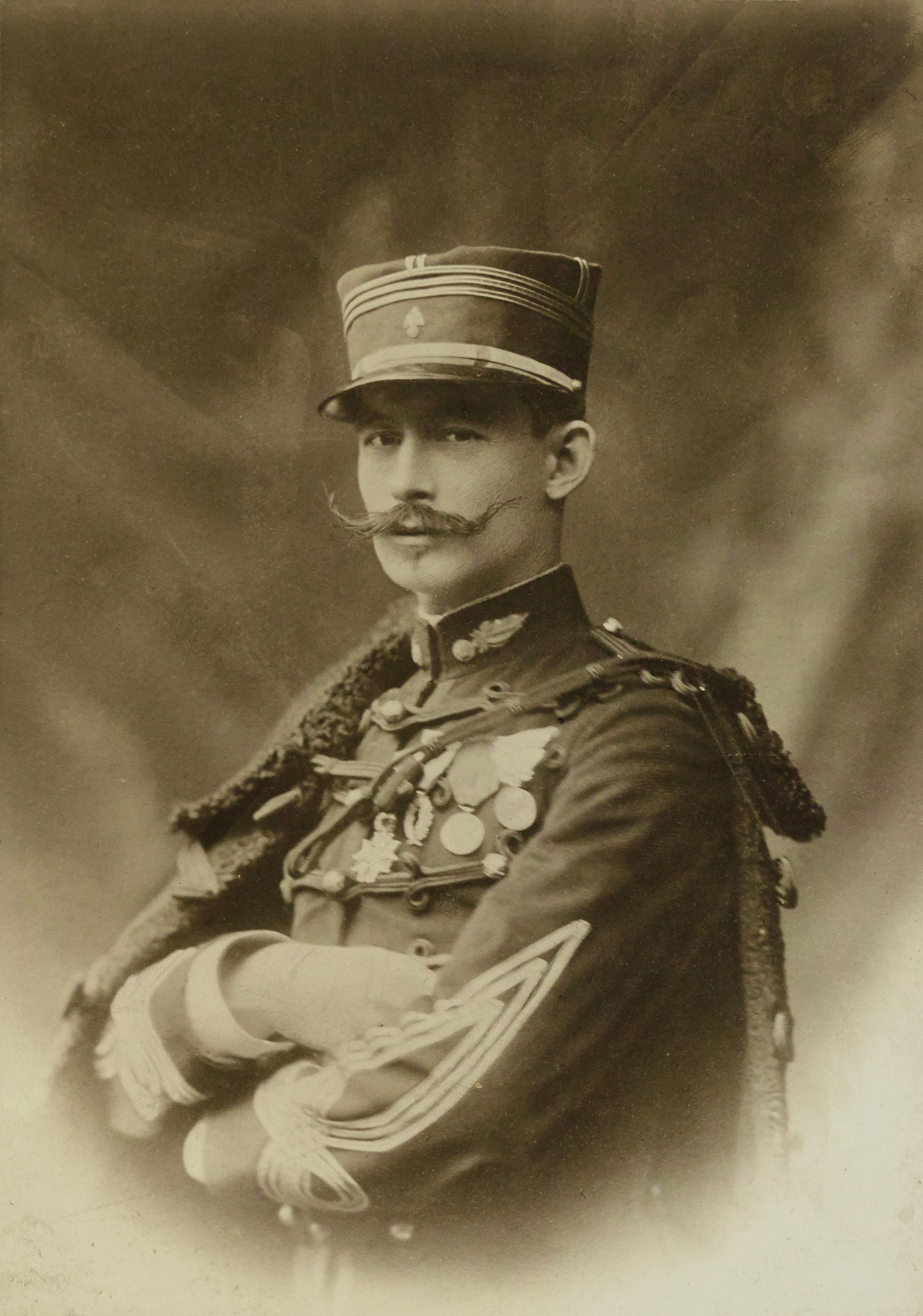
Joalland in 1901 by Eugène Pirou

Paul-Jules Joalland (8 November 1870 – 27 September 1940) was a French officer, known mainly for completing the Voulet–Chanoine Mission.

He was one of the six officers of the latter expedition, and was an artillery expert with the rank of lieutenant. The Voulet-Chanoine Mission was commanded by the captains Paul Voulet and Julien Chanoine, entrusted in 1898 by the government with the mission to explore and conquer the territories between the Niger River and Lake Chad, with the ultimate goal to unify, Jointly with other two similar expeditions, all French territories in West Africa.

The brutalities and massacres committed by the expedition after leaving Senegal brought the authorities to replace Voulet and Chanoine with Lieutenant Colonel Klobb; the latter was killed close to Zinder by Voulet on 14 July 1899, and shortly after Voulet and Chanoine were killed by their troops, that recognized as commander Joalland, who was promoted to the rank of captain.

Joalland left Zinder on 3 October, reaching, with 170 riflemen, Lake Chad; hearing later that the Foureau–Lamy Mission, advancing from the Sahara, was close, he went up the east side of the lake, and met it on February. The two joint missions, under the command of Major Lamy of the Saharian Mission, now returned south to Joalland's base camp on the right bank of the Chari River.

On 21 April 1900 Joalland and Lamy encountered the Gentil Mission, that had been proceeding from the Congo River. The following day all the French forces united clashed with the greatest ruler in the region, Rabih az-Zubayr; the French triumphed, guaranteeing the conquest of the Chad Basin. Before the end of the year, Joalland returned with his men back home, after having successfully completed the mission.

In 1927 Joalland was given the honorary title of commander of the Légion d'honneur, the premier distinction in France. Two years later he was nominated Brigadier General of colonial troops. He died on 28 September 1940.
