= Mercedes-Benz Fintail =

Mercedes-Benz vehicles

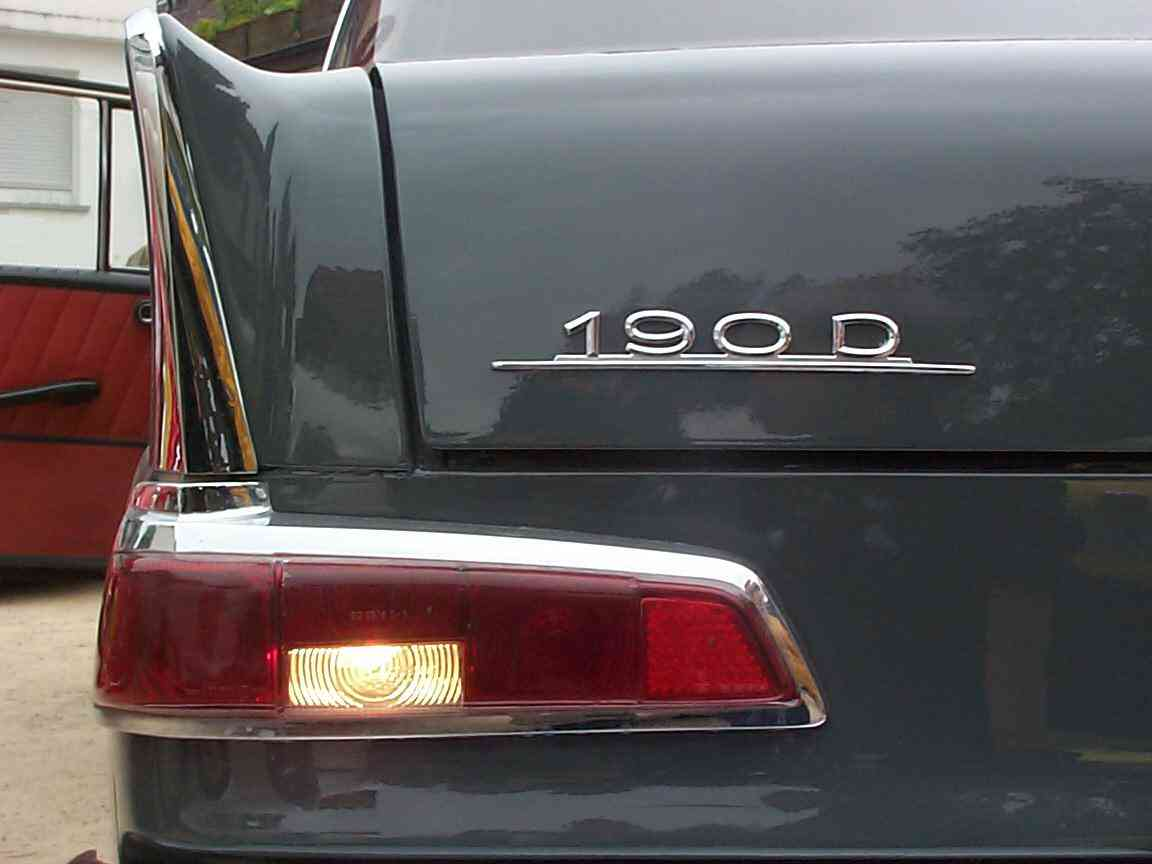
Mercedes-Benz W110 fintail

Mercedes-Benz Fintail (German: Heckflosse) is a nickname for saloon cars of the W110, W111, and W112 series produced by Mercedes from 1959 to 1968. These replaced the Ponton-series saloon cars introduced in 1953.

These series' modest tailfin-era styling reflected the US-led trend. In Mercedes terminology, the short rear fins were designated Peilstege (lit. 'bearing bars', from peilen ‘take a bearing, find the direction’ + Steg ‘bar’), parking aids which marked the end of the car for aid in backing.

The production series included:

- Four-cylinder saloon cars
  - 1961–68 Mercedes-Benz W110 — 190c, 190Dc (1961–65), 200, 200D, 230 (1961–65)
- Six-cylinder saloon cars
  - 1959–68 Mercedes-Benz W111 — 220b, 220Sb, 220SEb, 230S
  - 1961–65 Mercedes-Benz W112 — 300SE
