= Tasuma =

2004 Burkinabé comedy-drama film

- Directed by: Kollo Daniel Sanou
- Screenplay by: Kollo Daniel Sanou
- Produced by: Kollo Daniel Sanou
- Starring: Serge Henri; Aï Keïta; Besani Raoul Khalil
- Music by: Cheick Tidiane Seck
- Release date: 1 August 2004
- Running time: 90 minutes (1 hour 30 minutes)
- Country: Burkina Faso
- Languages: French; Dyula

Tasuma is a 2004 comedy-drama directed, written and produced by Kollo Daniel Sanou which tells the story of a Burkinabé war veteran who had fought for France abroad returning to his home village.

== Plot ==
Sogo (Mamadou Zerbo) is a war-battered veteran who fought for France in World War II and the Indochina Wars. Due to his bravery and ferocity in battle Sogo has earned the nickname Tasuma (the fire) and fears no one, including government officials. He is also civil-minded and kind-hearted, and has promised the women of his village gasoline-powered mill to grind their millet with the military pension he has earned. Coming home to his childhood village however Sogo finds himself unable to access his pension. After many years of being denied the money which is rightfully his, Sogo returns to his village with a gun in hand. After being sent to jail, the women of the village rally for Sogo to be set free.

== Cast ==
- Mamadou Zerbo (as Sogo)
- Aï Keïta
- Noufou Ouédraogo (as Papa)
- Besani Raoul Kjalil
- Serges Henri
- Safiatou Sanou
- Sonia Karen Sanou
- Stanislas Soré

== Themes ==
Although a comedy, the film containers the serious theme of thousands of African soldiers who fought for France in the major wars of the 21st-century but never received the recognition nor the reimbursement they deserved.

== Reception ==
The film was well received by critics, with praise especially for Mamadou Zerbo performance as Sogo. Cinema critic Dave Kehr noted though that the film director Sanou was all to happy to have his film fell back on old tropes of African cinema such as the folkloric theme and the setting of the noble village in opposition to the corrupt outside world.

Tasuma was released in the U.S. on DVD in 2007 as a double-feature with another Burkinabé film, Sia, le rêve du python.
