= Seasonal migration in Niger =

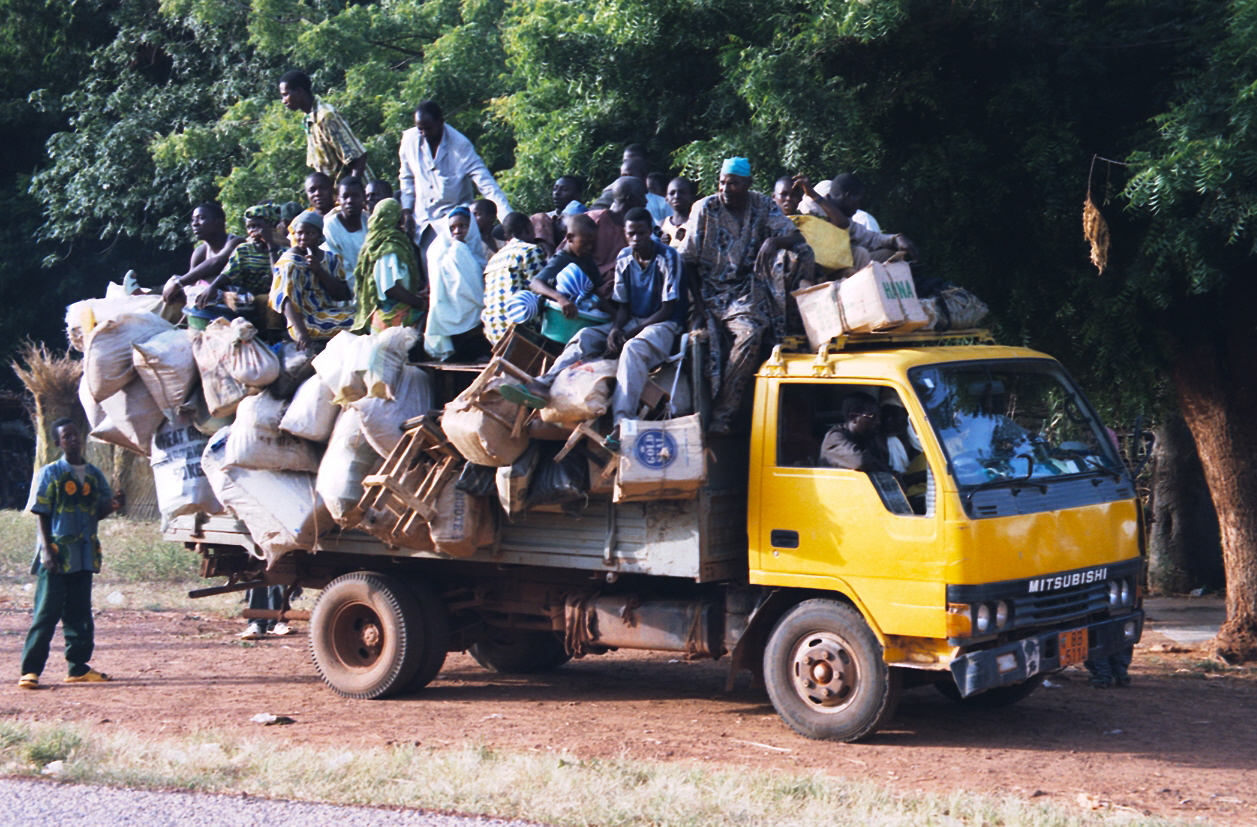
A truck, like many seen on West Africa roads, picks up travelers along a road in southwest Niger.

Seasonal migration, locally called the Exode, plays an important part of the economic and cultural life of the West African nation of Niger. While it is a common practice in many nations, Niger sees as much as a third of its rural population travel for seasonal labour, during the Sahelian nation's long dry season. Common patterns of seasonal travel have been built up over hundreds of years, and destinations and work vary by community and ethnic group.

== Nigerien Exode ==
About 78% of the almost 14 million people in Niger are engaged in crop or livestock agriculture, many in small rural villages operating at subsistence levels. As a solution to both the variability of harvests in the dry Sahel and a way to earn currency, Nigerien communities often seek alternate and seasonal sources of income. Each year, during the dry season following harvest, men from many communities in rural Niger travel for temporary work. That process, called the Exode (French for Exodus) normally takes place between January and April in Niger, but it is a process common to many other nations of West Africa.

== Scope and patterns ==
Historically, different ethnic and regional communities have traveled to different areas. The patterns are in part inherited from precolonial trade networks; cross-border ethnic solidarities; colonial-era industrial, mining/and harvest projects and the attraction of areas with greater work potential, combined with communities of immigrants from the source ethnic group. Areas in the north of the country, where stock raising is more common, see around 20% of the total population migrate for season work, but in the south, dominated by small farming communities, as much as a third of the population travels for seasonal work.

While some women take part, most who take part in the Nigerien Exode are men (unmarried and married) between 15 and 40 years old. Certain communities have traditions of women traveling for seasonal work both domestically and abroad, but it is purely a male preserve in others. Most men travel outside Niger, but cities like Maradi and Niamey also will see a large seasonal influx seeking labor. The major destinations remain Nigeria, which shares large Hausa ethnic communities with Niger, and the former French colonies of Côte d'Ivoire, Togo, Benin and Burkina Faso. In southern destinations, agricultural work is available long after the season has passed in Niger, and cities offer a variety of casual labor. The famines of the 1960s–1980s Sahel drought helped to cement such seasonal migration patterns.

Men from a community will often travel together to the same towns on each year, many to the same areas that their fathers had traveled. For many in rural communities that pursue subsistence farming, that provides most of their yearly cash income and is thus a crucial element of the rural economy, but it is not counted in the formal economy of Niger. Cash earned is partially spent abroad for necessities such as clothing, carried back at the end of the season, or sent via friends and clan or ethnic networks. A 2008 study found that not only most migrant workers never use of banks or money transfer systems but also the Exode period is often a time that men will take out informal loans against their expected seasonal earnings.

=== Disease spread ===
Men on Exode may also bring back sexually transmitted diseases from their season abroad. That has been flagged as a potential vector for HIV/AIDS to enter Niger, which currently has one of the lowest infection rates in the world.

Measles outbreaks (largely among young children) still occur in Niger, in part because of the low vaccination rate and in part due from the transhumance seasonal migration of semi-nomadic herding populations. Sporadic outbreaks in Nigerien communities were found to have occurred beginning at the end of the rainy season, when many rural populations begin seasonal migration pattern, with traveling children often missing their vital second immunization booster against the disease.

== Ethnic differentiation ==
Zarma-Songhai men often travel to Ghana and Burkina Faso, retracing a pattern of migration recorded from at least the 17th century, when Zarma soldiers were recruited to fight for the small kingdoms in what is now northern Ghana and southern Burkina Faso. The trade networks that resulted from the migration survived throughout the colonial period, and they also allowed Djerma a way of escaping to British-controlled Gold Coast Colony during times of particularly onerous French forced labour under the Indigénat as well as in times of drought in the 1910s, 1930s and 1940s.

The example of the Zarrma-Songhai of Niger's migration to the former Gold Coast Colony is memorably portrayed by French filmmaker Jean Rouch in his film "Jaguar" (1954-1955). For the film and accompanying academic study, Rouch joins an urban educated Songhai (Damouré Zika), a Sorko fisherman (Illo Gaoudel), and a Fula herdsman (Lam Ibrahima Dia) who travel from the Niger river town of Ayorou to Accra and Kumasi. The Songhai finds work with other Songhai in an Accra lumber market, the Sorko fishes the coast among Ewe fishermen to finance a small business in Accra, and the Fula finds a job selling perfumes with a family member in Kumasi market.

Hausa communities in Niger often send men south to Nigeria during the Exode, not only to majority-Hausa areas in the north of the nation but also to large cities such as Lagos that contain networks of Hausa immigrants. Hausa immigrant communities, as far afield as Ghana, also provide a focus for Nigerien seasonal migration. During the late pre-colonial and the early colonial period, Hausa communities also saw frequent labor migrations to escape rule by states linked to the Sokoto Caliphate to the south and the French to the north and west.

Fula communities, scattered across all of West Africa, provide a frame for Nigerien Wodaabe-Fula seasonal labor networks as far afield as Abidjan in Côte d'Ivoire and Lagos in Nigeria. Wodaabe women are more likely to travel for seasonal work migration than other groups, especially the Hausa people, and they often face discrimination in Nigerian communities to which they travel.

Tuareg communities in the north, like the pastoralist Fula, have their own established seasonal migration patterns revolving around moving their herds in transhumance cycles for pastures and markets. However, they too see seasonal labor migration. Algeria and Libya and south into Nigeria are the more common destinations, amongst Tuareg communities of the complex interrelated Kels or clan structure. The successful export industry coming from the Aïr Mountains oases production of produce such as onions carries other local men as far south as Côte d'Ivoire. Tuareg men are often seen in cities across the Sahel region working in security, an evolution of the traditional self-imposed cultural preference for certain jobs by aristocratic or warrior caste Tuareg men.

== Pattern of emigration ==
Exode traditions also provide the basis for modern longer term emigration from Niger to the Maghreb and to Europe. Niger is a transit point for immigrants from throughout West Africa, traveling by truck and bus northward, especially to Libya, a frequent starting point in attempting to cross to Europe.

== See also ==
- Agriculture in Niger
- Economy of Niger
- Sahel drought
- 2005–06 Niger food crisis
- Seasonal human migration
- Migrants' African routes
