= Agriculture in Niger =

Agriculture is the primary economic activity of a majority of Niger's 17 million citizens.

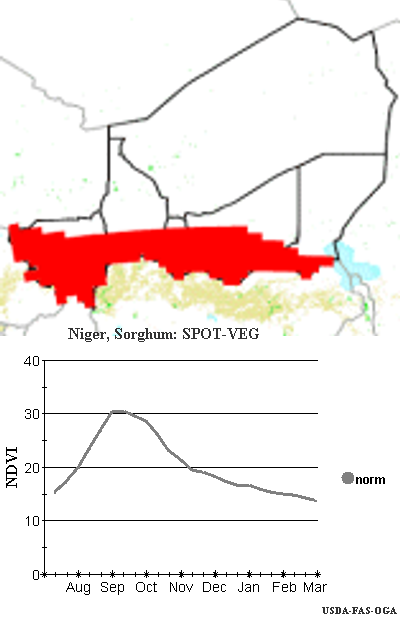
Map and growing season for the Nigerien Sorghum crop. Chart shows Normalized Difference Vegetation Index against Long Rains Dry Season (July–February), measuring normal years crop growth in the major Sorghum producing areas of Niger.

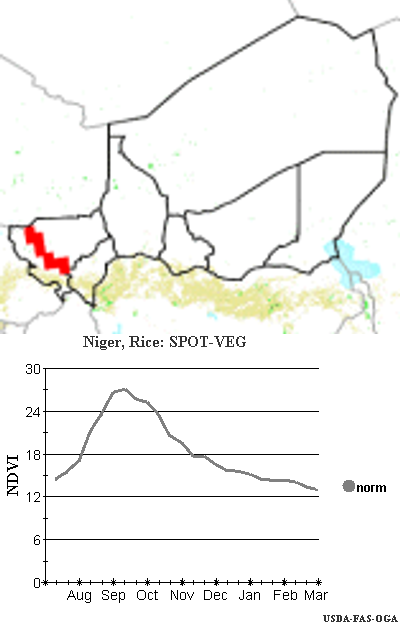
Map and growing season for the Nigerien Rice crop. Chart shows Normalized Difference Vegetation Index against Long Rains Dry Season (July–Feb), measuring normal years crop growth in the major Rice producing areas of Niger.

The agricultural economy is based largely upon internal markets, subsistence agriculture, and the export of raw commodities: food stuffs and cattle to neighbors. Niger, a landlocked Sub-Sahara African nation, over the past two decades has consistently been ranked near or at the bottom of worldwide indexes of the Human development index, GDP, and per capita income. Economic activity centres on subsistence agriculture, animal husbandry, re-export trade, and export of uranium. The 50% devaluation of the West African CFA franc in January 1994 boosted exports of livestock, cowpeas, onions, and the products of Niger's small cotton industry. Exports of cattle to neighboring Nigeria, as well as groundnuts and their oil remain the primary non-mineral exports.

== Overall economy ==
Niger's economy is based largely on subsistence crops, livestock, and some of the world's largest uranium deposits. Drought cycles, desertification, a 3.4% population growth rate and the drop in world demand for uranium have undercut an already marginal economy. Traditional subsistence farming, herding, small trading, and informal markets dominate an economy that generates few formal sector jobs. Between 1988 and 1995 28% to 30% of the total economy of Niger was in the unregulated Informal sector, including small and even large scale rural and urban production, transport and services. Current GDP per capita is very low by world standards, in part explained through the involvement of a majority of the population in very small-scale agriculture, which generates little monetary exchange.

== Geography ==
A majority of Niger's population rural residents engaged in crop tending are clustered in the south centre and south west of the nation, in those areas (the Sahel) which can expect to receive between 300mm to 600mm of rainfall annually. A small area in the southern tip of the nation, surrounding Gaya can expect to receive 700mm to 900mm or rainfall. Northern areas which support crops, such as the southern portions of the Aïr Massif and the Kaouar oasis rely upon oases and a slight increase in rainfall due to mountain effects. Large portions of the northwest and far east of the nation, while within the Sahara desert, see just enough seasonal rainfall to support semi-nomadic animal husbandry. The populations of these areas, mostly Tuareg, Wodaabe - Fula, and Toubou, practise Transhumance: traveling south to pasture and sell animals in the dry season, north into the Sahara in the brief rainy season, while maintaining settled communities along these routes.

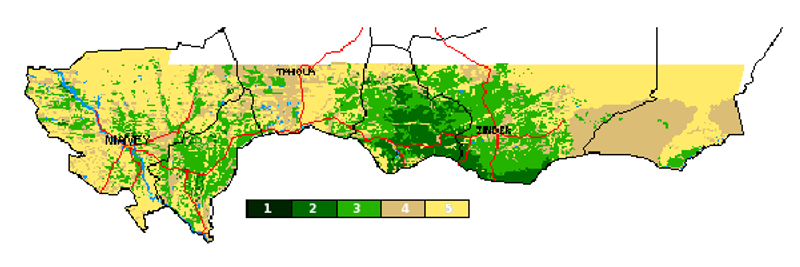
Cropland Use Indicator, drawn from Normalized Difference Vegetation Index (NDVI) data, for period 1986–1988. Scale is: 1= 70% - 100% Crop coverage :: 2= 50% - 70% Crop coverage :: 3= 30% - 50% Crop coverage :: 4= 5% - 30% Crop coverage :: 5= 0% - 5% Crop coverage.

== Agriculture production ==
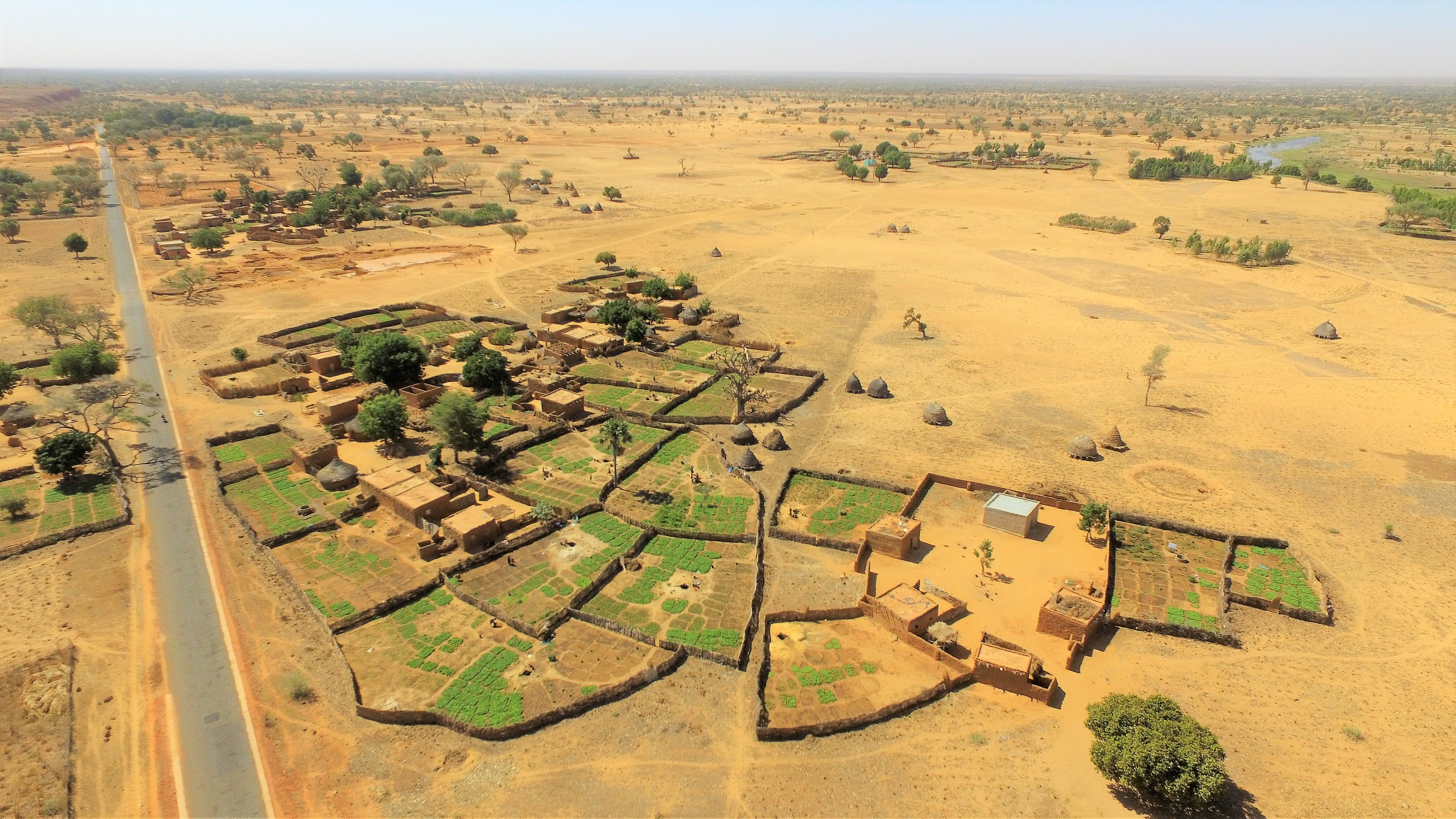
Vegetable gardens near Birni N'Konni

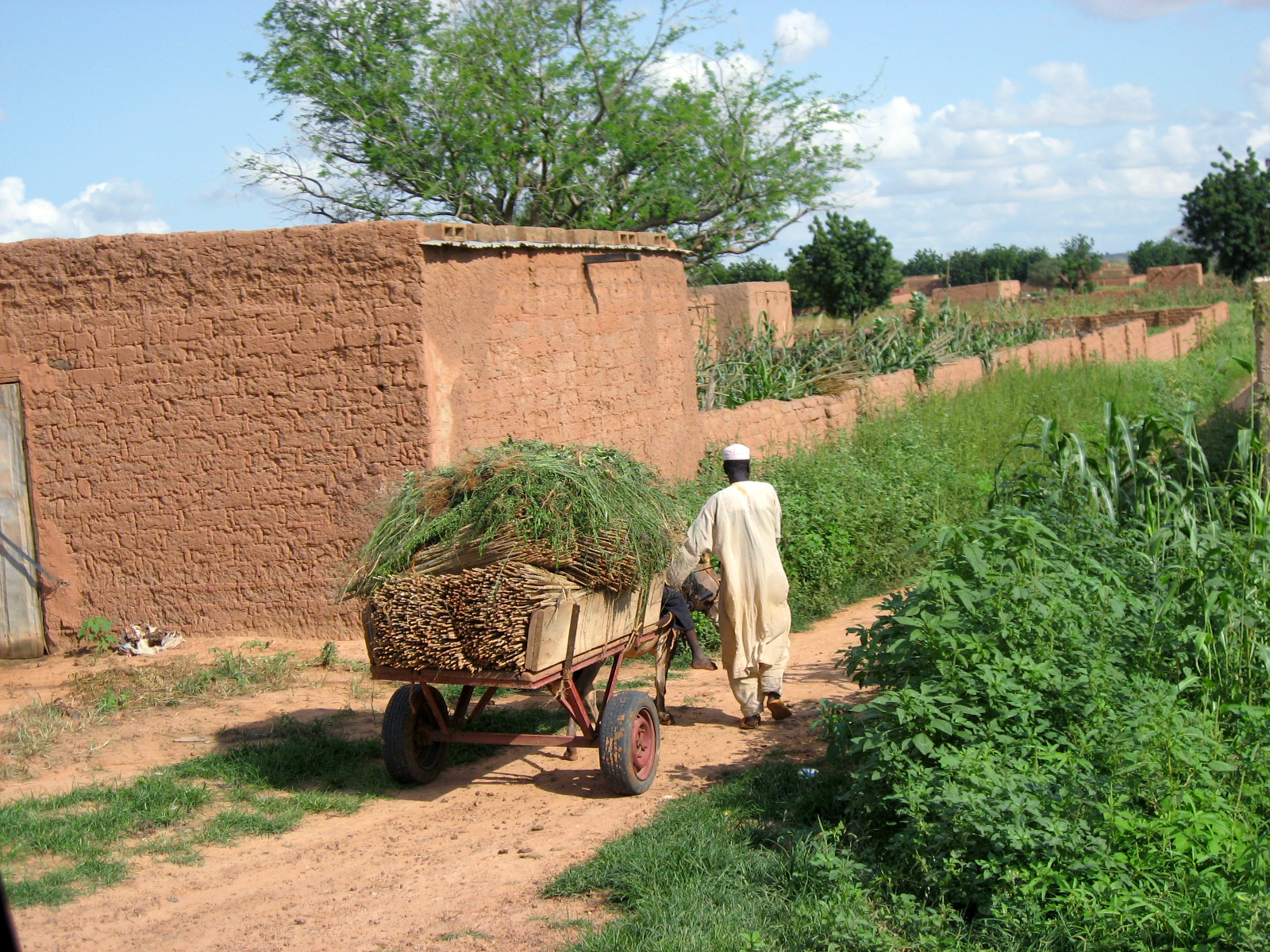
A farmer collecting his millet harvest near Koremairwa in the Dosso department.

Niger's agricultural and livestock sectors are the mainstay of all but 18% of the population. Fourteen percent of Niger's GDP is generated by livestock production (camels, goats, sheep and cattle), said to support 29% of the population. Thus 53% of the population is actively involved in crop production. The 15% of Niger's land that is arable is found mainly along its southern border with Nigeria.

Pearl millet, sorghum, and cassava are Niger's principal rain-fed subsistence crops. Irrigated rice for internal consumption, while expensive, has, since the devaluation of the CFA franc, sold for below the price of imported rice, encouraging additional production. Cowpeas and onions are grown for commercial export, as are small quantities of garlic, peppers, potatoes, and wheat.

== Drought and environmental degradation ==
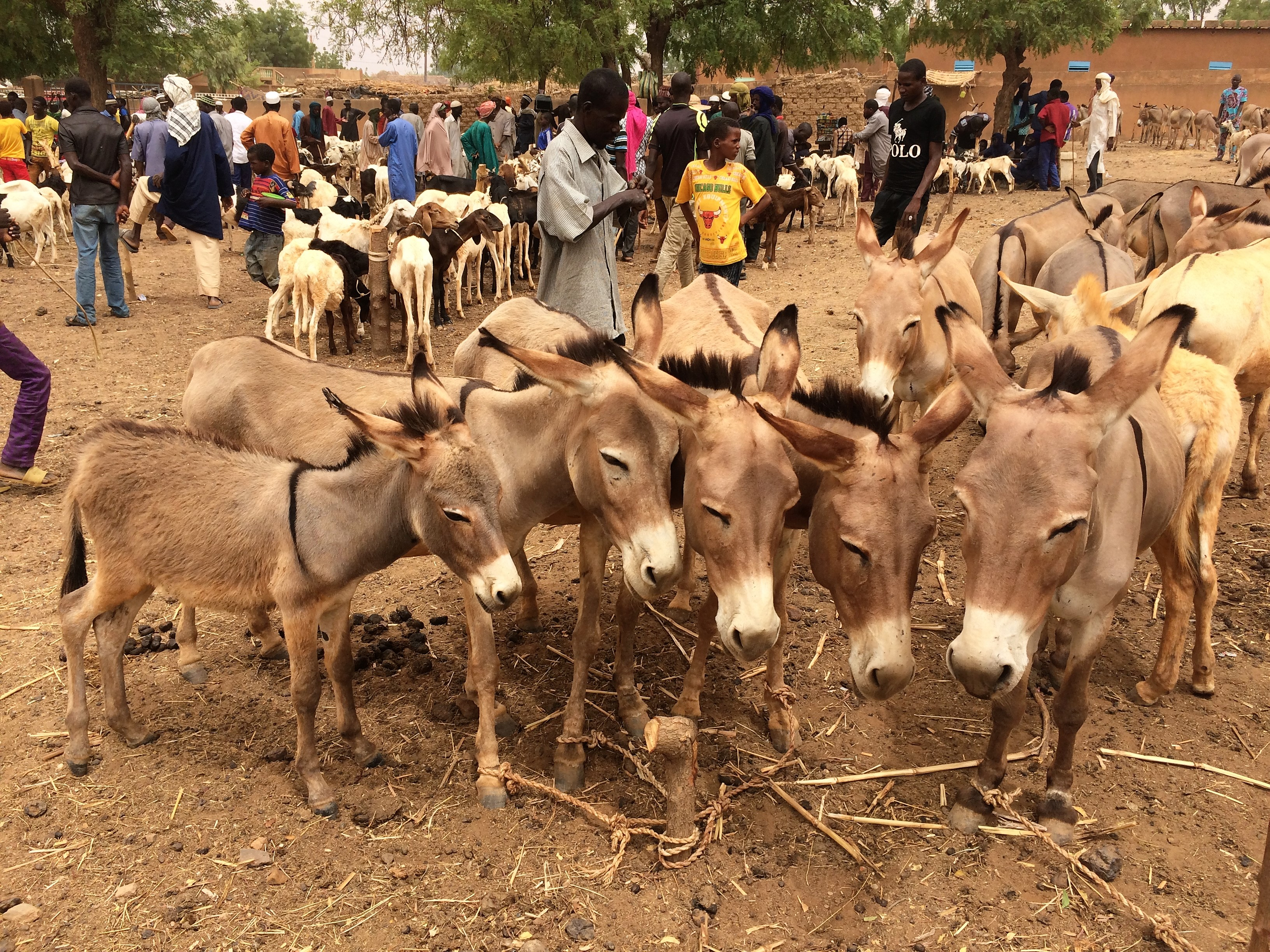
Livestock market in Boubon

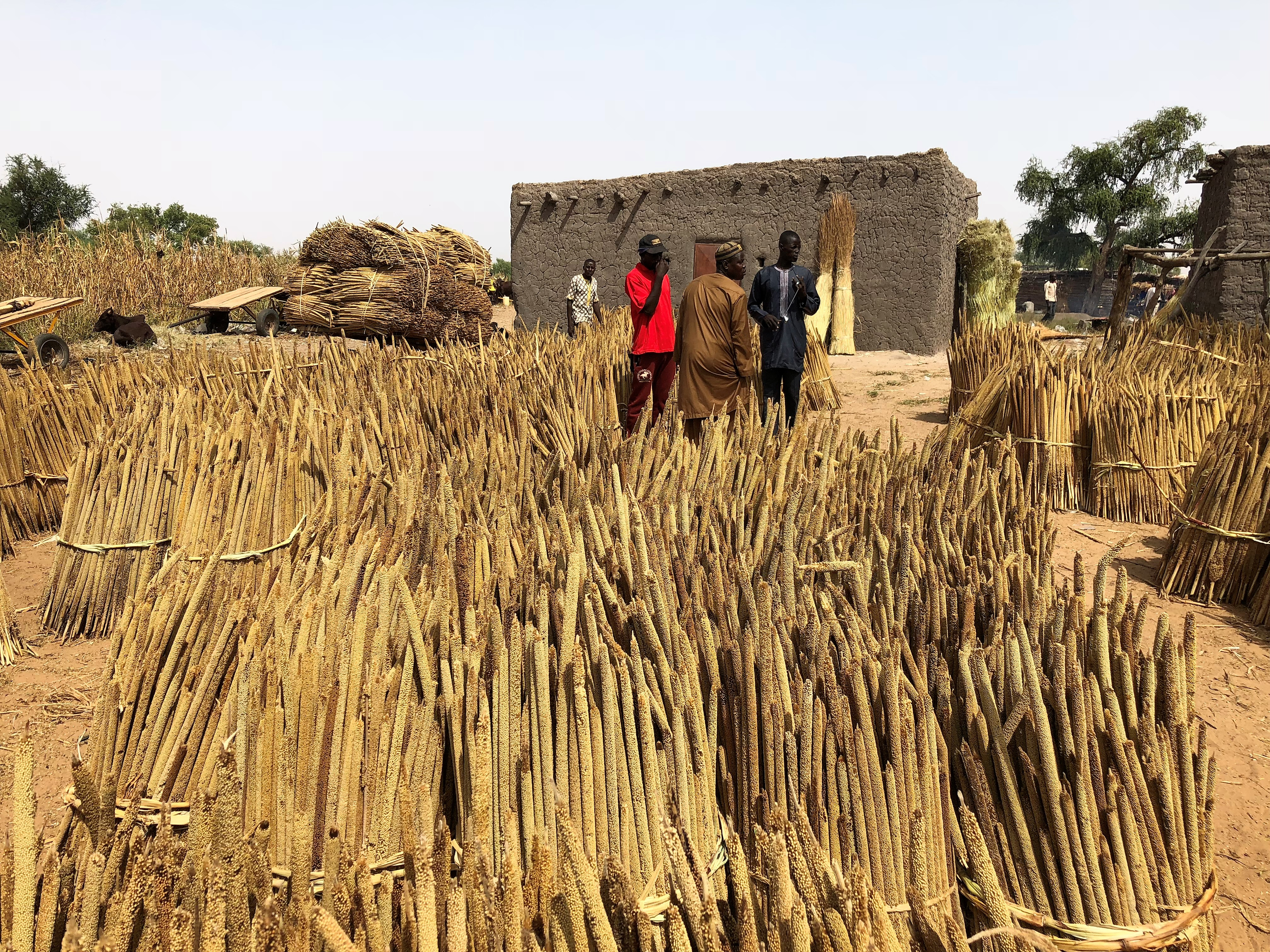
Sale of millet on the N'Gonga market

Rainfall varies and when insufficient, Niger has difficulty feeding its population and must rely on grain purchases and food aid to meet food requirements. Rains, as in much of the Sahel, have been marked by annual variability. This has been especially true in the 20th century, with the most severe drought on record beginning in the late 1960s and lasting, with one break, well into the 1980s. The long-term effect of this, especially to pastoralist populations remains in the 21st century, with those communities which rely upon cattle, sheep, and camels husbandry losing entire herds more than once during this period. Recent rains remain variable. For instance, the rains in 2000 were not good, those in 2001 were plentiful and well distributed.

Food shortfalls have also been caused by other factors. Market prices driven up by drought and a plague of desert locust in 2005–2006 caused a major food crisis in parts of the nation.

Shortage of good farmland has led to a number of innovations to farm marginal, often laterite soils and soil degraded by overfarming, wind, desertification, and drought. Women in particular are often given poor plots of land (in inherited sections known as "Gamana") to garden, and have developed specific crops for poor soil and water conditions. These typically include ocra and malahiya. External organisations have tried introducing alternative crops, such as the fruit of the Ziziphus mauritiana tree ("Indian Jujube", marketed by the International Crops Research Institute for the Semi-Arid Tropics (ICRISAT) under the name of "Pomme du Sahel" or Sahel Apple) and the leaves and seeds of the Moringa oleifera. Farmers use specialty water conservation techniques, "water microcatchments" or planting pits known as zai holes, planting of crops among certain trees, planting in raised beds, drip irrigation, and usage of water collected in the natural stone bottomed low areas common in the south east of the nation. This approach has been termed the Bioreclamation of Degraded Lands.

== Market effects ==
While Nigerien farmers are often dependent on the agricultural market for portions of their production and consumption, much of Nigerien farming is subsistence agriculture outside the marketplace. The 2006 Human Development Index ranked Niger sixth from worst in the world, with a HDI of 0.370: 174 of 179 nations. Groundnuts, and to a lesser degree Cotton, introduced by former colonial power France in the 1930s and 1950s respectively, account for most of the world market for Nigerien industrial agriculture. Prior to the mass exploitation of uranium in the early 1970s, groundnut oil was the largest Nigerien export by worth.

== External trade and investment in agriculture ==
Of Niger's exports, foreign exchange earnings from livestock, although difficult to quantify, are second only to those from uranium. Actual exports far exceed official statistics, which often fail to detect large herds of animals informally crossing into Nigeria. Some hides and skins are exported and some are transformed into handicrafts. Hausa areas in the south center of the nation are especially known for their leather industries. Zinder and Maradi are two foci of leatherwork and trade.

== See also ==
- Economy of Niger
- Sahel drought
- 2005–06 Niger food crisis
