= Tombokoirey =

Tombokoirey may refer to a pair of Nigerien municipalities of Dosso Region:

- Tombokoirey I
- Tombokoirey II
