= Niger famine =

Niger famine could refer to:

- The Sahel drought and resulting famine of the 1970s and early 1980s
- The 2005-06 Niger food crisis
