= Mali and the International Monetary Fund =

The Malian flag.

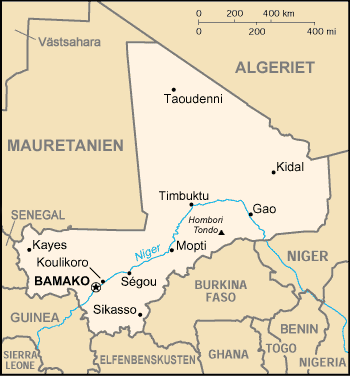
Map of Mali and its neighbors.

Mali joined the International Monetary Fund (IMF) on September 27, 1963. Since joining, Mali has been an active member of the Fund, having made 18 arrangements to borrow money since its membership began, primarily aimed at addressing stability and security issues in the country. Though Mali has had a steadily positive GDP growth rate since 2011 and a large amount of natural gold reserves, its economic and social fragility have caused developmental challenges as ethnic violence and terrorism weaken the government. The IMF projects that Mali will continue to have a GDP growth rate of around 5%, and a contained level of inflation, but warns that the situation could rapidly deteriorate without the implementation of programs for stability and resilience.

The present IMF outlook for Mali's economic prospects tends negative due to their issues with internal poverty and strife. Mali is currently ranked as one of the world's poorest countries by the United Nations Development Programme, and their agriculture-heavy economy leaves them vulnerable to weather issues. Demographic issues have led to a uniquely unstable situation that has been exploited by militant groups, threatening the centralization and stability of the government. Corruption has also been an area of concern for the IMF.

== Malian economy and history ==
=== Pre-colonial era ===
The Mali Empire was one of the richest in the world at the time, and its mineral wealth was renowned across the world. The rich gold deposits and trading centers, such Djenné and Timbuktu, gave it a strong position in western Africa. Though the empire was replaced by other nations such as the Songhai Empire and the Fulani Empire, the natural wealth of the region made it a trade center through to the 19th century. Ultimately, the Malian nations collapsed under internal religious pressures and external political influence from the French empire and they were integrated into French Sudan. During the colonial period, Mali served as a source of labor for the French West African colonies.

=== Post-colonial era ===
Mali gained its independence in 1960, and moved to implement socialist policies designed in the style of the Soviet system at the time. This would not last long, however, and in 1968, a coup ensued and the new government moved to implement economic reforms. The Sahel drought and internal political struggles crippled the reforms however, and they were not able to achieve much success. The new government took control as a one-party state, and agreed to some structural adjustment economic reforms with the IMF. The austerity imposed by these reforms led to unrest, however, and by the 1990s the nation had transitioned to a new democratic state.

== IMF contributions and loans ==
Mali has been a heavy borrower from the IMF, currently owing about 238 million SDRs, the equivalent of around $327 million. The majority of these loans are aimed at addressing instability and lack of economic diversity in the country. The IMF claims that these projects have seen success in spite of the difficult conditions, helping quell instability and address trade concerns. The short-term macroeconomic outlook seems positive, though program implementations have been slowed down by structural issues. Mali has been praised for its efforts in meeting both IMF goals and those set by the West African Economic and Monetary Union, of which it is a founding member.

Current projects are focused on improving Mali's revenue collection, which currently represents a small portion of their overall GDP. To address this issue, the IMF recently approved a new loan to work on improving administrative inefficiencies and combat rising fuel prices. Other areas of focus include the struggling state energy company which is currently going through financial difficulties, and vulnerability to shocks from fluctuating prices of gold, cotton, and fuel.

== 2012 crisis and instability ==
=== Background ===
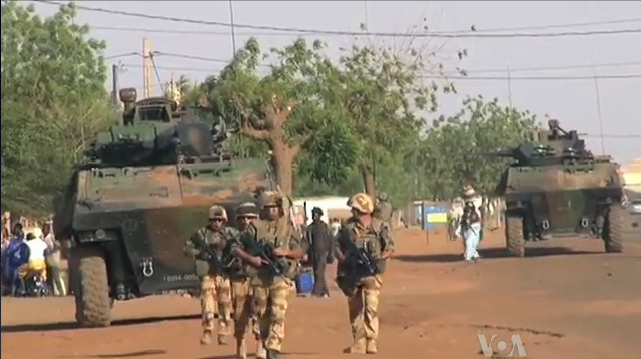
French soldier in Gao in 2013.

IMF research claims that much of Mali's instability and structural issues stem from the 2012 Malian coup d'état in northern Mali. The jihadist-backed Tuareg rebellion allowed insurgents to seize control of the northern region, defeating Mali's security forces. The defeated military seized control of the weakened government leading to international condemnation. During this period of governmental transition, the separatists and jihadists were able to strengthen their control of the northern regions, further weakening the new administration. International condemnation further weakened the economy as their neighbors enforced fuel sanctions. The nation is now dependent on fuel trucks from Senegal and the Ivory Coast. Eventually, infighting amongst the separatists and rebels allowed international forces to restore order to the region and take back control from the jihadists. The situation has worsened in recent years, with more than 300 deaths in 2018. With this structural instability and governmental weakness, distribution of resources and services in the recently occupied north has been difficult.

The north continues to face unrest and instability, but projects like the United Nations' MINUSMA have aimed to restore governmental control over the region and defeat the remaining rebels and insurgents.

=== Economic impacts and IMF recovery program ===
The direct impacts of the crisis include reduced economic output in services and banking, and displaced nearly 400,000 Malians. The recurrent attacks and insurgencies has hindered IMF staff's ability to implement their programs to address government reform and economic policy. In the immediate aftermath, economic growth went from an expected 5% to minus 0.8%. Security spending had to be adjusted to face the immediate threat to the nation, and as such public spending had to be dropped down.

The IMF's projects to address this involve stabilization of tax revenue collection, promoting trade, and encouraging structural stability in wake of the coup. To be able to implement effective measures, they recommend increasing taxes to improve their tax-to-GDP ratio relative to their West African neighbors. In association with France and the UN, some agreements have been made between the government and the Tuareg separatists, allowing for elections to take place. However, jihadists attacks have worsened in some regions with other rebel groups seeking to take advantage of the situation.

== Economic diversification and vulnerability ==
=== Economic revenues ===
Mali is heavily reliant on its gold mining and agriculture as part of its exports and GDP. Agriculture represents 30% of their GDP, and gold and cotton combined represent 80% of their exports. Gold alone has represented over half of exports for nearly two decades. The reliance on mining leaves them vulnerable to exploitation by multi-national enterprises shifting their profits to other countries, causing Mali to lose out on tax streams. The IMF has recommended programs to close down loopholes in their tax system to force multinational enterprises to contribute further to Mali's tax base. Current corporate guidelines in Mali allow for very loose tax management. Although the authorities have taken steps to follow IMF suggestions and increase tax revenue, overly optimistic budget projections have clouded attempts to fix the issue.

=== Vulnerability ===
The country's demographics further endanger their economic and political stability. 50% of the population is under 15, and their population is expected to increase from 18 million to 45 million by 2050. Price fluctuations combined with the rapid population growth have led to issues in the provision of basic resources and commodities. Food and water instability have been constant issues, with the problem worsening since 2012 as international organizations and NGOs refuse to be involved in a region with a high potential for hostage-taking.
