= The Punishment (1962 film) =

Film by Jean Rouch

- Directed by: Jean Rouch
- Written by: Jean Rouch
- Produced by: Pierre Braunberger
- Starring: Nadine Ballot; Jean-Claude Darnal; Modeste Landry; Jean-Marc Simon; László Szabó
- Cinematography: Michel Brault; Roger Morillière
- Edited by: Annie Tresgot
- Production company: Les Films de la Pléiade
- Release dates: March 10, 1962 (TV release); March 15, 1963 (France)
- Running time: 58 minutes
- Country: France
- Language: French

The Punishment (French: La punition) is a 1962 French film written and directed by Jean Rouch starring Nadine Ballot. The film centers around a young woman who is kicked out of class and spends the day wandering around Paris and talking to men she meets.

It was a French production shot on location in Paris, France. It is considered part of the French New Wave and is a blend of documentary and fiction.

== Plot ==
Nadine, a high school student is kicked out of class for being late instead of going home she decides to wander the streets of Paris where she meets three men. Darnal, a young student, approaches her and, over the course of their conversation, revels he wants to have a sexual relationship with Nadine, but she declines. She asks him about having an adventure, but he says without money or a plan they couldn't. Next she runs into a student she knows: Landry. Together they talk about getting into school next year and they go to the museum. Landry says he may have to return to Africa. Nadine says that sound like an adventure and she should come with him, but he says she wouldn't like it. After they depart Nadine wanders to the bouquinistes, the booksellers on the Seine, and Jean-Marc, an older engineer, strikes up a conversation. He offers her a ride anywhere she wants and she says the Eiffel Tower, but when they arrive its over run with tourists and they instead go back to his apartment. Together they talk about adventure, romance and life with Nadine eventually falling asleep.

The end of the movie is cinema verite footage of Nadine walking around Paris alone and being approached by many different men on the street.

== Cast ==
- Nadine Ballot as Nadine
- Jean-Claude Darnal as the Student
- Modeste Landry as Landry - the African Friend
- Jean-Marc Simon as László Szabó - the engineer

== Production ==
Jean Rouch said that he was in part inspired to make the film based of a day he was kicked out of school and wandered the city instead of going home. Rouch cast Nadine Ballot after having her appear in his previous film Chronicle of a Summer.

== Release ==
It was release in France on television in March 10, 1962 and theatrically released on March 15, 1963.

== Reception ==
Variety's Gene Moskowitz called it an offbeat film made for art house cinema and played particular attention to the camera work, noting it was a continuation of Rouch's "Truth Cinema" style, also known as cinema vérité. Cahiers du Cinema critics were especially taken with Rouch's use of experimental techniques to shoot the film without studio set ups, for example shooting on location on the Champs Elysées.

Contemporary critics consider cinema vérité to be a more narrow category of documentary, but other scholars have noted The Punishment as part of a larger definition and collection of films that helped define cinema vérité.

Daniel Farifax writing for Mubi called the film a companion piece to Chronicle of a Summer and said The Punishment is an example of the "ethnographer's gaze" Rouch brought to the French New Wave.
