= Entente FC =

Nigerien football club

- Full name: Entente Football Club
- Ground: Stade de Dosso; Dosso, Niger
- Capacity: 7,000
- League: Niger Premier League
- 2018: 16th (relegation)
Home colours	Away colours

Entente FC is a Nigerien football club based in Dosso. Their home games are played at Stade de Dosso.
