= Dosso Kingdom =

- c. 1750–c. 1890
- Capital: Dosso
- Common languages: Zarma
- Religion: Islam (official)
- Government: Monarchy
- Historical era: Late Modern Period
  - Established: c. 1750
  - Disestablished: c. 1890
Succeeded by
French Niger

The Dosso Kingdom is a precolonial state in what is now southwest Niger which has survived in a ceremonial role to the modern day.

== Early history ==
The Djerma people of Niger are believed to have migrated from what is now the Fula region around Lac Debo, Mali during the Songhai Empire, and settled first in Zarmaganda in the 16th century. In the 18th century, many Djerma resettled south to the Niger River valley, the Fakara plateau and Zigui in what is now Southwest Niger near Niamey. Forming a number of small communities, each led by a Djermakoy, these polities soon found themselves pressured from the north by the Tuareg and the Fula from the southeast, as well as other ethnic groups in the area. While Djermakoy Aboubacar founded the Dosso state from his own Taguru clan around 1750, it remained a small collection of villages in the Dallol Bosso valley until the 1820s, when it led much of the resistance to the Sokoto Caliphate. While Dosso fell under the control of the Amir of Gando (a sub division of Sokoto) between 1849 and 1856, they retained their Djermakoy and the nominal rule of a much larger Djerma territory, and were converted to Islam. Under Djermakoy Kossom (r. 1856-65), Dosso united all of the eastern Djerma, and left a small state stretching from Tibbo and Beri in the north, to Gafiadey in the south, and to Bankadey and Tombokware in the east.

== French colonialism ==
French colonial forces first entered the area in the 1890s and found Dosso allied with local Fula communities and small states like Kebbi against other Djerma states, the Dendi, the Gourounsi (in modern Burkina Faso) the Hausa states to the east (in what is now southern Niger), and still struggling to retake the territory it held in 1865.

Zarmakoy Attikou (r.1897-1902) took the military help offered by the French forces based in Karimama (now Benin), but found that after the military conquest of his enemies in 1898, the French forces were stationed in Dosso, where they would stay for the next 60 years. Attikou had delegated the negotiations to his prince Awta, and this future Zarmakoy hitched his star to French power. Despite tensions, the French found one of their few allies in the region, and this alliance of necessity came to benefit Dosso as much as it hurt them. With French aid, Zarmakoy Awta (r.1902-13) retained all of what is the modern Dosso Department, and with his help, the French put down revolts led by a charismatic Marabout in the Dosso region in 1906. The Zarmakoy of Dosso was integrated into the French Colonial system through a type of Indirect Rule rare in its scale and continuity in French West Africa. In most places the French established rulers at village level (the Chef du Canton) who were promoted by the French over traditional rulers, and thus were entirely dependent upon the French. At Dosso, the French allowed the Zarmakoy to not only retain but expand his territory and to choose his own successors, keeping continuity with the pre-colonial state, and standing above his own Chefs du Canton at the local level. The French so depended upon the Zarmakoy of Dosso, that in 1923 they moved the capital of the then Military Territory of Niger from Zinder, the home of the powerful pre-colonial Sultanate of Damagaram to a village in Dosso territory which was to become Niamey.

== Independence ==
As independence approached in the 1950s, Niger was one of the few areas of French West Africa without a growing political class. The Zarmakoy of Dosso, as patron of the Djerma region, became a powerful political king maker for the coming order. Political parties vied for the support of the Zarmakoy and the powerful Hausa leaders in the east and the then Zarmakoy, Issoufou Seydou, played a leading role in Nigerien politics at the time of independence. Zarmakoy Seydou was a founder of the PPN, and later the UNIS parties, and was Vice-President and Minister of Justice from December 1958-October 1959. Today the Dosso aristocracy continue to hold influential positions throughout Nigerien government, with a majority of post independence leaders having been drawn from the Djerma.

The city of Dosso also retains an important place, with a large population of aristocratic class Djerma who rely on the patronage of the Zarmakoy, as the more traditional ruling class reject modern careers.

== Rulers chronology ==
- c.1750– ?; Zarmakoy Aboubacar
- ?–?; Zarmakoy Laouzo
- ?–?; Zarmakoy Gounabi
- ?–?; Zarmakoy Amirou
- 1856–1865; Zarmakoy Kassam/Kossom Baboukabiya
- 1865–1890; Zarmakoy Abdou Kyantou Baba
- 1890–1897; Zarmakoy Alfa Atta
- 1897–1902; Zarmakoy Attikou
- 1902–1913; Zarmakoy Aoûta/Awta
- 1913–1924; Zarmakoy Moussa
- 1924–1938; Zarmakoy Saidou
- 1938–1953; Zarmakoy Moumouni
- 1953–1962; Zarmakoy Hamani
- 1962–1998; Zarmakoy Abdou
- 1998–2000; Zarmakoy Issoufou
- 2000–current; Zarmakoy Maïdanda Saidou
