= Koré Maïroua =

Koré Maïroua Koremairwa
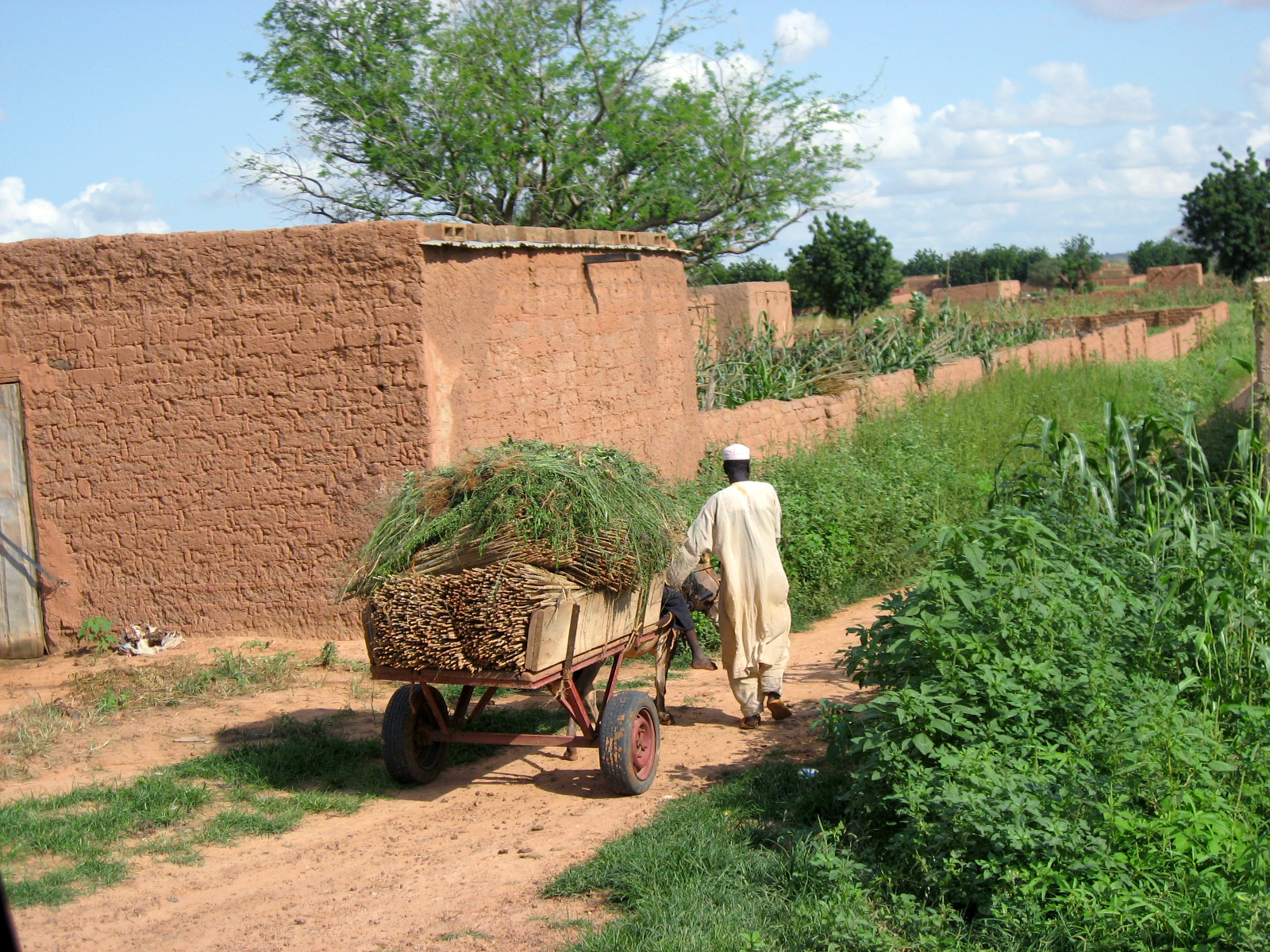
- A farmer collecting millet in Koremairwa village

- Location in Niger
- Coordinates: 13°17′59″N 3°54′24″E
- Country: Niger
- Department: Dosso department
- District: Doutchi District

Area
  - Total: 773.7 km^{2} (298.7 sq mi)
- Elevation: 229 m (751 ft)

Population (2012)
  - Total: 54,251

Koré Maïroua often spelled Koremairwa is a village and commune in south-western Niger. It is the located in Doutchi District in the Dosso (department) approximately 65 kilometres north-east of Dosso. As of the 2012 census, the commune had a population of 54,251 and 7,388 people lived in the village.

The village is primarily agricultural based; millet farming contributes much to the local economy.

Nearby towns and villages include (distance by road) Koukoki (5 km), Galozi (2 km), Rizia Mayaki (9 km), Banizoumbou (14 km) and Angoa Dambane (5 km).
