= Bait al-Qufl =

A Bait al-Qufl ("house of the lock") is a traditional style of storage structure unique to the Musandum Peninsula of Oman. It originated as a means of securing valuable items during the seasonal, summer migration of local villagers to the mountains where they sought improved pasture for their animals and relief from the summer heat. Additionally, the owners of these structures stored seed for the coming year's crop.

The structure of the Bait al-Qufl comprises stone walls and roofing timbers of acacia, originally covered with soil, gravel, and an edging of stone blocks. Now, largely in disuse, most Bait al-Qufl are roofless. The interior is typically recessed to a depth of one to two meters.

The name "house of the lock" derives from the structure's complex double-locking system. To store grain and other items, large clay vessels were placed inside the structure prior to the completion of the roof. The small size of the door, combined with the complex carven lock, prevented wholesale theft of stored grain.
