= Stade de Dosso =

Football stadium in Dosso, Niger

Coordinates: 13°3′20″N 3°12′38″E

Stade de Dosso is a multi-use stadium in Dosso, Niger. It is currently used mostly for football matches and serves as the home venue for Entente FC. The stadium holds 7,000 people.
