= Jaguar (1967 film) =

1967 film by Jean Rouch

- Directed by: Jean Rouch
- Produced by: Pierre Braunberger
- Starring: Damouré Zika, Lam, Illo
- Narrated by: Jean Rouch, Damouré Zika, Lam
- Cinematography: Jean Rouch
- Music by: Enos Amelodon, Tallou Mouzourane, Amisata Gaoudelize
- Release date: September 3, 1967
- Running time: 91 min
- Country: France
- Language: French

Jaguar is a 1967 French ethnographic film directed by Jean Rouch. Set in the 1950s, it follows three men from Niger, Damouré, Lam, and Illo, who travel to the Gold Coast (now Ghana) for work. Much of the dialogue and narration in the film is provided by the three men themselves as they comment on their past experiences on their journey.

After being exhibited at the Venice Film Festival in 1967, the movie finally had a general though limited release in 1971. It was well-received by French audiences and critics, and has since received considerable academic attention due to the film's unconventional framing and its implicit rebuke to chauvinist, one-dimensional European portrayals of life in Africa.

== Plot ==
The film follows three men from Niger: Lam, a cowherd, Illo, a fisherman, and Damouré Zika, an educated dandy. After a brief introduction detailing their lives in Niger, they visit a fortune teller, who warns them that the journey will be difficult, but that things will be very good for them when they return. The fortune teller also recommends that the three protagonists split up when they arrive in Gold Coast, as well as suggesting that they would reunite later on.

The three men then set out on foot to travel to the Gold Coast, seeking work, money, and adventure. Along the way, they encounter a wide variety of peoples and places, and have a series of whimsical interactions with them, alternately scavenging food and begging from local villagers. Upon reaching the border between Niger and the Gold Coast, guards demand papers, which they do not have. They eventually cross the border by walking behind the guard's backs.

Upon arriving in the Gold Coast, the three men split up, working odd-jobs as merchants, manual laborers, foremen, and gold miners in Kumasi and Accra. Damouré also attends a rally by the Nkrumaist Convention People's Party, and becomes notorious for being a jaguar, a slang term that is described as referring to a well-dressed, polite, and sharp young man. Eventually, the season ends, and the men return to their lives in Niger, bearing suitcases full of goods from the Gold Coast–they proceed to give away almost all of these possessions as gifts to other people living in their village. The film closes with narration from Rouch, comparing the journey of the film's characters to that of conquerors of a bygone era.

== Style and production ==
Jaguar's genre is difficult to classify, as it draws on techniques from both documentary film and narrative film. Jean Rouch referred to the film as "cine-fiction", while others have labeled it "ethnofiction", referencing the film's use of techniques associated with ethnography. The concept of the film was collaboratively developed by Rouch, Damoré, and Lam.

The shots used in Jaguar were all filmed in 1954. Three years later, Rouch reunited with Damoré and Lam, who then were recorded chatting as they watched the recorded footage. This running commentary was then incorporated into the film, providing a playful narration for the events of the film that is instrumental in establishing the film's tone.

Several of the scenes that appear to show Damouré, Lam, and Illo travelling or working are in fact fictionalized reenactments. None of the labor performed by the main characters was for a wage: they were compensated instead by Rouch. While the film purports to show them walking across West Africa for months, in reality they traveled most of the distance in Rouch's Land Rover.

Throughout the film, Rouch and the narrators toy with the audience's pre-existing expectations of the film's subjects. For instance, in one sequence, the three travelers pass through a Somba village where everyone walks around nearly naked. At first, Damoré and Lam are dismissive of the Somba, whom they see as primitives, but soon change their opinions and defend the villagers' customs as being perfectly reasonable, while identifying that they themselves are outsiders in this context (to say nothing of audiences in France, who would have been even further removed from the villagers than the film's subjects). Rouch's sensitivity to other cultures in his cinematic approach predates the popularity of academic critiques of Orientalism by several decades, and can be seen as a rebuke of European chauvinism and racism, as well as a demonstration of the means by which indigenous people can reclaim their narratives.

== Reception and legacy ==
The film premiered on September 3, 1967, at the Venice Film Festival. On its general release, Jaguar was well received by audiences and critics in France. Rouch's approach to the subject material was praised as a humanistic and lyrical response to the frequently dehumanizing nature of ethnographic sciences.

Rouch commented that Jaguar did a better job documenting the phenomena of seasonal migration in Niger than his actual scientific monographs on the subject.
