= Cocorico! Monsieur Poulet =

- Directed by: Jean Rouch; Damouré Zika; Lam Ibrahim Dia
- Written by: Jean Rouch
- Starring: Damouré Zika; Lam Ibrahim Dia; Tallou Mouzourane
- Cinematography: Jean Rouch
- Edited by: Christine Lefort
- Production companies: Institut de Recherches en Sciences Humaines; Les Films de l'Homme
- Distributed by: Étoile Distribution
- Release date: January 19, 1977
- Running time: 93 minutes
- Country: Niger
- Languages: French; Fula; Hausa

Cocorico! Monsieur Poulet (French pronunciation: [kokoʁiko məsjø pulɛ]; "Cock-a-doodle-do! Mister Chicken") is a 1977 Franco-Nigerien road movie by "Dalarou", a pseudonym for Damouré Zika, Lam Ibrahim Dia and Jean Rouch.

== Production ==
Cocorico! Monsieur Poulet was filmed in and around Niamey, Niger on 16 mm film in 1974. Much of the film was improvised. Damouré Zika used the money he made from Petit à petit (1970) to buy the Citroën 2CV featured in the film.

== Synopsis ==
Lam, owner of a home-built Citroën 2CV named “Patience”, and his apprentice Tallou, drive into the countryside to buy chickens to sell in Niamey. Damouré, an opportunist, joins them on this one-day trip. They encounter adversity, a "demon", and are forced to make multiple crossings of the Niger River.

== Reception ==
Rembert Hüser wrote that in Cocorico! Monsieur Poulet "the technology fetish of Western society gets thoroughly dismantled."
