= Garankedey =

Coordinates: 13°17′11″N 3°06′07″E

Garankedey Garankédey, Garankadèye
- Commune and village
- Interactive map of Garankedey
- Country: Niger
- Region: Dosso
- Department: Dosso

Area
  - Total: 258.7 sq mi (670.0 km^{2})

Population (2012 census)
  - Total: 35,009
  - Density: 135.3/sq mi (52.25/km^{2})
- Time zone: UTC+1 (WAT)

Garankedey is a village and rural commune in Niger. As of 2012, it had a population of 35,009.
