= Tessa, Niger =

Coordinates: 12°46′18″N 3°24′41″E

- Commune and village
- Interactive map of Tessa, Niger
- Country: Niger
- Region: Dosso
- Department: Dosso

Population (2010)
  - Total: 26,398
- Time zone: UTC+1 (WAT)

Tessa, Niger is a village and rural commune in Niger.
