= Goroubankassam =

Coordinates: 13°06′16″N 3°27′56″E

Goroubankassam Gorouban Kassam, Gorou Bankassam
- Commune and village
- Interactive map of Goroubankassam
- Country: Niger
- Region: Dosso
- Department: Dosso

Area
  - Total: 205.6 sq mi (532.6 km^{2})

Population (2012 census)
  - Total: 33,125
  - Density: 161.1/sq mi (62.19/km^{2})
- Time zone: UTC+1 (WAT)

Goroubankassam is a village and rural commune in Niger.
