= Jean Rouch =

French filmmaker and anthropologist (1917–2004)

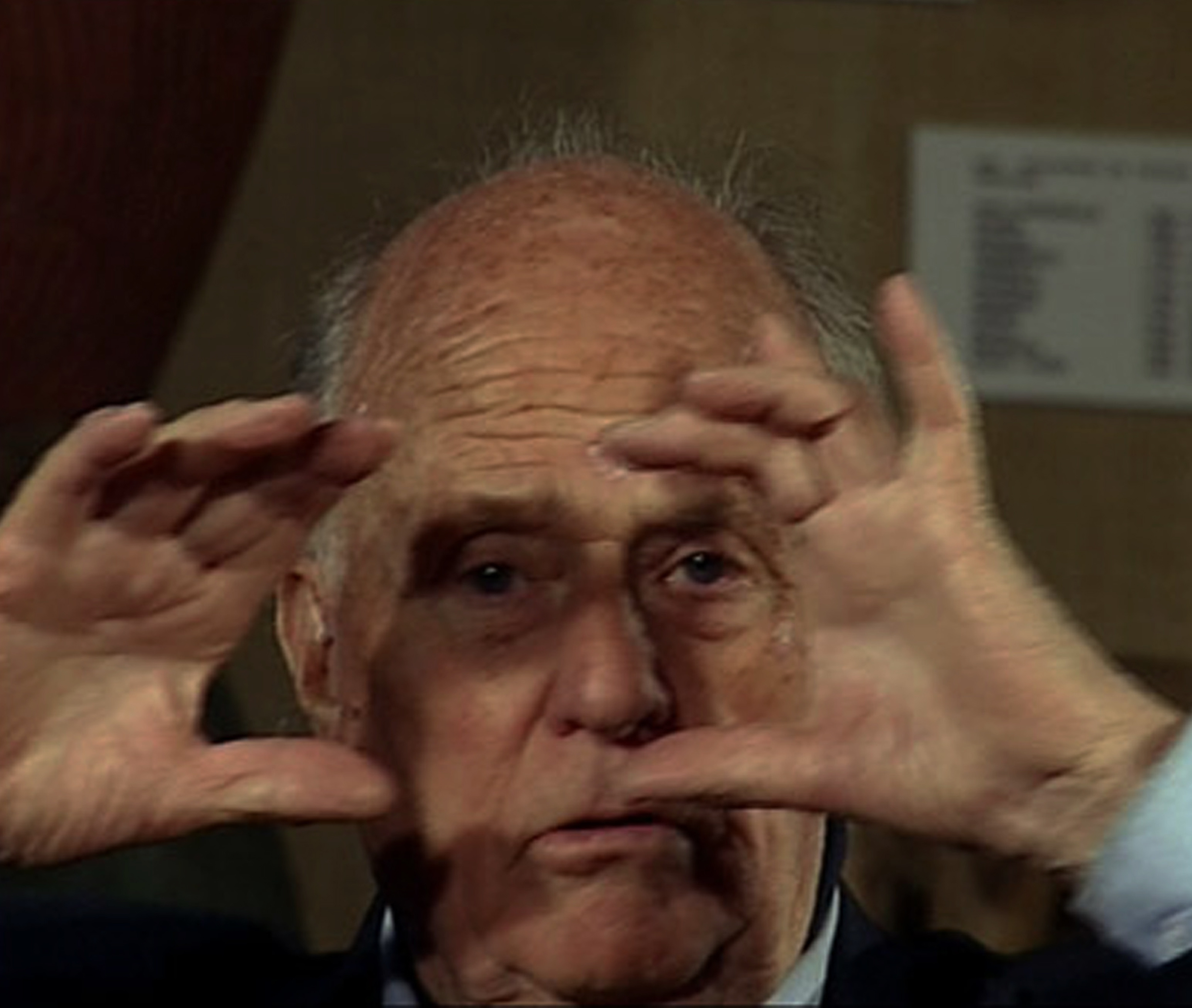
- Born: 31 May 1917; Paris, France
- Died: 18 February 2004 (aged 86); Birni-N'Konni, Niger
- Occupations: Filmmaker, anthropologist
- Years active: 1947–2002
- Notable work: Moi, un noir (I, a Black), Chronique d'un été (Chronicle of a Summer), La Chasse au lion à l'arc (Hunting the Lion with Bow and Arrow), Petit à petit (Little by Little)
- Relatives: Geneviève Rouch (sister)

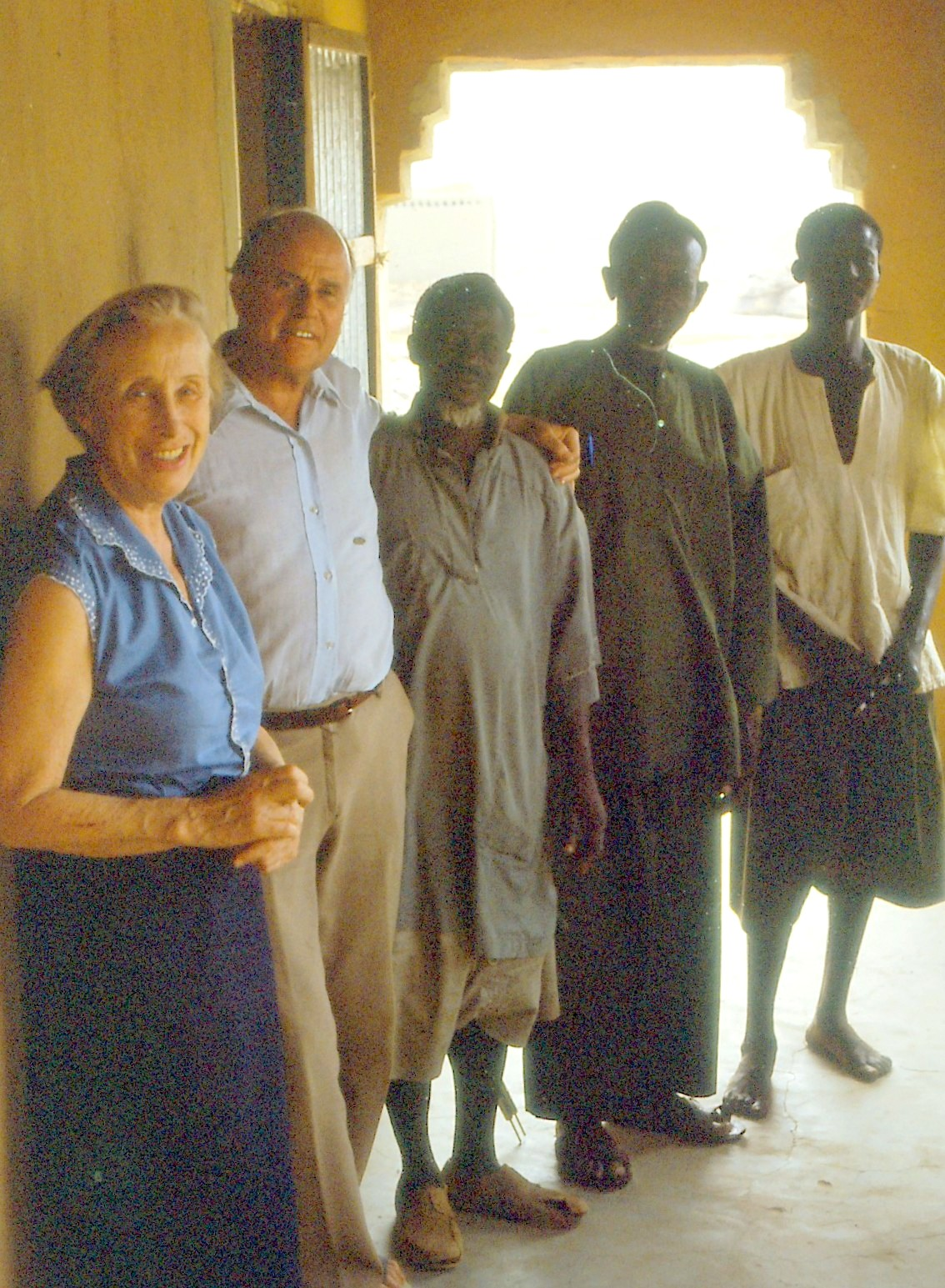
The French anthropologists Germaine Dieterlen (1903–1999) and Jean Rouch (1917–2004) with three of their local male informants, Sangha, Mali, 1980.

Jean Rouch (French: [ʁuʃ]; 31 May 1917 – 18 February 2004) was a French filmmaker and anthropologist.

He is considered one of the founders of cinéma vérité in France. Rouch's practice as a filmmaker, for over 60 years in Africa, was characterized by the idea of shared anthropology. Influenced by his discovery of surrealism in his early twenties, many of his films blur the line between fiction and documentary, creating a new style: ethnofiction. The French New Wave filmmakers hailed Rouch as one of their own.

Commenting on Rouch's work as someone "in charge of research for the Musée de l'Homme" in Paris, Godard said, “Is there a better definition for a filmmaker?".

== Career ==
Rouch began his long association with Nigerien subjects in 1941, when he arrived in Niamey as a French colonial hydrology engineer to supervise a construction project in Niger. There he met Damouré Zika, the son of a Songhai traditional healer and fisherman, near the town of Ayorou, on the Niger River. After ten Sorko workers were killed by lightning at a construction depot Rouch supervised, Zika's grandmother, a famous possession medium and spiritual advisor, presided over a ritual for men, which Rouch later claimed sparked his desire to make ethnographic film. He became interested in Zarma and Songhai ethnology, filming Songhai rituals and ceremonies. Rouch sent his work to his teacher Marcel Griaule, who encouraged him to continue it.

Shortly afterward, Rouch returned to France to participate in the Resistance. After the war, he did a brief stint as a journalist with Agence France-Presse before returning to Africa, where he became an influential anthropologist and sometimes controversial filmmaker.

Zika and Rouch became friends. In 1950, Rouch started to use Zika as the central character of his films, registering the traditions, culture, and ecology of the people of the Niger River valley. The first film in which Zika appeared was Bataille sur le grand fleuve (1950–52), portraying the life, ceremonies and hunting of Sorko fishermen. Rouch spent four months travelling with Sorko fishermen in a traditional pirogue.

His early films, such as Hippopotamus Hunt (Chasse à l'Hippopotame, 1946), Cliff Cemetery (Cimetière dans la Falaise, 1951), and The Rain Makers (Les Hommes qui Font la Pluie, 1951), were traditional, narrated reports, but he gradually became more innovative.

Rouch made his first films in Niger: Au pays des mages noirs (1947), Initiation à la danse des possédés (1948) and Les magicians de Wanzarbé (1949), all of which documented Songhai spirit possession rituals and the Zarma and Sorko peoples living along the Niger River. He is generally considered the father of Nigerien cinema. Despite arriving as a colonialist in 1941, Rouch remained in Niger after independence and mentored a generation of Nigerien filmmakers and actors, including Zika.

During the 1950s, Rouch began to produce longer ethnographic films. In 1954 he cast Zika in Jaguar as a young Songhai man traveling for work to the Gold Coast. Three men dramatized their real-life roles in the film, and became the first three actors of Nigerien cinema. Zika helped reedit the film, originally a silent ethnographic piece, into a feature-length movie somewhere between documentary and fiction (docufiction), and provided dialogue and commentary for a 1969 release. In 1957, Rouch directed Moi, un noir in Côte d'Ivoire with the young Nigerien filmmaker Oumarou Ganda, who had recently returned from French military service in Indochina. Ganda became the first great Nigerien film director and actor. By the early 1970s, Rouch, with cast, crew, and co-writing from his Nigerien collaborators, was producing full-length dramatic films in Niger, such as Petit à petit (Little by Little : 1971) and Cocorico Monsieur Poulet ("Cocka-doodle-doo Mr. Chicken": 1974).

Many African filmmakers rejected Rouch's and others' ethnographic films produced in the colonial era for distorting reality. Rouch is considered a pioneer of Nouvelle Vague and visual anthropology, and the father of ethnofiction. His films are mostly cinéma vérité, a term Edgar Morin used in a 1960 France-Observateur article referring to the Kino-Pravda newsreels of Dziga Vertov. Rouch's best-known film, one of the central works of the Nouvelle Vague, is Chronique d'un été (1961), which he filmed with sociologist Edgar Morin and portrays the social life of contemporary France. Throughout his career, he reported on life in Africa. Over the course of five decades, he made almost 120 films.

Rouch and Jean-Michel Arnold founded an international documentary film festival, the Cinéma du Réel, at the Pompidou Centre in Paris in 1978.

In 1996, following the election of Nelson Mandela, Rouch visited the Centre for Rhetoric Studies at the University of Cape Town at Philippe-Joseph Salazar's invitation. He gave two lectures on his work and shot some footage in the Black townships with his assistant Rita Sherman.

Rouch died in a car accident in February 2004, 16 kilometres from Birni-N'Konni, Niger.

In her 2017 essay "How the Art World, and Art Schools, Are Ripe for Sexual Abuse", contemporary artist Coco Fusco details an early encounter with Rouch: "I was sexually accosted by the renowned ethnographic filmmaker Jean Rouch, who is credited with having invented a better way to look at Africans."

== Main films ==
- 1947: Au pays des mages noirs (In the Land of the Black Magi)
- 1949: Initiation à la danse des possédés (Initiation into Possession Dance)
- 1949: La Circoncision (The Circumcision)
- 1950: Cimetière dans la falaise
- 1951: Bataille sur le grand fleuve (Battle on the Great River)
- 1953: Les Fils de l'eau
- 1954: Mammy Water
- 1954: Les maîtres fous (The Mad Masters)
- 1957: Baby Ghana
- 1958: Moi, un noir (Treichville) [I, a Black (Treichville)]
- 1961: La pyramide humaine (The Human Pyramid)
- 1961: Chronique d'un été (Paris 1960) (Chronicle of a Summer) — co-directed with Edgar Morin
- 1964: La punition, ou les Mauvaises rencontres [Punishment, or: Bad Encounters]
- 1964: Gare du Nord (segment of Paris vu par — aka: Six in Paris)
- 1965: La chasse au lion à l'arc [Lion Hunting with Bow and Arrow] (aka The Lion Hunters)
- 1966: Sigui année zero
- 1966: Les veuves de 15 ans (The 15-Year-Old Widows)
- 1967: Sigui: l'enclume de Yougo
- 1967: Jaguar
- 1968: Sigui 1968: Les danseurs de Tyogou
- 1969: Sigui 1969: La caverne de Bongo
- 1969: Petit à Petit [the title translates in English to "Little by Little"; in the film "Petit à Petit" is the name of an import-export company in Niamey, Niger]
- 1970: Sigui 1970: Les clameurs d'Amani
- 1971: Sigui 1971: La dune d'Idyeli
- 1971: Tourou et Bitti, les tambours d'avant (Tourou and Bitti: The Drums of the Past)
- 1972: Sigui 1972: Les pagnes de lame
- 1973: Sigui 1973: L'auvent de la circonsion
- 1974: Cocorico! Monsieur Poulet
- 1976: Babatu
- 1977: Ciné-portrait de Margaret Mead
- 1977: Makwayela (1977)
- 1979: Les funérailles à Bougo, le vieil Anaï
- 1980: "Funeral at Bongo: Old Anaï (1848-72) [version with English language narration by Rouch]
- 1984: Dionysos
- 1986: " Folie Ordinaire d'une fille de Cham " co-directed with Philippe Constantini avec Jenny Alpha et Sylvie Laporte
- 1990: Liberté, égalité, fraternité et puis après (Freedom, Equality, Fraternity—And Then What?)
- 2002: Le rêve plus fort que la mort co-directed with Bernard Surugue

== Bibliography ==
- Rouch, Jean. Ciné-Ethnography, edited and translated by Steven Feld. University of Minnesota Press, 2003.
- Rouch, Jean. La Religion et la Magie Songhay. Presses Universitaires de France, 1960. 2nd revised edition published by Éditions de l'Université de Bruxelles, 1989.
