= Bioreclamation of degraded lands =

Large swathes of the Sahel region, which were once covered by grasslands, savannah, woodlands and scrub, suffer from land degradation. Soils have become degraded in locations where farmers have cleared perennial vegetation to grow crops and graze animals, exposing the soil to erosion by wind and water. In total, one-third of the world's population lives in drylands where land degradation is reducing food supplies, biodiversity, water quality and soil fertility.

The bioreclamation of degraded lands (BDL) system was developed by the International Crops Research Institute for the Semi-Arid Tropics (ICRISAT), with the aim of helping reverse damage to soils caused by overgrazing and intensive farming. Laterite soils have a high clay content, which means they have higher cation exchange capacity and water-holding capacity than sandy soils. However, when they become degraded, a hard crust can form on the surface, which hinders water infiltration and the emergence of seedlings. The BDL system involves using indigenous water-harvesting methods (such as planting pits and trenches), applying animal and plant residues, and planting high-value fruit trees and indigenous vegetable crops that can tolerate drought conditions.

ICRISAT has employed this system to rehabilitate degraded laterite soils in Niger and increase smallholder farmers' incomes at the same time. Trials have demonstrated that a 200 m^{2} plot can yield an income of around US$100, which is what men traditionally earn from millet production per hectare (10,000 m^{2}) in the country. Niger's rural women are often marginalised and tend to only be given land once it has become degraded. Using the BDL system has therefore also helped to improve livelihoods for women in Niger.
