= Seasonal human migration =

Seasonal human migration that occurs cyclically in the course of the year

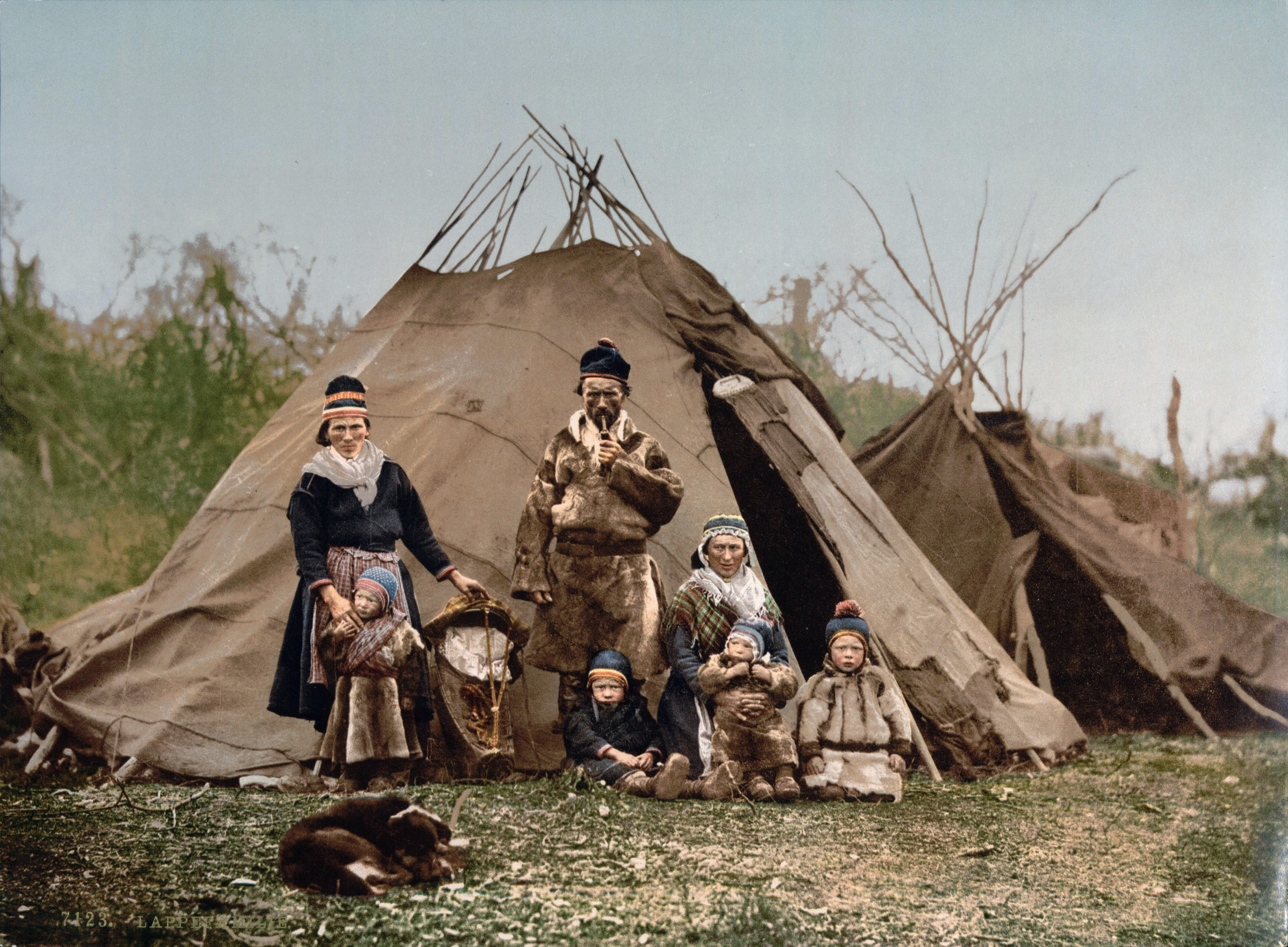
A Sami family in 1896

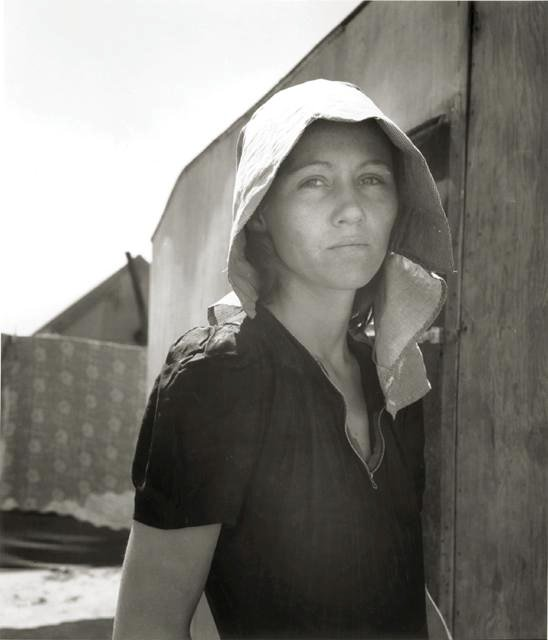
American female migratory worker in 1940.

Seasonal human migration is the movement of people from one place or another on a seasonal basis. It occurs most commonly due to seasonal shifts in demand for labor. It includes migrations such as moving sheep or cattle to higher elevations during summer to escape the heat and find more forage. Human labor often moves with fruit harvest or to other crops that require manual picking.

== Seasonal agricultural migration ==
While the culture of many crops (especially "dry" crops) has become entirely mechanized, others, such as fruits and vegetables, still require manual labor, at least for harvest, and some, such as tobacco, still need manual labor for its culture. Much of the work was once provided by family members or boarding students, but they are less available now, and farms are larger. Now, migrant workers provide much of the hand labor required in agriculture in the US and other countries. Labor contractors arrange with farmers to provide the necessary help at the seasonal time, often with foreign nationals whose employment opportunities are more limited in their home areas.

A number of migratory contractors, known as "custom harvesters", move with their combines to follow the wheat harvest in the United States and Canada. as the season moves north. Some crop dusters are also migratory, following seasonal patterns of need. In the large citrus districts of Florida and California seasonal pickers arrive for collection periods and often move with the changing harvest.

Most commercial beekeepers in the US are migratory, spending winter in warm climates and moving with the spring to follow the bloom, or pollination contracts for almonds, apples, blueberries and other fruits and vegetables that require bees. Migratory beekeeping also is practiced, especially in France, Australia, South Africa and Argentina.

== Seasonal non-agricultural migration ==
Other activities besides agriculture depend on weather. Thus circuses in the United States formerly spent the winter in warm climates and worked their way north in spring and south in autumn. Boomer linemen similarly served the telephone industry, repairing winter storm damage.

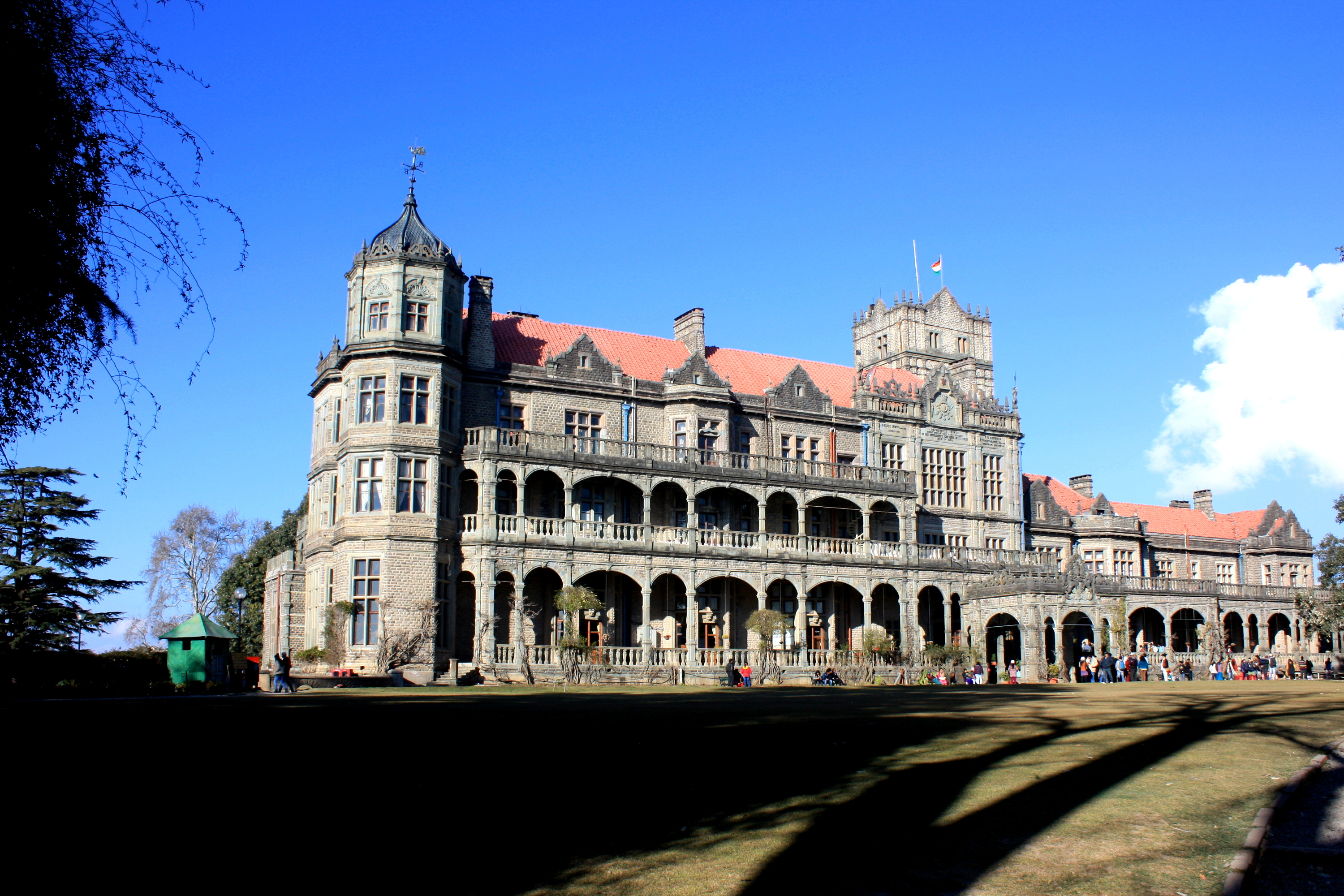
The Vice-regal Lodge (Rashtrapati Niwas), Simla

Some researchers suggest that snowbirds, Canadian and US citizens who move to warmer climates during the winter, exhibit patterns of seasonal migration. Although they are moving for non-agricultural reasons, they move with the seasons. For example, many residents of Ontario, Canada move to Florida, US during the winter. The practice actually dates back to colonial times, when Bostonians of means would often go (by sea) to Charleston or Savannah for winter. Later, the wealthy in the growing country maintained several seasonal residences and shifted residence with the seasons, to avail themselves of the best time to be at each location, and they named their time there "the season". In British India, Ceylon and Malaya, the cooler hill stations became the place of residence for Europeans during the hot summers, and Simla became the summer capital of the British Raj.

== See also ==
- Transhumance
- Nomad
- Seasonal migration in Niger
