= Tombokoirey I =

Coordinates: 11°55′53″N 3°18′00″E

- Commune
- Interactive map of Tombokoirey I
- Country: Niger
- Region: Dosso
- Department: Dosso

Population (2010)
  - Total: 30,385
- Time zone: UTC+1 (WAT)

Tombokoirey I is a rural commune in Niger.
