= Tombokoirey II =

Coordinates: 13°16′15″N 3°41′33″E

- Commune
- Interactive map of Tombokoirey II
- Country: Niger
- Region: Dosso
- Department: Dosso

Population (2010)
  - Total: 54,373
- Time zone: UTC+1 (WAT)

Tombokoirey II is a rural commune in Niger.
