= Chronicle of a Summer =

- Chronique d'un été
- Directed by: Jean Rouch and Edgar Morin
- Produced by: Anatole Dauman
- Narrated by: Jean Rouch
- Cinematography: Michel Brault; Raoul Coutard; Roger Morillière; Jean-Jacques Tarbès
- Edited by: Néna Baratier; Françoise Collin; Jean Ravel
- Music by: Pierre Barbaud
- Release date: October 1961; (France)
- Running time: 90 minutes
- Country: France
- Language: French

Chronicle of a Summer (French original title: Chronique d'un été) is a 1961 French documentary film shot during the summer of 1960 by sociologist Edgar Morin and anthropologist and filmmaker Jean Rouch, with the technical and aesthetic collaboration of Québécois director-cameraman Michel Brault.

The film is widely regarded as structurally innovative and an example of cinéma vérité and direct cinema. The term "cinéma vérité" was suggested by the film's publicist and coined by Rouch, highlighting a connection between film and its context, otherwise referred to as reflexive documentary. Brault confirmed this in an interview after a 2011 screening of Chronique d'un été at the TIFF Bell Lightbox in Toronto.

The film was screened at the 1961 Cannes Film Festival where it won the FIPRESCI International Critics' Prize. In a 2014 Sight & Sound poll, film critics voted Chronicle of a Summer the sixth-best documentary film of all time.

== Synopsis ==
The film begins with Rouch and Morin discussing whether it is possible to act sincerely on camera. A cast of real-life individuals are then introduced and led by the filmmakers to discuss topics related to French society and working-class happiness. At the movie's end, the filmmakers show their subjects the footage and have them discuss the level of reality that they thought the movie achieved.

== Production ==
Chronicle of a Summer was filmed in Paris and Saint-Tropez, France. Rouch used synchronized sound, using a 16 mm camera connected through pilottone with a prototype of Nagra III, a transistorized tape recorder with electronic speed control developed by Stefan Kudelski.

== Cast ==
All cast members appear as themselves.

- Jean Rouch
- Edgar Morin
- Marceline Loridan-Ivens
- Marilù Parolini (as Mary Lou)
- Angelo
- Jean-Pierre Sergent
- Jean (worker)
- Jacques Gautrat (worker)
- Nadine Ballot (student)
- Régis Debray (student)
- Céline (student)
- Jean-Marc (student)
- Modeste Landry (student)
- Raymond (student)
- Jacques (office workers)
- Simone (office workers)
- Henri (artist)
- Madi (artist)
- Catherine (artist)
- Sophie (One cover girl)
- Véro (young girl, uncredited)
- Maxie (Jacques' wife, uncredited)
- Jacques Rivette (cameo, scene deleted)
