= Damouré Zika =

Nigerien traditional healer, broadcaster and actor (c. 1923 – 2009)

- Born: c 1923
- Died: 6 April 2009
- Citizenship: Niger
- Occupations: traditional healer, broadcaster, and film actor
- Notable work: Jaguar

Damouré Zika (c. 1923 – 6 April 2009) was a Nigerien traditional healer, broadcaster, and film actor. Coming from a long line of traditional healers in the Sorko ethnic group of western Niger, Zika appeared in many of the films of French director Jean Rouch, becoming one of Niger's first actors. As a practitioner of traditional medicine, he opened a clinic in Niamey, and was for many years a broadcaster and commentator on health issues for Niger's national radio.

== Early life ==
Zika was the son of a Zarma speaking traditional healer and fisherman, near the town of Ayorou on the Niger River. It was there, in the 1940s, that he began working with the French ethnographer and filmmaker Jean Rouch, who was then working as a French colonial hydrology engineer. Zika came from a long line of Sorko healers and spirit mediums. He met Rouch after ten Sorko workers in a construction depot which Rouch supervised were killed by a lightning strike. Zika's grandmother, a famous possession medium and spiritual advisor, presided over a ritual for the men, which Rouch later claimed sparked his desire to make enthographic film.

The two became friends, and Rouch began in 1950 to use Zika as the focus of his films demonstration the traditions, culture, and ecology of the people of the Niger River valley. The first of 150 in which Zika appeared was "Bataille sur le grand fleuve" (1950-52), portraying the lives, ceremonies and hunting of Sorko fishermen.

== Films ==
By the late 1950s, these films became longer and more narrative. "Jaguar" (filmed 1954-1955) stars Zika as a Songhai noble traveling for work to the Gold Coast. Filmed a silent ethnographic piece, Zika helped re-edit the film into a feature-length movie, and provided dialog and commentary for a 1967 release. By that time Rouch was producing long narrative films, many of which Zika appeared in, becoming one of Nigerien cinema's first recognizable actors. Zika was among those injured in the 2004 car accident near N'guigmi in which Rouch died.

== Healthcare and broadcasting ==
Continuing his study of traditional medicine, Zika became a licensed practitioner and began a long career as a broadcaster, hosting a fortnightly show on Niger's state run Radio Voix du Sahel. Zika used his fame to finance a clinic in Lamordé, a district on the right bank of the Niger in Niamey. There he provided free care for the indigent for many decades. Zika died in Niamey after a long illness on 6 April 2009, with his age reported as somewhere between 85 and 86. He is survived by four wives, 35 children and 80 grandchildren.

== Notable films ==
- Jaguar (filmed 1954-55, released 1967): Actor, editor, sound
- Petit à petit "Little by Little" (1971): Actor
- Cocorico! Monsieur Poulet "Cocka-doodle-doo Mr. Chicken" (1974): Actor
- Babatu (1976)
