= Dosso Department =

Coordinates: 13°02′56″N 3°11′37″E

Dosso
- Department
- Dosso Department location in the region (pre 2011 borders)
- Country: Niger
- Region: Dosso Region

Area
  - Total: 3,451 sq mi (8,938 km^{2})

Population (2012 census)
  - Total: 492,560
- Time zone: UTC+1 (GMT 1)

Dosso is a department of the Dosso Region in Niger. Its capital lies at the city of Dosso. As of 2012, the department had a total population of 492,560 people.

== Communes ==
=== Urban ===
- Dosso

=== Rural ===
- Farey
- Garankédey
- Gollé
- Goroubankassam
- Karguibangou
- Mokko
- Sambéra
- Tessa
- Tombokoirey I
- Tombokoirey II
