= Dosso, Niger =

Dosso
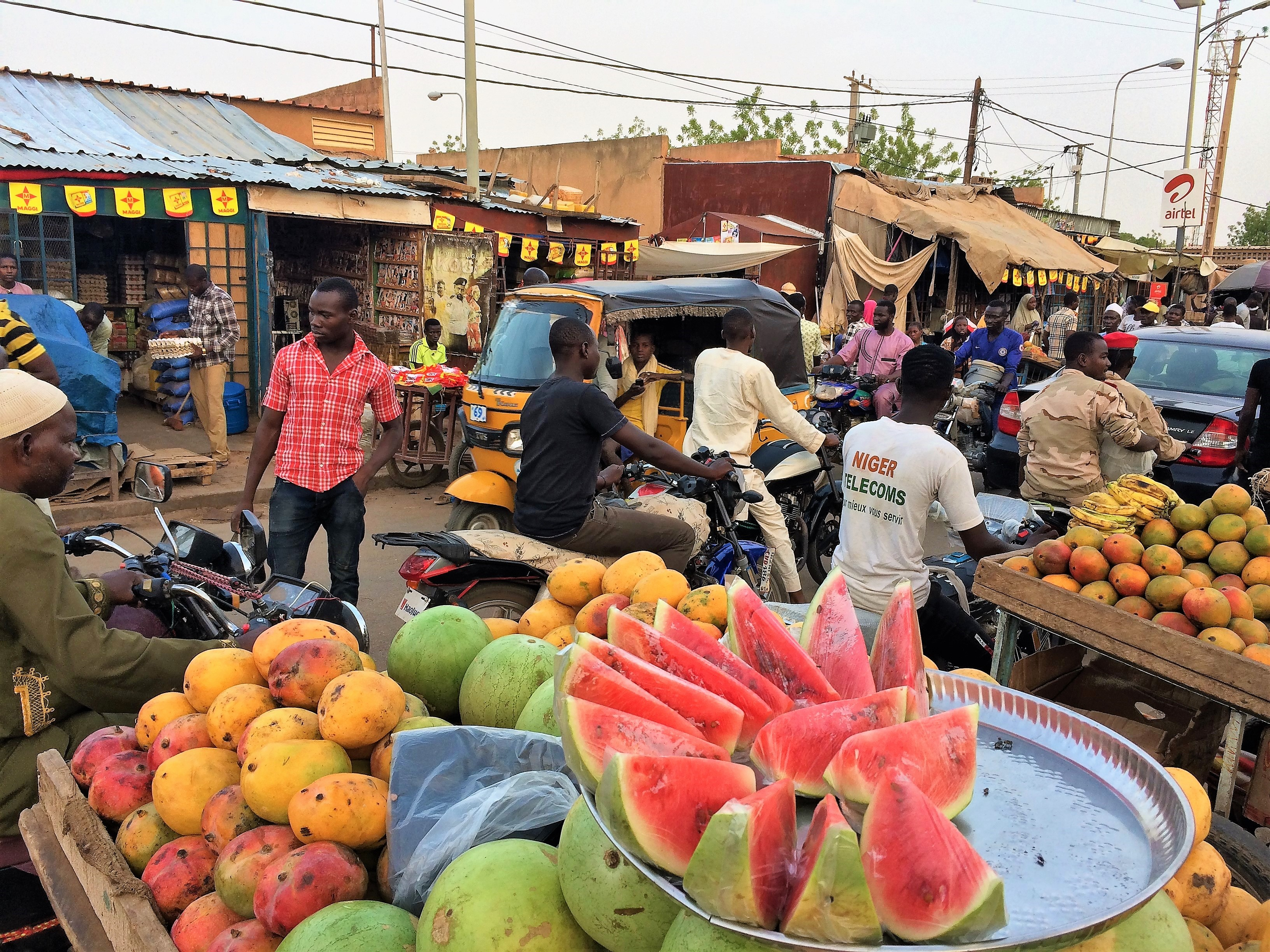
- Street market in Dosso

- Location in Niger
- Coordinates: 13°02′40″N 3°11′41″E
- Country: Niger
- Region: Dosso Region
- Department: Dosso Department
- Urban Commune: Dosso
- Elevation: 227 m (745 ft)

Population (2012)
  - Total: 58,671
  - Summer (DST): UTC+1 (WAT)

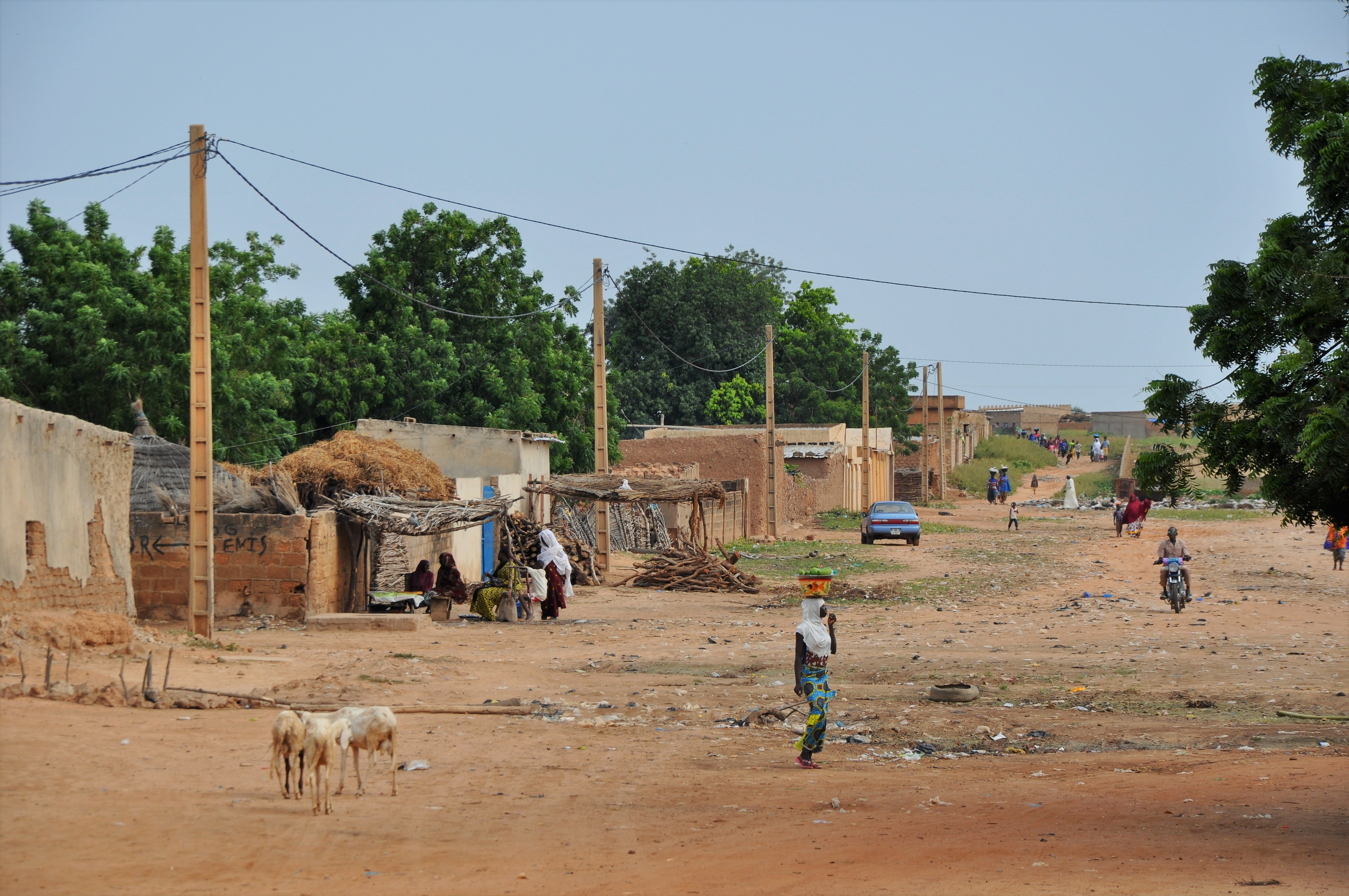
Street in an average residential neighborhood

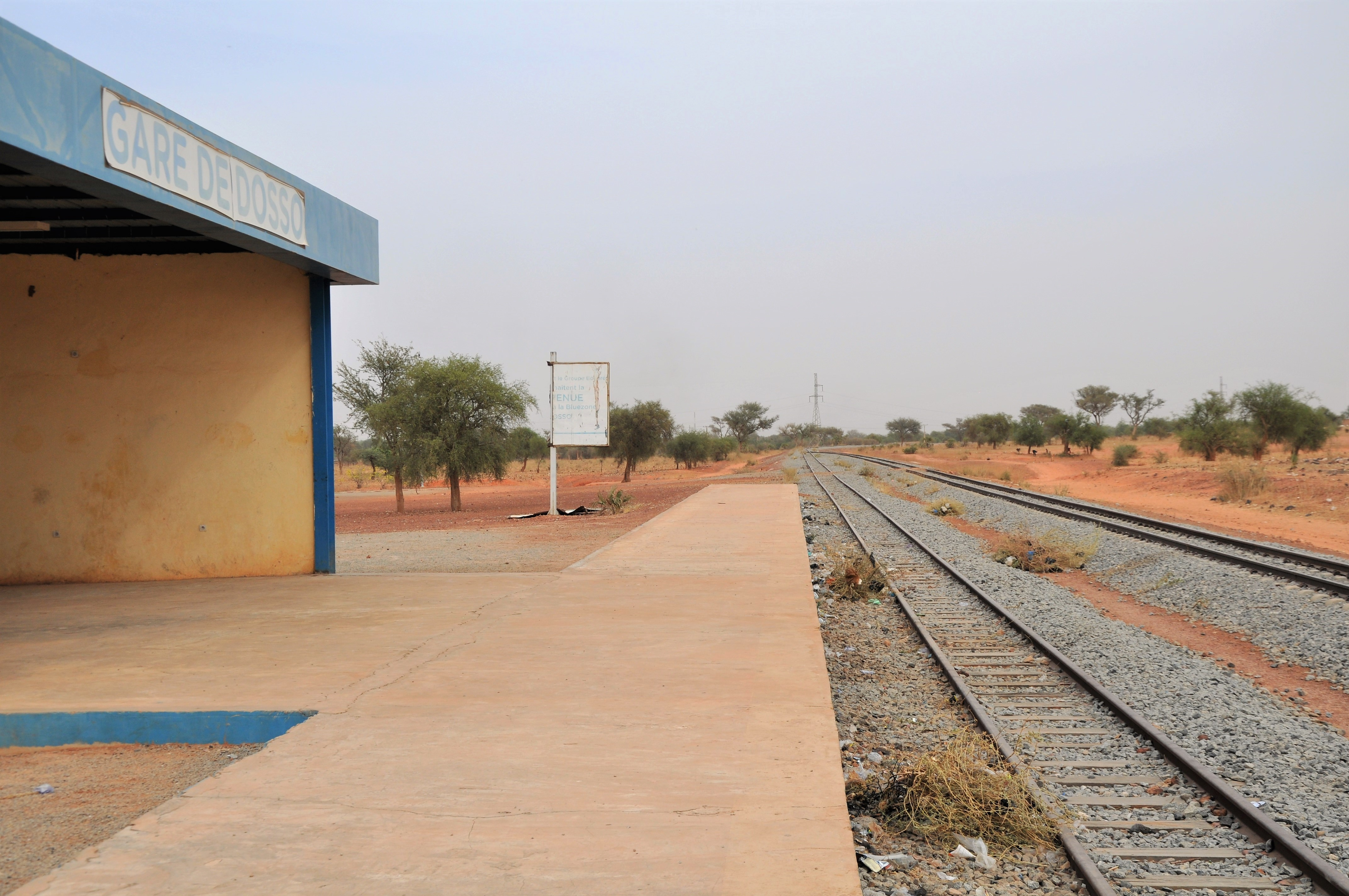
Dosso railway station, never used.

Dosso is a city in the south-west corner of Niger, lying approximately 130–140 kilometres (81–87 mi) south-east of the capital Niamey at the junction of the main routes to Zinder and Benin. The eighth-most populous town in Niger and the largest in Dosso Region, it had an official population during the 2001 census of 43,561. The population grew to 58,671 in the 2012 census. It is the capital of its region - which covers five departments in the southwestern corner of the nation - as well as of its own department, Dosso Department. The city itself lies at the centre of its own Urban Commune.

== History ==
Dosso is the seat of the Dosso kingdom, a Zarma chieftaincy which rose to dominate the entire Zarma region in Niger in pre-colonial Niger. The traditional ruler is called Zarmakoy or Djermakoy of Dosso, an autochthonous title meaning literally "King of Djermas" where koy means "king" in Zarma (or Djerma) language.

== Sites ==
Attractions in the town include the Djermakoy's palace and museum, nominated as a UNESCO World Heritage Site in 2006.

== Transport ==
Road: The city of Dosso is a commercial hub for trade between Niamey and the towns of eastern Niger, as well as Benin.
Rail: between 2014 and 2016, a rail link was built between Dosso and Niamey by the French Bolloré conglomerate. The objective was to connect Niamey to the rail network in Benin and thus to the coast. But competing commercial interests by several parties resulted in endless litigation and the connection to Benin never materialized. So the 145 km Niamey-Dosso stretch now lies orphaned and unused, with the tracks ending in the middle of nowhere some 6 km south of Dosso. After 5 years of neglect the tracks are already damaged to such an extent in some places, that they have become unusable.
Customs: There is a plan for the construction of a dry commercial port.
Air: Dosso has a small airport with a single non-tarmacked airstrip. The runway has a length of 1,189 m (3,901 ft). Its ICAO code is DRRD. There are no regular flights.

== Climatic Condition ==
There is a hot dry season in Dosso, and there is a wet season as well. The dry season is characterised by somewhat cloudy skies.

== Notable residents ==
- Rabiou Guero Gao – Olympic middle-distance runner for Niger
- Zakari Gourouza – first Nigerien Olympic judoka

== Sources ==
- James Decalo. Historical Dictionary of Niger. Scarecrow Press, Metuchen. NJ – London (1979) ISBN 0-8108-1229-0
