= Droughts in the Sahel =

Historical droughts occurring in the Sahel region

More than a century of rainfall data in the Sahel show an unusually wet period from 1950 until 1970 (positive index values), followed by extremely dry years from 1970 to 1991. (negative index values). From 1990 until present rainfall returned to levels slightly below the 1898–1993 average, but year-to-year variability was high.

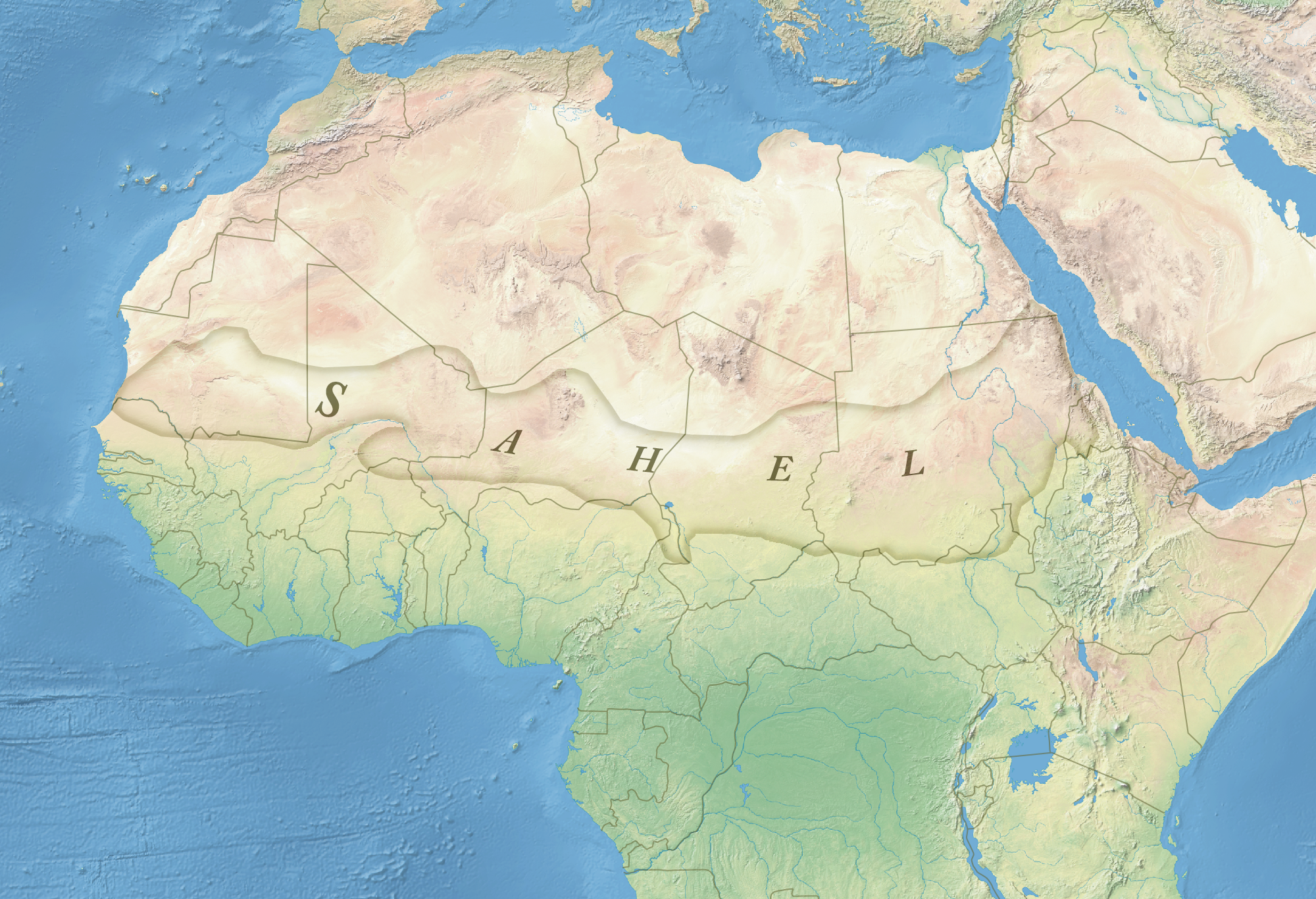
A map of the extent of the Sahel

The Sahel region of Africa has long experienced a series of historic droughts, dating back to at least the 17th century. The Sahel region is a climate zone sandwiched between the Sudanian Savanna to the south and the Sahara desert to the north, across West and Central Africa. While the frequency of drought in the region is thought to have increased from the end of the 19th century, three long droughts have had dramatic environmental and societal effects upon the Sahel nations. Famine followed severe droughts in the 1910s, the 1940s, and the 1960s, 1970s and 1980s, although a partial recovery occurred from 1975 to 1980. The most recent drought occurred in 2012.

While at least one particularly severe drought has been confirmed each century since the 17th century, the frequency and severity of recent Sahelian droughts stands out. Famine and dislocation on a massive scale—from 1968 to 1974 and again in the early and mid-1980s—was blamed on two spikes in the severity of the 1960-1980s drought period. From the late 1960s to early 1980s famine killed 100,000 people, left 750,000 dependent on food aid, and affected most of the Sahel's 50 million people. The economies, agriculture, livestock and human populations of much of Mauritania, Mali, Chad, Niger and Burkina Faso (known as Upper Volta during the time of the drought) were severely impacted. As disruptive as the droughts of the late 20th century were, evidence of past droughts recorded in Ghanaian lake sediments suggest that multi-decadal megadroughts were common in West Africa over the past 3,000 years and that several droughts lasted far longer and were far more severe.

Since the 1980s, summer rainfall in the Sahel has been increasing; this has been associated with an increase in vegetation, forming what has been called a 'greening' of the Sahel. The observed increase in rainfall is accounted for by enhancements in the African easterly jet, which is known to induce wet anomalies. A 2011 study found that the positional shifts in the African easterly jet and African easterly waves accompanied the northward migration of the Sahel rainband.

== History ==
Because the Sahel's rainfall is heavily concentrated in a very small period of the year, the region has been prone to dislocation when droughts have occurred ever since agriculture developed around 5,000 years ago. The Sahel is marked by rainfalls of less than 1,000 millimetres or 40 inches a year, almost all of which occurs in one continuous season, which can run from several weeks to four months.

Despite this vulnerability, the history of drought and famine in the Sahel do not perfectly correlate. While modern scientific climate and rainfall studies have been able to identify trends and even specific periods of drought in the region, oral and written records over the last millennium do not record famine in all places at all times of drought. One 1997 study, in attempting to map long scale rainfall records to historical accounts of famine in Northern Nigeria, concluded that "the most disruptive historical famines occurred when the cumulative deficit of rainfall fell below 1.3 times the standard deviation of long-term mean annual rainfall for a particular place." The 1982 to 1984 period, for instance, was particularly destructive to the pastoral Fula people of Senegal, Mali and Niger, and the Tuareg of northern Mali and Niger. The populations had not only suffered in the 1968 to 1974 period, but the inability of many to rebuild herds destroyed a decade earlier, along with factors as various as the shift of political power to settled populations with independence in the 1960s, Senegalese-Mauritanian border relations, and Niger's dependence upon falling world uranium prices coinciding in a destructive famine.

=== 600–700 AD ===
Surviving contemporary records of climate in the Sahel begin with early Muslim travellers in the early Medieval Warm Period. These suggest that Sahel rainfall was relatively low in the 7th and 8th centuries and then increased substantially from about 800 AD. There was a decline in rainfall from about 1300 AD, but an increase again around 200 years later.

=== "Little Ice Age" droughts ===
According to a study of West African drought based on Ghanaian lake sediments (not eyewitness historical accounts) published in the journal Science in April 2009:

The most recent of these [multicentury droughts] occurred between 1400 and 1750 CE (550 to 200 yr B.P.), similar in timing to the Little Ice Age (LIA, 1400 to 1850 CE), a well-known interval when Northern Hemisphere temperatures were cooler than at present. In contrast with earlier studies, which reconstructed wetter conditions in East Africa during this period, evidence from Lake Bosumtwi supports more recent studies suggesting that this interval was dry. Evidence for LIA drought is not restricted to Africa, however. Records from throughout the tropics, including the western Pacific warm pool, the Arabian Sea, continental Asia, and tropical South America all show evidence for dry conditions during this time period.

==== 1640 ====
The first major historically recorded drought in the Sahel occurred around 1640. Based on the reports of European travellers, a major drought after generally wet conditions also took place during the 1680s.

==== 1740s and 1750s ====
Cycles of several wet decades followed by a drought were to be repeated during the 18th century. Sahelian drought again killed hundreds of thousands of people in the 1740s and 1750s. The 1740s and 1750s was recorded in chronicles of what is today Northern Nigeria, Niger and Mali as the "Great Famine", the worst for at least 200 years prior. It caused massive dislocation of the Sahelian states of the time, but also disrupted the Trans Saharan trade routes to North Africa and Europe.

==== 1830s ====
Around 1790 dry conditions similar to those of the late 20th century set in and continued until around 1870. After that, a very wet period set in for around 25 years, followed by a return to drier conditions. While the drying begun around 1895 and caused its first large famine only in the early 20th century, the 1820s and 1830s saw a 12 to 15-year drought and regional instances of major famine from Senegal to Chad. Historical records suggest this drought caused a large-scale emigration from the Bornu Empire, contributing to its rapid decline in the 19th century. In what is now northern Senegal, the Imamate of Futa Toro was struck by a famine caused by the failure of 1833's rainy season, leading to waves of famine until 1837.

=== Early 20th century droughts ===
The first rain gauges in the Sahel date from 1898 and they reveal that a major drought in the 1910s, accompanied by large-scale famine, was followed by wet conditions during the 1920s and 1930s, reaching a peak with the very wet year of 1936. The 1940s saw several minor droughts — notably in 1949 — but the 1950s were consistently wet, and expansion of agriculture to feed growing populations characterised this decade. Many have thought this contributed to the severity of the subsequent Sahel droughts.

=== Late 20th century droughts ===
Burkina Faso, northern Nigeria, southern Niger, far northern Cameroon (near Lake Chad) and central Chad all struggled with dwindling rain fall from the 1960s.

The 1968-73 drought severely affected several West African countries. Grazing became impossible and this triggered a large-scale famine that led to the first mobilization of external aid and the creation of the International Fund for Agricultural Development by United Nations. Up to 100,000 people and a third of livestock died. This drought was so catastrophic that it became known as the "Great Sahelian drought".

In 1983-84 Sahelian countries received some of the lowest rainfall ever recorded. However, even though this drought was more severe than that of the early 1970s, the human impact was less severe, since economies and societies had developed better coping mechanisms.

A literature review from the African Journal of Ecology summarized the environmental changes that species faced after the late 20th century droughts, some of which includes (but is not limited to) severe declines in biodiversity and increases in other disturbances, such as fires.

=== 21st Century Droughts ===
==== 2010 Sahel drought ====
Throughout June to August 2010, famine struck the Sahel. Niger's crops failed to mature in the heat which resulted in famine. 350,000 faced starvation and 1,200,000 were at risk of famine. In Chad, the temperature reached 47.6 °C (117.7 °F) on June 22 in Faya-Largeau, breaking a record set in 1961 at the same location. Niger tied its highest temperature record set in 1998, on also June 22, at 47.1 °C (116.8 °F) in Bilma. That record was broken the next day, on June 23 when Bilma hit 48.2 °C (118.8 °F). The hottest temperature recorded in Sudan was reached on June 25, at 49.6 °C (121.3 °F) in Dongola, breaking a record set in 1987. Niger reported diarrhoea, starvation, gastroenteritis, malnutrition and respiratory diseases killed and sickened many children July 14. The new military junta appealed for international food aid and has taken serious steps to calling overseas help since coming to office in February 2010. On July 26 the heat reached near-record levels over Chad and Niger.

==== 2012 Sahel drought ====
By the middle of 2010, another drought in the western Sahel was predicted by several organisations for 2011 and 2012.

== Potential contributing factors ==
Originally it was believed that the drought in the Sahel primarily was caused by humans over-using natural resources in the region through overgrazing, deforestation and poor land management. In the late 1990s, climate model studies suggested that large scale climate changes were also triggers for the drought.

Based on Senegal river cycles, precipitation cycles of various El Sahel stations which are related to Solar (89–120 years) Wolf-Gleissberg cycles, and on relations to Nile floods and Equatorial lake levels, Yousef and Ghilly in 2000 anticipated that there is a considerable probability that drought will occur El Sahel Zone in 2005±4 years. This forecast was correct as drought occurred in El Niger in 2005 and again in 2010.

In 2002, after the phenomenon of global dimming was discovered, a CSIRO study suggested that the drought was probably caused by air pollution generated in Eurasia and North America, which changed the properties of clouds over the Atlantic Ocean, disturbing the monsoons and shifting the tropical rains southwards.

In 2005, a series of climate modeling studies performed at NOAA / Geophysical Fluid Dynamics Laboratory indicated that the late 20th century Sahel drought was probably a climatic response to changing sea surface temperature patterns, and that it could be viewed as a combination of natural variability superimposed upon an anthropogenically forced regional drying trend. Using GFDL CM2.X, these climate model simulations indicated that the general late 20th century Sahel drying trend was attributable to human-induced factors; largely due to an increase in greenhouse gases and partly due to an increase in atmospheric aerosols. A study published in 2013, done at the University of Washington, suggests that atmospheric aerosols caused a downward shift in the Intertropical Convergence Zone. The shift, the study says, left normally rainy areas in Central Africa much drier. In IPCC future scenario A2 (CO_{2} value of ≈860 ppm) Sahel rainfall could be reduced by up to 25% by year 2100, according to climate models.

A 2006 study by NOAA scientists suggests that the Atlantic Multidecadal Oscillation plays a leading role. An AMO warm phase strengthens the summer rainfall over Sahel, while a cold phase reduces it. The AMO entered a warm phase in 1995 and, assuming a 70-year cycle (following peaks in ≈1880 and ≈1950), will peak around 2020. A 2009 study found further evidence for a link between the AMO and West African drought. Later, a 2013 study found that the East Atlantic (EA) mode also modulates Sahel summer rainfall and further indicated that operational climate forecasting was unable to capture this EA impact on the Sahel.

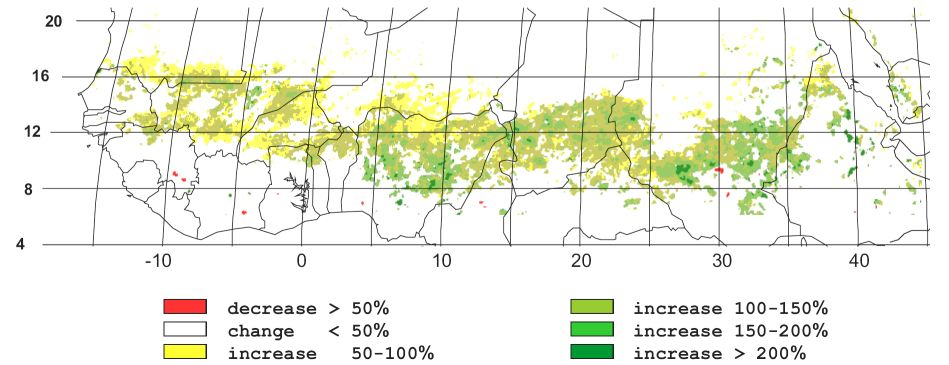
Recent "greening" of the Sahel: The results of trend analyses of time series over the Sahel region of seasonally integrated NDVI using NOAA AVHRR NDVI-data from 1982 to 1999. Areas with trends of <95% probability in white.

The recovery of Sahel drought since the 1990s, coined "Sahel Greening" by media, is accounted for by enhancements in both the tropical easterly jet and the African easterly jet, both of which are known to induce wet anomalies. Moreover, positional shifts in the African easterly jet and African easterly waves (AEWs) accompanied the northward migration of the Sahel rainband. Change in the African easterly jet and AEWs are coupled to a northward shift and amplification of convective activity.

== United Nations response ==
In 1973, The United Nations Sahelian Office (UNSO) was created to address the problems of drought in the Sahel region following the West African Sahel drought of 1968–73. In the 1990s, the United Nations Convention to Combat Desertification (UNCCD) was adopted and UNSO became the United Nations Development Programme's Office to Combat Desertification and Drought, as its scope broadened to be global rather than only focused on Africa.

== See also ==
- 2005–06 Niger food crisis
- 2010 Sahel famine
- 2011 East Africa drought
- 2020–2023 Horn of Africa drought
- Desertification
- Green Sahara
- Great Green Wall (Africa)
- List of years in the environment
- Yacouba Sawadogo
