= 2005–2006 Niger food crisis =

Food crisis in northern Niger between 2005 and 2006

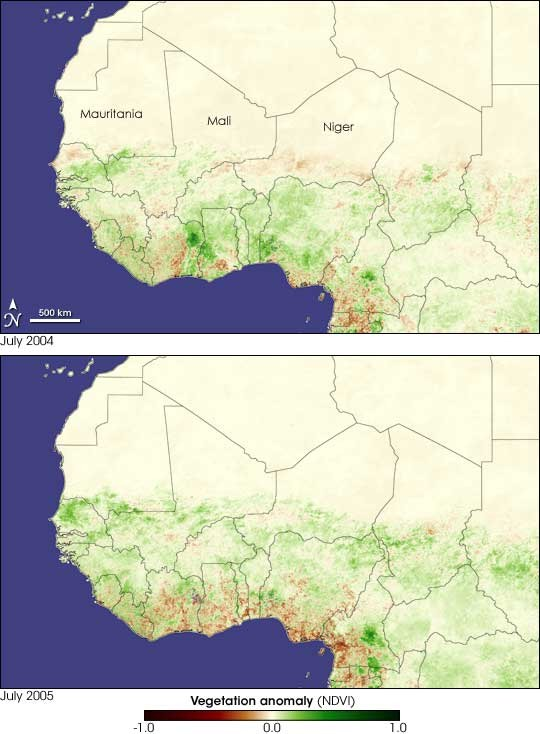
Niger vegetation maps. Above, July 2004; below, July 2005. Green is a vegetation surplus, brown a deficit. NASA

The 2005–2006 Niger food crisis was a severe but localized food security crisis in the regions of northern Maradi, Tahoua, Tillabéri, and Zinder of Niger from 2005 to 2006. It was caused by an early end to the 2004 rains, desert locust damage to some pasture lands, high food prices, and chronic poverty. In the affected area, 2.4 million of 3.6 million people are considered highly vulnerable to food insecurity. An international assessment stated that, of these, over 800,000 face extreme food insecurity and another 800,000 in moderately insecure food situations are in need of aid.

== Background ==
The crisis had long been predicted after swarms of locusts consumed nearly all crops in parts of Niger during the 2004 agricultural season. In other areas, insufficient rainfall resulted in exceptionally poor harvests and dry pastures affecting both farmers and livestock breeders. An assessment carried out by the government of Niger, the United Nations and international Non Governmental Organizations reached a general consensus that the crisis, while locally severe, had not reached the level of famine according to famine scales.

=== Demographic causes ===
The population of Niger increased more than fivefold between 1950 and 2005, from 2.5 million to 13.5 million. The fertility rate in Niger is the highest in the world at 7.6 children per woman, and the population of the country is projected to increase tenfold in the 21st century to more than 200 million people in 2100.

== Crisis ==
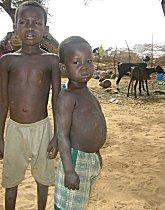
Malnourished children in Niger, during the 2005 famine.

The Sahel region as a whole registered a grain surplus of 85,000 tons. However, Niger and Chad suffered grain deficits of around 224,000 and 217,000 tons, respectively. An increase in food prices fuelled the food crisis, especially in Niger, which was the most affected area.

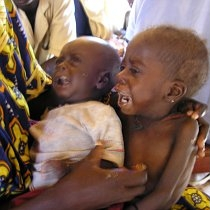
Laure Souley holds her three-year-old daughter and an infant son at a MSF aide centre during the 2005 famine, Maradi, Niger.

Access to food staples became increasingly difficult and severe cases of child malnutrition were reported. The scarcity of water and fodder also adversely affected the health of the cattle, camels, sheep and goats that comprise virtually the only source of food and income for nomadic communities. Competition for limited resources also resulted in some local conflicts. Acute malnutrition rates rose to 13.4 per cent in the southern Niger Maradi and Zinder departments, with 2.5 per cent of this group identified as severely malnourished children under age five, according to UNICEF.

The food shortage impacted 3.3 million people —including 800,000 children under age five— in 3,815 villages. Officials estimated cereal deficits at 223,448 tons and livestock feed deficits at 4,642,219 tons.

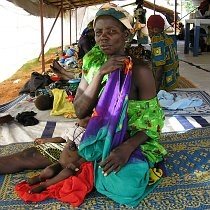
A mother tends to her malnourished infant at the Maradi MSF aide centre, during the 2005 Nigerien famine.

== Response ==
Although UN's Food and Agriculture Organization already warned of an upcoming crisis in late 2004, donor support came slowly throughout the first half of 2005. In late August 2005, the profile of the crisis was raised after UN Secretary-General Kofi Annan visited President Tandja Mamadou in Zinder. The visit was seen as an attempt to draw attention to the crisis, and also address accusations that the UN had responded slowly. Donors had given less than half of the US$81 million appealed for by the UN.

On January 16, 2006, the UN directed an appeal for US$240 million of food aid for West Africa to feed at least 10 million people affected by the food crisis, with Niger being the worst-affected country.

== Media coverage controversy ==
Several authorities, including the President of Niger at the time, called into the question the veracity of claims made by international media. They argued that, while chronic malnutrition has been issue for populations of Niger, the media erroneously and deliberately portrayed common local dietary habits as signs of widespread famine to appeal to donors' sympathy. On March 3, 2008 TV2 Norway aired the documentary "Sultbløffen" (The Famine Scam) which voiced the view that there was no famine in Niger in 2005– 06, but rather chronic malnutrition no different from the previous years. BBC's Hilary Andersson, UN Emergency Relief Coordinator Jan Egeland as well as international media and aid organizations in general were accused of severely overstating and lying about the food situation in the country by misrepresenting the situation. The sources, among them a Norwegian-Swedish foundation of agricultural development and their local assistants, gave a version picturing western media and relief agencies as ignorant towards local agriculture and flora and common dietary habits. They cited so-called "food-racism": the perception that local, traditional food and food plants are useless and poisonous, even though locals have eaten them for millennia. They also denounced the perception that the people of Niger are incapable of living without support from the west, and argued that large food donations overwhelmed the local supply, making it harder for local agriculture to compete. The film was awarded 3rd prize in the Monte Carlo TV festival of 2008, and won Den Store Journalistprisen in Norway in 2009. The BBC claimed to have refuted TV2's allegations unequivocally, and attempted to block the international release of the documentary by withdrawing TV2's license to news footage from the summer of 2005.

== See also ==
- 2006 Horn of Africa food crisis
- Malawian food crisis
- 2010 Sahel drought
