= List of Nigerien politicians =

The following is a list of Nigerien politicians, both past and present.

== A ==
- Abdoulaye, Souley
- Adji, Boukary
- Algabid, Hamid
- Amadou, Hama

== B ==
- Bakary, Djibo
- Bako, Mahamane Sani
- Bazoum, Mohamed
- Barkire Alidou

== C ==
- Cheiffou, Amadou
- Cissé, Amadou
- Courmo, Barcourgné

== D ==
- Diallo, Daouda
- Diori, Hamani
- Djermakoye, Moumouni Adamou
- Djibo, Amadou Ali

== H ==
- Habibou, Allele Elhadj
- Hama, Abdourahmane
- Hamidou, Hassan
- Hima, Mariama
- Habibou Allélé

== I ==
- Issoufou, Mahamadou
- Issoufou, Oumarou Garba

== K ==
- Kané, Illa
- Kountché, Seyni

== M ==
- Mahamidou, Aliou
- Maidah, Mamadou
- Maïnassara, Ibrahim Baré
- Marafah, Ahmed
- Mayaki, Adamou
- Mayaki, Ibrahim Hassane
- Mindaoudou, Aïchatou

== O ==
- Oumarou, Ide
- Oumarou, Mamane
- Ousmane, Mahamane
- Moussa Hassane Abdou

== S ==
- Sabo, Boukary
- Sabo, Nassirou
- Saibou, Ali
- Salifou, Amadou
- Salifou, André
- Sidikou, Abdou
- Sidikou, Maman Sambo
- Sidikou, Oumarou
- Souley, Hamadou

== T ==
- Tandja, Mamadou
- Taya, Omar Katzelma

== W ==
- Wanké, Daouda Malam
