= Ouhoumoudou Mahamadou's government =

Nigerien Government

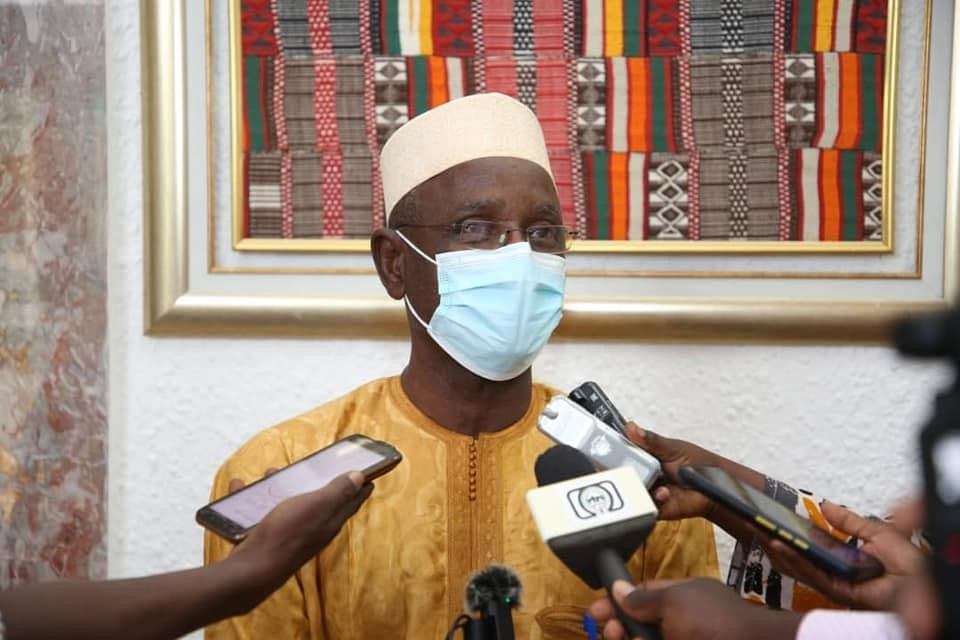
Ouhoumoudou Mahamadou in 2021.

Ouhoumoudou Mahamadou's government governed Niger from 9 April 2021 until its overthrow by the military following the 2023 Nigerien coup d'état on 26 July and its replacement by the National Council for the Safeguard of the Homeland.

== Ministers ==
The Government of Prime Minister Ouhoumoudou Mahamadou had 33 ministers.

- Ministry of Foreign Affairs and Cooperation: Hassoumi Massoudou
- Minister of State to the Presidency of the Republic: Rhissa Ag Boula
- Ministry of National Defense: Alkassoum Indatou
- Ministry of Interior and Decentralization: Alkache Alhada
- Ministry of Vocational Training: Kassoum Mamane Moctar
- Ministry of Higher Education and Research: Mamoudou Djibo
- Ministry of Public Health, Population and Social Affairs: Illiassou Idi Mainassara
- Ministry of Mines: Ousseini Hadizatou Yacouba
- Ministry of Post and New Information Technologies: Hassane Barazé Moussa
- Ministry of Transport: Oumarou Malam Alma
- Ministry of Humanitarian Action and Disaster Management: Laouan Magagi
- Ministry of Livestock and Government Spokesperson: Tidjani Idrissa Abdoulkadri
- Ministry of Equipment: Hamadou Adamou Souley
- Ministry of Justice and Keeper of the Seals: Boubakar Hassan
- Ministry of Communication, responsible for Relations with Institutions: Zada Mahamadou
- Ministry of Finance: Ahmat Jidoud
- Ministry of Trade, Industry and Youth Entrepreneurship: Gado Sabo Moctar
- Ministry of Agriculture: Alambedji Abba Issa
- Ministry of Urban Planning, Housing and Sanitation: Maïzoumbou Laoual Amadou
- Ministry of Planning: Abdou Rabiou
- Ministry of Petroleum, Energy and Renewable Energies: Mahamane Sani Mahamadou
- Ministry of Culture, Tourism and Handicrafts: Mohamed Hamid
- Ministry of Territorial Planning and Community Development: Maman Ibrahim Mahaman
- Ministry for the Promotion of Women and the Protection of Children: Allahoury Aminata Zourkaleini
- Ministry of National Education: Rabiou Ousman
- Ministry of Hydraulics: Adamou Mahaman
- Ministry of Public Service and Labor: Attaka Zaharatou
- Ministry of the Environment and the Fight against Desertification: Garama Saratou Rabiou Inoussa
- Ministry of Employment and Social Protection: Ibrahim Boukary
- Ministry of Youth and Sport: Sekou Doro Adamou
- Ministry Delegate to the Ministry of Finance, in charge of the Budget: Djibo Salamatou Gourouza Magagi
- Minister Delegate to the Ministry of the Interior and Decentralization, in charge of Decentralization: Dardaou Zaneidou
- Minister Delegate to the Ministry of State for Foreign Affairs and Cooperation, in charge of African Integration: Youssouf Mohamed Almouctar

== See also ==
- Cabinet of Niger
