= Sidikou =

Sidikou is a surname. Notable people with the surname include:

- Abdou Sidikou (1927–1973), Nigerian politician and diplomat
- Fatima Djibo Sidikou, Nigerien diplomat
- Maman Sambo Sidikou (born 1949), Nigerian politician and diplomat
- Oumarou Sidikou (1937?–2005), Nigerian politician
