= List of government ministers of Niger in 2009 =

Members of the Council of Ministers of Niger as of 30 June 2009 include:

- Prime Minister: Brigi Rafini
- Minister of State for the Interior, Public Safety and Decentralization: Albadé Abouba
- Minister of Foreign Affairs, Cooperation and African Integration: Aichatou Mindaoudou
- Minister of Economy and Finance: Ali Mahamane Lamine Zeine
- Minister of Agricultural Development: Ahaman Moussa
- Minister of Youth and Sports: TBA
- Minister of Urbanization, Housing and Land Registry: Aissa Diallo Abdoulaye
- Minister of Mines and Energy: Mohamed Abdoullahi
- Minister of Secondary and Higher Education, and Technology and Research: Sidikou Oumarou
- Minister of Communication, Spokesman of the Government: Mohamed Ben Omar
- Minister of the Civil Service and Labour: Kanda Siptey
- Minister of Culture, Arts and Leisure, in charge of the promotion of art-based entrepreneurship: Oumarou Hadary
- Minister of the Population and Social Reforms: TBA
- Minister of National Education: Ousmane Samba Mamadou
- Minister in Charge of Relations with State Institutions: Salifou Madou Kelzou
- Minister of the Environment and the fight against Desertification: Issoufou Bako
- Minister of National Competitiveness and the fight against the High Cost of Life: TBA
- Minister of Religious Affairs and Humanitarian Actions: Labo Issaka
- Minister of Equipment: Lamido Moumouni Harouna
- Minister of Trade, Industry and Normalization: Halidou Badje
- Minister of National Defense: Djida Hamadou (CDS-Rahama).
- Minister of Justice, Attorney General: Garba Lompo
- Minister of Transport and Civil Aviation: Colonel Issa Mazou
- Minister of Tourism and Handicrafts: Sani Morou Fatouma
- Minister of Land Development and Community Development: Sadé Souley
- Minister of Public Health: TBA
- Minister of Animal Resources: TBA
- Minister for the Promotion of the Young Entrepreneurs and the Reform of Public Companies: TBA
- Minister of Vocational and Technical Training: Dagra Mamadou
- Minister of Population, Women’s Promotion and the Protection of Children: Maikibi Kadiatou Dandobi
- Minister of African Integration and Nationals living abroad: TBA
- Minister of Water Resources: TBA.
