= Daouda =

Daouda is a given name. Notable people with the name include:

Surname

- Abdou Daouda, member of the National Assembly of Niger and government Minister
- Kamilou Daouda (born 1987), Nigerien footballer
- Kassaly Daouda (born 1983), Nigerien footballer
- Mariko Daouda (born 1981), Ivorian footballer

Given name

- Daouda Badarou (born 1929), Beninese politician
- Daouda Compaoré (born 1973), Burkinabé football player
- David Daouda Coulibaly (born 1978), Malian football player
- Daouda Diakité (born 1983), Burkinabé football goalkeeper
- Daouda Diémé (born 1989), Senegalese footballer
- Daouda Jabi (born 1981), Guinean footballer
- Daouda Kanté (born 1978), Malian football (soccer) defender
- Daouda Karaboué (born 1975), French handball player, Olympic gold medallist
- Daouda Marté, Nigerien politician
- Daouda Sow (boxer) (born 1983), amateur boxer from France
- Daouda Sow (politician) (1933–2009), Senegalese politician and legislator
- Daouda Malam Wanké (1946–2004), military and political leader in Niger

== See also ==
- Dauda (disambiguation)
- Douaouda
