= Dauda =

Dauda may refer to:

- Dauda (given name)
- Dauda (surname)
- Dauda, Nepal, a village in Saptari District
