= Soufiane Aghaichata Guichene =

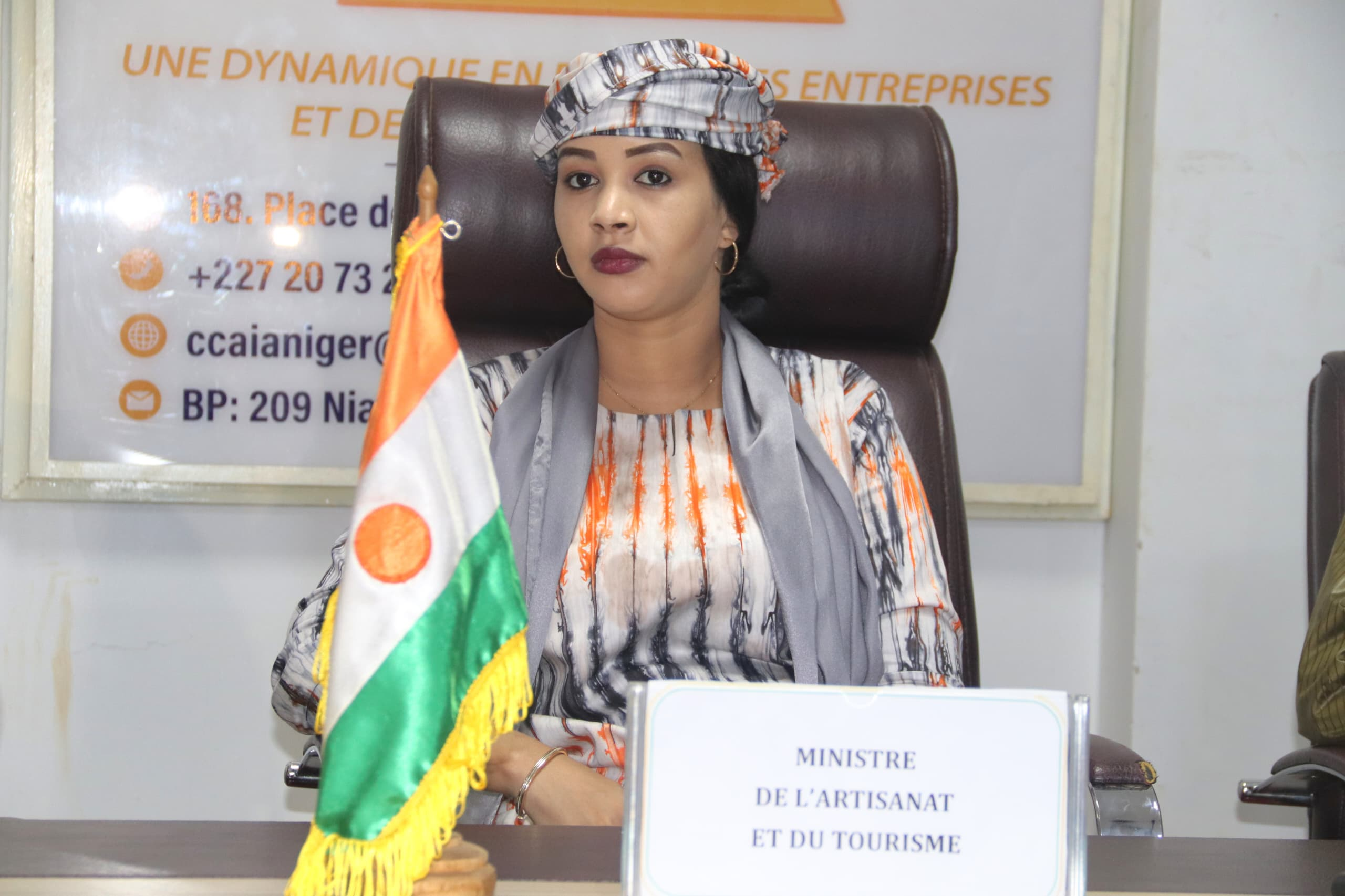

Minister for Crafts and Tourism
- Incumbent
- Assumed office August, 2023
- Prime Minister: Ali Lamine Zeine

Personal details
- Born: August 8, 1994 (age 32) Agadez, Niger
- Profession: Politician

Soufiane Aghaichata Guichene (born August 8, 1994) is a Nigerien politician. She has served as Minister of Crafts and Tourism of Niger since August 2023.

== Biography ==
Guichene was born on August 8, 1994, in Agadez, Niger. She began her career as a lawyer, specializing in human resources and logistics, after graduating with a degree in Business Law from the School for Legal and Economic Studies (ESEJE) in Mohammedia, Morocco.

In September 2022, Guichene began work as Human Resources and Legal Manager at Babati Petroleum Services in Niamey. She was appointed to the role of Minister of Crafts and Tourism of Niger in August of the following year, joining the government of Prime Minister Ali Lamine Zeine.

As Minister, Guichene signed a decree revoking the operational license of Soluxe International Hotel in Niamey in March 2025. Although the establishment of the hotel, built at the cost of 25 billion CFA francs from Chinese investors, had been the source of celebration upon its construction in 2013, the closure was said to be indicative of possible fallout for Sino-Nigerien relations. In revoking the license, the ministry cited infractions not limited to discriminatory practices and financial violations.

In 2026, Guichene spoke at the launch of the International Festival of Saharan Cultures (FICSA).
