= Mamadou Malam Aouami =

Nigerien jurist and government official

Minister of Justice of Niger
- In office 21 June 1976 – 9 February 1979
- President: Seyni Kountché

President of the Cour d’État
- In office 1984–1990

President of the Supreme Court of Niger
- In office 1990–1993
- In office 2000–2005

Personal details
- Occupation: Jurist, Government Official

Mamadou Malam Aouami is a Nigerien jurist and former government official. He served as the country’s Minister of Justice from 1976 to 1979, and later held several high-ranking judicial positions, most notably as President of the Cour d’État and the Supreme Court of Niger.

== Career ==
=== Minister of Justice ===
According to the Ministry of Justice(Niger), Mamadou Malam Aouami was appointed Minister of Justice (Garde des Sceaux) under the military government of Lieutenant General Seyni Kountché. He served from 21 June 1976 to 9 February 1979.

=== President of Cour d’État and Supreme Court ===
He later became President of the Cour d’État, a judicial body with administrative and civil jurisdiction, serving from 1984 to 1990. Aouami was subsequently appointed President of the Supreme Court of Niger, serving two terms: first from 1990 to 1993 and then from 2000 to 2005.

In a notable Supreme Court decision delivered on 12 June 1987, he was listed as "President and Rapporteur" in ruling 1987 CS 4 (JN), demonstrating his active role in leading legal deliberations and drafting court opinions.

== Legacy ==
Through his appointments to high-level government and judicial roles, Mamadou Malam Aouami played a central part in shaping Niger’s justice system, particularly during times of political transition. His contributions influenced legal reforms and strengthened the leadership of key national courts. He is remembered as a principled magistrate who served under both military and civilian governments.
