= Ahmat Jidoud =

Nigerien economist and former politician (born 1980)

Minister of Finance of Niger
- In office 7 April 2021 – 26 July 2023
- President: Mohamed Bazoum
- Preceded by: Mamadou Diop

Minister Delegate in charge of the Budget
- In office May 2016 – April 2021
- President: Mahamadou Issoufou; Mohamed Bazoum
- Minister: Hassoumi Massaoudou; Mamadou Diop
- Preceded by: Mohamed Boucha

Personal details
- Born: Ahmat Jidoud; January 1, 1980 (age 46) Nobi, Tahoua Region, Niger
- Education: Lycée d'Excellence de Niamey (B.A); Hassan I University (M.S); Toulouse School of Economics (PhD)
- Occupation: Economist, politician

Ahmat Jidoud (born 1 January 1980) is a Nigerien economist and politician who served as Minister of Finance of Niger from 7 April 2021 to 26 July 2023. He previously served as Minister Delegate in charge of the Budget from May 2016 to April 2021. His term ended when he was detained during the 2023 Nigerien coup d'état and not released until April 2025.

== Early life and education ==
Jidoud was born on 1 January 1980 in Nobi, in Niger's Tahoua Region. He attended Nobi Primary School from 1988 to 1994, followed by the College of General Education in Malbaza. He completed his secondary education at the Lycée d'Excellence de Niamey, where he earned a Baccalaureate in the C series.

He studied economics at Hassan I University in Settat, Morocco, earning a master's degree. He then pursued postgraduate studies at the Toulouse School of Economics in France, where he obtained master's degrees in economic engineering and mathematical economics/econometrics. He completed a doctorate in economics with a dissertation on the structural macroeconomics of business cycle fluctuations.

== Career ==
=== Early career (2005-2016) ===
From late 2005 to early 2006, Jidoud worked as a statistician for Niger's Community Action Program. He then worked for the National Institute of Statistics of Niger as a statistician-economist from February to August 2006. Between 2008 and 2013, while completing his doctoral studies, Jidoud worked at the Toulouse School of Economics as a teaching assistant and temporary research attaché.

In 2013, Jidoud joined the International Monetary Fund (IMF) in Washington, D.C. He worked in its African Department as a desk economist for Comoros from 2013 to 2015, and then from December 2015 to May 2016 he held similar responsibilities for Burkina Faso.

=== Ministerial career (2016-2023) ===
In May 2016, Jidoud was appointed Minister Delegate in charge of the Budget under Finance Minister Massoudou Hassoumi in the government of President Mahamadou Issoufou. He also served under Finance Minister Mamadou Diop in the same capacity.

On 7 April 2021, President Mohamed Bazoum appointed Jidoud Minister of Finance. In this role, he supervised the countries finance policy, government budget, petrol line development, and tax reforms. He also represented Niger in dealings with global financial institutions, including the IMF - World Bank, and the OPEC Fund for International Development.

His tenure ended on 26 July 2023, when a military coup overthrew Bazoum's government. Jidoud himself was detained alongside former officials, and released from custody around 2 April 2025.

== Personal life ==
Jidoud speaks Tamasheq, Hausa, Zarma, French and English.

In the uncertainty that emerged following the military coup, a video of Marou Amadou (Niger’s justice minister in 2021) overcome by emotion while thanking president Mahamadou Issoufou for his support was falsely attributed and claimed to be a distraught Jidoud being forced to account for “stolen” funds or face execution by the junta.
