= Ministry of Foreign Affairs, Cooperation and African Integration =

Government ministry of the Republic of Niger

Agency overview
- Headquarters: Niamey
- Minister responsible: Bakary Yaou Sangaré

The Ministry of Foreign Affairs, Cooperation and African Integration of the Government of Niger (var. Foreign Ministry) is the government authority responsible for the foreign relations of Niger and its diplomatic corps abroad. The Foreign Ministry is headed by the Minister of Foreign Affairs, a political appointment who sits in the Council of Ministers of Niger, reporting directly to the President of Niger. "African Integration" is a reference to the Minister's role in the African Union and its long desired Pan-African project on continental integration.

Minister Bakary Yaou Sangaré has held the post since 2023.

== Structure ==
Overseen by the Minister and his office is the General Secretariat of the Ministry of Foreign Affairs. Offices below this are the Directorate of Bilateral African Cooperation, which oversees the diplomatic missions of Niger in Africa, the Directorate Europe, for embassies to and relations with European governments, and the Directorate America, Asia and Oceania, for those governments. Multilateral contacts with the African Union and other African bodies are overseen by the Directorate of African Union and Integration, while the Directorate of United Nations and International Organisations oversees missions to the United Nations (and Niger's Consulate in New York) and other bodies (such as Unesco).

== List of ministers ==
This is a list of ministers of foreign affairs of Niger:

- 1958–1963: Hamani Diori
- 1963–1965: Adamou Mayaki
- 1965–1967: Hamani Diori
- 1967–1970: Abdou Sidikou
- 1970............ Barcourgné Courmo
- 1970–1972: Mamadou Maidah
- 1972–1974: Boukary Sabo
- 1974–1979: Moumouni Adamou Djermakoye
- 1979–1983: Daouda Diallo
- 1983–1985: Ide Oumarou
- 1985–1988: Mahamane Sani Bako
- 1988–1989: Allele Elhadj Habibou
- 1989–1991: Mahamane Sani Bako
- 1991–1993: Hassane Hamidou
- 1993–1995: Abdourahmane Hama
- 1995–1996: Mohamed Bazoum
- 1996............ André Salifou
- 1996–1997: Ibrahim Hassane Mayaki
- 1997–1999: Maman Sambo Sidikou
- 1999–2000: Aïchatou Mindaoudou
- 2000–2001: Nassirou Sabo
- 2001–2010: Aïchatou Mindaoudou
- 2010–2011: Aminatou Maïga Touré
- 2011–2015: Mohamed Bazoum
- 2015–2016: Aïchatou Boulama Kané
- 2016–2018: Ibrahim Yacouba
- 2018–2021: Kalla Ankourao
- 2021–2023: Hassoumi Massaoudou
- 2023–present: Bakary Yaou Sangaré

== See also ==
- Government of Niger
