= Ministry of Justice (Niger) =

Nigerien minister

== Introduction ==
Established in 1960, the Ministry of Justice of Niger provides litigants and citizens with the means of the Judicial System (magistrates, clerks, courts and paralegals) for access to justice.

== List of ministers ==
=== First Republic Under President Diori Hamani ===
- Boubacar Diallo (1960–1963)
- Issoufou Saidou Djermakoye (1963–1965)
- Mom Dan Dobi (1965–1970)
- Amadou Issaka (1970)
- Barkiré Halidou (1970–1974)

=== Regime of Seyni Kountche ===
- Sory Diallo Mamadou (1974–1975)
- Dupuis Henry Yacouba (1975–1976)
- Mamadou Malam Aouami (1976–1979)
- Alou Harouna (1979–1982)
- Mahamadou Halilou Sabo (1982–1983)
- Allele El Hadji Habibou (1983–1985)
- Hadj Nadjir (1985–1987)
- Mallam Oubandawaki (1987)

=== Regime of the Second Republic of General Ali Seybou ===
- Abdourahamane Soly (1987–1989)
- Ali Bondiare (1989–1991)

=== First Transition Under Cheffou Amadou as Prime Minister, Head of Government ===
- Issaka Sounna (1991–1992)
- Abdou Tchousso (1992–1993)

=== Third Republic Under President Mahamane Ousmane ===
- Kandine Mallam Adam (1993–1994)
- Tahirou Amadou (1994–1995)
- Ibrahim Beidou (1995–1996)

=== Fourth Republic: Regime of General Ibrahim Bare Mainassara ===
- Boubé Oumarou (1996–1997)
- Abba Musa Issoufou (1997–1999)

=== Regime under Commander Daouda Malam Wanké ===
- Mahaman Laouali Dan-Dah (1999–2000)

=== Fifth and Sixth Republic of Mamadou Tandja ===
- Ali Sirfi Maiga (2000–2001)
- Maty El Hadji Moussa (2001–2007)
- Mamadou Dagra (2007–2009)
- Garba Lompo (2009–2010)

=== Regime of the Military Transition of Salou Djibo ===
- Abdoulaye Djibo (2010–2011)

=== Seventh Republic Under President Issoufou Mahamadou ===
- Marou Amadou (2011–2021)

=== Seventh Republic Under President Mohamed Bazoum ===
- Dr. Boubakar Hassan (2021–present).

== See also ==
- Justice ministry
- Politics of Niger
