= Bureau Nigérien du Droit d'Auteur =

Bureau Nigérien du Droit d'Auteur (BNDA) is the Niger office that manages copyright under the technical supervision of the Ministry of Culture and under the financial supervision of the Ministry of Finance. The director is Ganda Tahirou.

It became a member of the International Confederation of Societies of Authors and Composers on October 15, 1997.
