= Bilabrin =

- Location within Niger
- Coordinates: 14°25′41″N 13°25′18″E
- Country: Niger
- Region: Diffa Region
- Department: N'guigmi Department
- Commune: Nguigmi

Bilabrin (also spelled Bélabirim, Bélabirin, Bilaberim, Bilabrim, Bilabrine, Boulabirina, Boula Brin, Boulabrin) is a village located in the commune of N'guigmi, Diffa Region, in southeast Niger. The village is approximately six kilometers west of the Chad–Niger border.

Bilabrin is the birthplace of former Niger President Mohamed Bazoum.

== Geography ==
The village is located north of Lake Chad at an altitude of 285 meters, approximately six kilometers west of the international border with Chad. The city of N'guigmi, capital of the surrounding of N'guigmi commune of the same name, is located 37 kilometers southwest of Bilabrin.

Bilabrin lies in the transition zone between the Sahara and the Sahel. The village receives between 200 and 300 mm of annual rainfall per year.

== Population ==
Bilabrin recorded a population of 838 residents in 181 households in the 2001 Nigerien census. That marked a population increase from the 1988 census, which registered a village population of 260 residents living in 66 households.

== History ==
French adventurer Stéphane Desombre stopped in Bilabrin in 1937 during his north to south crossing of the Sahara Desert.

The Islamic terrorist group Boko Haram, which is based in neighboring northeast Nigeria, staged attacks in Bilabrin on 29-30 October 2019, which killed twelve Nigerien soldiers and wounded eight others. A second Boko Haram attack on the night of 18-19 May 2020 also killed twelve Nigerien soldiers and wounded approximately twenty people.

== Notable residents ==
Former President of Niger Mohamed Bazoum, who is a member of the Ouled Slimane people, was born in Bilabrin in 1960.
