= Elisabeth Sherif =

Elizabeth Sherif

Minister of National Education, Literacy, Vocational Education & Promotion of National Languages
- Incumbent
- Assumed office 14 August 2023
- President: Abdourahamane Tiani
- Prime Minister: Ali Lamine Zeine

Elisabeth Sherif is a Nigerien political scientist specializing in the analysis of electoral processes and political participation in Africa.

== Career ==
She holds degrees from the Doctoral School of Political Science in Bordeaux, France, and the Department of Political Science at the University of Ibadan, Nigeria.

In August 2023, she was appointed Minister of National Education, Literacy, Vocational Training, and the Promotion of National Languages of Niger. She assumed office on 14 August, 2023.
