= Garama Saratou Rabiou Inoussa =

Nigerien politician (born 1977)

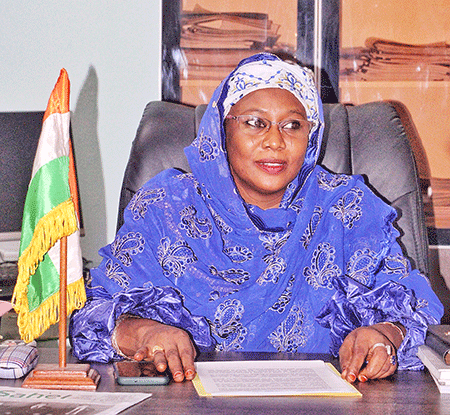
- Garama Saratou Rabiou Inoussa

Minister for Environment and Combating Desertification
- In office 7 April 2021 – 26 July 2023
- President: Mohamed Bazoum
- Prime Minister: Ouhoumoudou Mahamadou
- Preceded by: Almoustapha Garba (as Environment and Sustainable Development)
- Succeeded by: Maizama Abdoulaye (as Hydraulics, Sanitation and Environment)

Personal details
- Born: 3 September 1977 (age 48) Niamey, Niger
- Occupation: Politician

Garama Saratou Rabiou Inoussa (born 3 September 1977) is a Nigerien politician. She serves as a minister in the government of Mohamed Bazoum.

== Early life and education ==
Garama Saratou Rabiou Inoussa holds a master's degree in project management and a bachelor's degree in sociology. She is a volunteer, a member of the board, and a program officer for Circle-Dev. She coordinated the project for the prevention of violent extremism among youth in the peri-urban areas of Niamey (PREV) and the Sport-Dev project in Tillabéry before being appointed minister in April 2021.

== Political career ==
She was appointed Minister for Environment and Combating Desertification in Bazoum's government. She was a speaker at the 2023 International Union for Conservation of Nature Leaders Forum, held in Geneva, Switzerland. She has also advocated for wealthy nations to fulfil commitments to establish a Climate Loss Fund to assist least developed countries with the financial costs of climate change.
