= Yaou Sangaré Bakary =

Nigerien politician

Minister of Foreign Affairs
- Incumbent
- Assumed office 10 August 2023
- Preceded by: Hassoumi Massaoudou

Yaou Sangaré Bakary is a Nigerien politician who has been Minister of Foreign Affairs since 2023. He was previously ambassador to Cuba and the United Nations.

In 2025, he met with Wang Yi and stated that China was a strategic partner for Niger. The previous year, China has extended a new US $400 million loan-for-oil to Niger after militants strained CNPC's operations in Niger and Benin.
