= Ataka Zaharatou =

Nigerien politician

Ataka or Attaka Zaharatou Boubacar is a Nigerien politician and former government minister associated with the MPR-Jamhuriya party.

In April 2021 Zaharatou was named as Minister of Public Service and Labor in Ouhoumoudou Mahamadou's government. In December 2021 she was replaced as Minister for Public Service, succeeded by Hadiza Dourara Kafougou.
