= Allahoury Aminata Zourkaleini =

Nigerien politician

Minister for the Promotion of Women and the Protection of Children
- In office April 2021 – 2023

Personal details
- Occupation: Politician

Allahoury Aminata Zourkaleini is a Nigerien politician who served as the Minister for the Promotion of Women and the Protection of Children in Ouhoumoudou Mahamadou's government from April 2021 until her arrest during the 2023 Nigerien coup d'état.
