= Boubakar Hassan =

Nigerien politician and jurist

Minister of Justice and Keeper of the Seals
- In office 7 April 2021 – 29 November 2021
- Preceded by: Marou Amadou
- Succeeded by: Ikta Abdoulaye Mohamed

Boubakar Hassan is a Nigerien politician and jurist who served as Minister of Justice and Keeper of the Seals from 7 April to 29 November 2021 under President Mohamed Bazoum and Prime Minister Ouhoumoudou Mahamadou.

== Career ==
In May 2021, Hassan visited the École de Formation Judiciaire and several national judicial agencies in Niamey to assess their operational conditions and infrastructure, underscoring his efforts to strengthen judicial institutions.

He also held working sessions with the International Development Law Organization (IDLO) to launch a five-year €18,000,000 program aimed at reinforcing penal justice systems in regions such as Dosso, Tahoua, and Tillabéri.

In late September 2021, Hassan led Niger’s delegation to the United Nations Human Rights Council in Geneva, presenting Niger’s third Universal Periodic Review report and affirming the adoption of 248 out of 254 recommendations focused on human rights frameworks and access to justice.

== End of tenure ==
Hassan's term ended on 29 November 2021 during a cabinet reshuffle by Prime Minister Mahamadou, and he was succeeded as Minister of Justice by Ikta Abdoulaye Mohamed.
