= Fatima Djibo Sidikou =

Nigerien diplomat

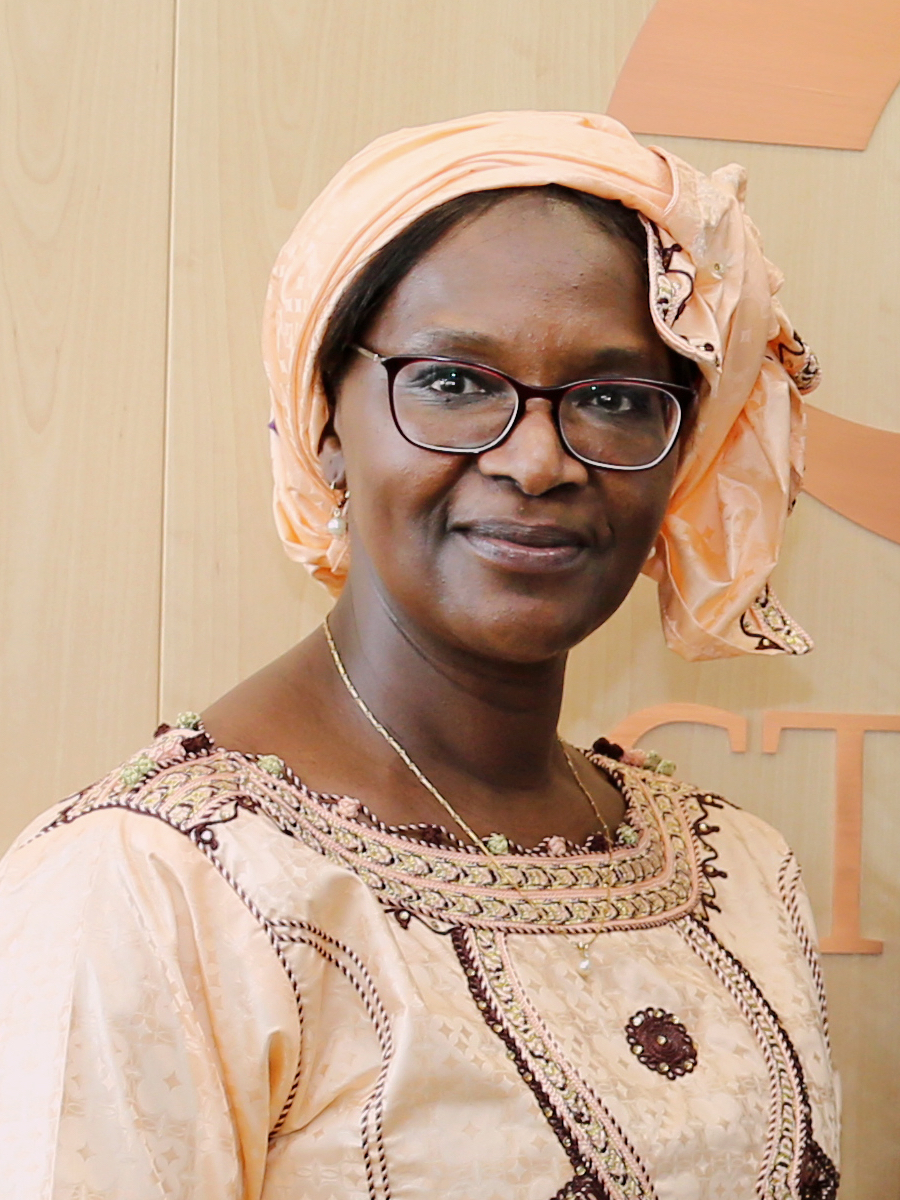

Niger Ambassador to Senegal
- In office January 2019 – 2022

Personal details
- Spouse: Maman Sambo Sidikou
- Occupation: diplomat

Fatima Djibo Sidikou is a Nigerien diplomat. Having served in a variety of diplomatic posts in the United States and at the United Nations Office at Geneva, she most recently served as Niger's ambassador to Senegal from 2019 to 2022.

== Career ==
Sidikou first joined the Ministry of Foreign Affairs in 1983.

From 2002 to 2012 she worked at the Nigerien Embassy in the United States, where she served as first counselor and chargé d'affaires. She also helped represent Niger at UNESCO from 2007 to 2012.

She became president of the Association of Pastoralists in Niger in 2012. The following year, she took over leadership of the Permanent Secretariat of the Rural Code, which supports agricultural producers.

Sidikou was appointed permanent representative of Niger to the United Nations Office at Geneva in 2015. She has also simultaneously served as Nigerien ambassador to Switzerland, Austria, and Liechtenstein.

In 2019, she succeeded the late Hassane Kounou as Niger's ambassador to Senegal. She was later also accredited to represent her country in Guinea-Bissau in 2021. In 2022, she was replaced by Ambassador Abbami Ari.

== Personal life ==
A Fulani, Sidikou is from a pastoralist community in northern Niger. She is married to fellow diplomat Maman Sambo Sidikou. They have two children.
