= Abdou Daouda =

Nigerien politician

Abdou Daouda was a member of the National Assembly of Niger and government Minister in the West African nation of Niger. He was Minister of Vocational and Technical Training from 2004 to 2007 and Minister of National Competitiveness and the fight against the High Cost of Life from 2007 to his death. He was killed in a road accident on 15 May 2009.

Born in Gafati, a village near the city of Zinder, Abdou—his surname—was a founding member of the CDS-Rahama party and sat on its Political Bureau at the time of his death. The CDS was a government partner with the ruling MNDS from 1999. He was buried at a cemetery in the "Birini" (old town) of Zinder in a ceremony attended by the Prime Minister of Niger, members of the Council of Ministers, and the Sultan of Damagaram.
