= Habibou Allélé =

Nigerien politician and diplomat

Minister of Foreign Affairs and Cooperation
- In office 15 July 1988 – 19 May 1989
- Preceded by: Sani Bako
- Succeeded by: Sani Bako

Personal details
- Born: 1938 Niamey, Niger
- Died: 2016 (aged 77–78) Tunis, Tunisia
- Party: MNSD-Nassara
- Occupation: Politician, diplomat

Habibou Allélé (1938 in Niamey - 9/10 December 2016 in Tunis) was a Nigerien politician and diplomat.

== Life ==
Habibou Allélé belonged to the ethnic group called Tuareg. He is a trained teacher and worked as a school principal from 1957 to 1969. Allélé became chief of staff to Health Minister Issa Ibrahim in 1969. He soon entered the diplomatic service and served as Niger's ambassador to various African countries: from 1971 to 1974 in Ivory Coast, from 1974 to 1980 in Ghana, and from 1980 to 1982 in Senegal.

== Political career ==
After his return, he served as mayor of the capital, Niamey, from 1982 to 1983. Then, head of state Seyni Kountché brought him into his government. He served as Minister of Justice from 24 January 1983, succeeding Mahamadou Halilou Sabbo. On 23 September 1985, he became Minister of Agriculture. Hadj Nadjir became the new Minister of Justice. On 7 September 1987, Allélé also took over the Environment portfolio from Attaher Darkoye. Under Ali Saïbou, Seyni Kountché's successor as head of state, Habibou Allélé succeeded Amadou Nouhou as Minister of Mines and Energy on 20 November 1987. The Agriculture and Environment portfolios were assigned to Amadou Mamadou. On 15 July 1988, Allélé was appointed Minister of Foreign Affairs and Cooperation, succeeding Sani Bako. Adamou Souna became the new Minister of Mines and Energy. Alléla resigned from the government on 19 May 1989. Sani Bako again became Minister of Foreign Affairs and Cooperation.

== Achievements ==
In 1989, Allélé was one of the founding members of the then unified party MNSD-Nassara. In the 1989 parliamentary elections, he was elected as an MNSD-Nassara deputy in the Tchirozérine constituency to the National Assembly, which was dissolved in 1991. After the introduction of the multi-party system, he was re-elected as an MNSD-Nassara deputy in the 1993 and 1995 parliamentary elections. He was a member of parliament until 1996.

In later years, Allélé worked as chairman of the board of directors of the Nigerien uranium mining company Compagnie Minière d'Akouta. For the MNSD-Nassara, he was party secretary for external affairs and a member of the party's Council of Elders until his death. Habibou Elhadj Allélé died in 2016 in Tunis, where he was receiving medical treatment.
