= Ousseini Hadizatou Yacouba =

Nigerien politician and activist

- Born: November 9, 1958 (age 67)
- Occupation: Politician

Ousseini Hadizatou Yacouba (born November 9, 1958) is a politician in Niger. Since 2013, she has served as the Deputy Chief of Staff to Mahamadou Issoufou, with the rank of minister. In April 2021, she was appointed Minister of Mines in the government of Ouhoumoudou Mahamadou. In July 2023, following the coup d'état, Ousseini Hadizatou Yacouba was arrested and placed under house arrest by the military junta.
