= Djibo Salamatou Gourouza Magagi =

Nigerien politician

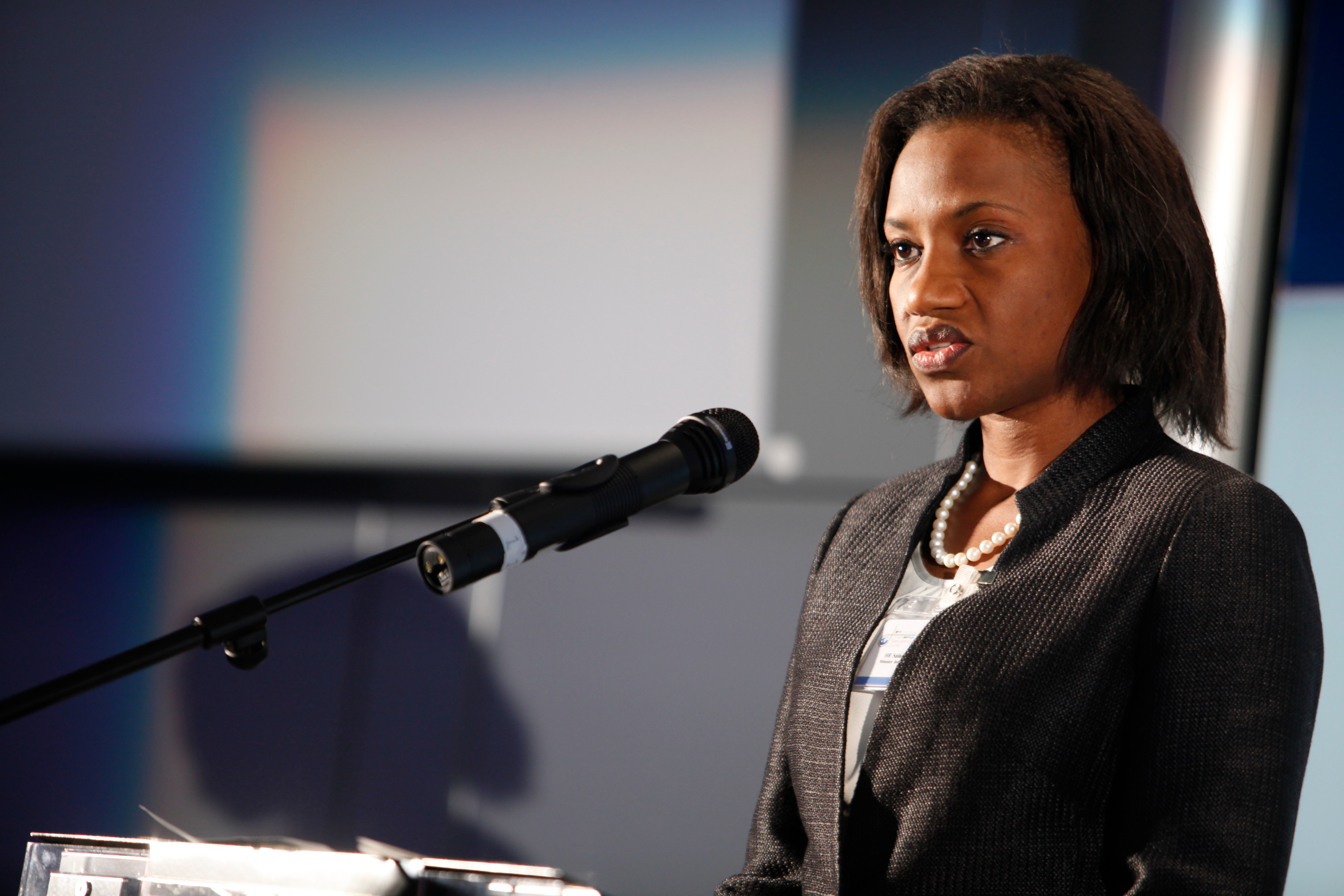
Djibo Salamatou Gourouza Magagi

Djibo Salamatou Gourouza Magagi is a government official in Niger.

In 2010, Magagi was the Minister of Urban Planning, Housing, and Regional Planning.

In 2021, Magagi was the budget minister delegate.

Currently Magagi is Minister of Industry and Youth Entrepreneurship.
