= Ibrahim Hassane Mayaki =

Nigerien politician

Ibrahim Assane Mayaki
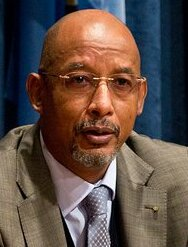

Prime Minister of Niger
- In office 27 November 1997 – 1 January 2000
- President: Ibrahim Baré Maïnassara; Daouda Malam Wanké; Mamadou Tandja
- Preceded by: Amadou Cissé
- Succeeded by: Hama Amadou

Personal details
- Born: 24 September 1951 (age 74)
- Parent: Adamou Mayaki

Ibrahim Assane Mayaki (born 24 September 1951) is a Nigerien politician, who served as the Prime Minister of Niger from 27 November 1997 to 1 January 2000.

== Fourth Republic ==
Under President Ibrahim Baré Maïnassara, who seized power in a January 1996 coup, Mayaki was named Deputy Minister for Cooperation, under the Minister of Foreign Affairs, André Salifou, on 23 August 1996. He was then named Minister of Foreign Affairs and Nigeriens Abroad in December 1996, in which position he served until being named Prime Minister in November 1997.

== Fifth Republic ==
When President Maïnassara was overthrown and assassinated in April 1999, Mayaki was reappointed by Daouda Malam Wanké, the leader of the military coup, to lead the country during the transition to new elections. He left office after the elections were held late in the year.

=== United States political scandal ===
According to the U.S. Senate Select Committee on Intelligence report on prewar intelligence, Joe Wilson said that during Mayaki's time in office he was contacted by a businessman who asked him to meet with a delegation from Saddam Hussein's Iraq government, to discuss "expanding commercial relations." Mayaki interpreted that to mean they wanted to discuss the sale of yellowcake uranium, a natural resource of Niger, though in the meeting with the delegation, the subject of uranium never came up.

None of the CIA, DIA, or INR analysts said this gave weight to claims that Iraq was trying to get uranium from Africa, and the Vice President (who requested the information that prompted Wilson's trip to Niger) was not briefed on the issue. There is no evidence that this claim about the meeting of an Iraqi delegation with Mayaki was used to bolster the case for war, or that it was in any way related to U.S. President George W. Bush's claim in the 2003 State of the Union address that "The British government has learned that Saddam Hussein recently sought significant quantities of uranium from Africa," which was based on what the British say in the Butler Report is completely separate evidence.

== Later career ==
In August 2000, Mayaki created the Public Policy Analysis Circle (Cercle d'analyse des politiques publiques), a thinktank focusing on health and education policy.

Since 2009, Mayaki has headed the New Partnership for Africa's Development (NEPAD), an African Union body located in Midrand, South Africa. In 2016, he was appointed by Erik Solheim, the Chairman of the Development Assistance Committee, to serve on the High Level Panel on the Future of the Development Assistance Committee under the leadership of Mary Robinson. Later that year, he was appointed by United Nations Secretary-General Ban Ki-moon to serve as member of the Lead Group of the Scaling Up Nutrition Movement.

In March 2020, Mayaki was appointed by the President of the United Nations General Assembly and the President of the United Nations Economic and Social Council as one of the two co-chairs of the High Level Panel on International Financial Accountability Transparency and Integrity for Achieving the 2030 Agenda (FACTI Panel). From September 2023, Mayaki will be teaching a course on African Studies, along with Marco Massoni, at Libera Università Internazionale degli Studi Sociali Guido Carli Luiss University ] in Rome.

== Other activities ==
- Global Partnership for Effective Development Co-operation, Member of the Steering Committee

== Honours ==
In 2011, Mayaki was awarded medal of Officer in the National Order of Agricultural Merit, an order of merit established by the French government in 1883.

On 7 November 2019 Ibrahim Assane Mayaki was awarded the title of "Grand Cordon of the Order of the Rising Sun" by Japanese Emperor Naruhito. This decoration, the highest distinction of the State of Japan, recognizes his contribution to the promotion of friendly relations between Japan, Niger and, more broadly, the African Union.

== Publications ==
In addition to several academic articles, he published La Caravane Passe (Paris, Odilon Média, 1999, 210 p. ISBN 2-84213-029-4), a book relating his political experience.

Political offices
Preceded by Amadou Cissé	Prime Minister of Niger; 1997–2000	Succeeded by Hama Amadou
Preceded by André Salifou	Foreign Minister of Niger; 1996–1997	Succeeded by Maman Sambo Sidikou
