= Alou Harouna =

Nigerien politician and diplomat

- Born: 24 March 1942 (age 84); Tillabéri
- Citizenship: Nigerien
- Education: Lycée National Niamey
- Occupation: Diplomat Politician

Alou Harouna (born March 24, 1942 in Tillabéri; sometimes spelt Alou Arouna) is a Nigerien politician and diplomat.

== Life and education ==
Alou Harouna attended primary schools in Madaoua and Bonkoukou and the Lycée National in Niamey. He graduated with a law degree and began working as a department head in the Nigerien civil service in 1968. In the cabinet of the Minister of the Interior, he rose first to administrative director, then to technical advisor. He spent a year in Bordeaux for further training in 1972. The following year, he became cabinet director of the Minister of the Interior, Yansambou Maïga Diamballa.

== Personal life ==
Alou Harouna is married and has several children.

== Political career ==
Following the overthrow of President Hamani Diori on April 15, 1974, and the beginning of the rule of the Supreme Council of the Armed Forces, the new head of state, Seyni Kountché, brought Alou Harouna into his government, where he remained until 1982. From June 8, 1974, to February 21, 1976, Harouna served as Secretary of State for the Interior. Kountché himself held the superior office of Minister of the Interior at the beginning and end of his term, while Idrissa Arouna held it from November 30, 1974, to June 3, 1975. On February 21, 1976, Harouna became Minister of the Interior, attached to the Presidential Chancellery. From June 7, 1976, he served as Minister of the Civil Service and Labor, and Minister of Posts and Telecommunications. These positions had previously been held by Mamadou Diallo Sory, who was then appointed Minister of the Interior. Alou Harouna succeeded Mamadou Malam Aouami as Minister of Justice on 10 September 1979. Mamadou Diallo Sory took over the portfolios of Posts and Telecommunications, and Issoufou Mayaki took over the Public Service and Labor portfolios. Harouna left the government on 14 June 1982. He was succeeded as Minister of Justice by Mahamadou Halilou Sabbo.

On 5 August 1982, Alou Harouna was appointed Niger's ambassador to the Soviet Union, succeeding Mahamane Karimou. He was also accredited to East Germany. On 23 January 1985, Alhousseïni Mouloul was appointed his successor.

Harouna was appointed ambassador to Algeria on the same day, succeeding Abdou Garba. He was succeeded as ambassador on 12 May 1988 by Moustapha Tahi. Harouna later served as a member of the national electoral commission for the 1992 constitutional referendum, the 1993 parliamentary elections, and the 1993 presidential elections
