= Barcourgné Courmo =

Nigerien politician (1916–1993)

Barcourgné Courmo (1916 – 16 November 1993) was a Nigerien politician and diplomat. Courmo was Finance Minister and chair of the ruling party politburo in the 1960s, as well as the Foreign Minister of Niger briefly in 1970 under Hamani Diori.

== Early career ==
Courmo was closely involved with Diori during the independence struggle, serving as Secretary General of the PPN from 1946 to 1955. He was of Djerma ethnicity, born in the western city of Say, and attended the elite Ecole William Ponty in Dakar during French Colonial rule.

== Ruling party ==
Serving in a number of local and national posts during the transition from French rule, Courmo became Finance Minister in the PPN administration of 1958, holding that post in the first independent government of 1970. In 1965 he became chair of the PPN politburo, and from 1971 to 1972, first chair of the Nigerien Economic and Social Council (CESOC). A powerful figure, Courmo was one of a handful of Diori's inner circle during the period of one party rule.

== Fall ==
Courmo fell from power in 1972 when he acted in support of an abortive military coup, itself crushed almost immediately by the Nigerien Armed Forces. He was quietly forced into retirement, becoming one of only two members of the PPN politburo to be dropped prior to the 1974 end of the Diori regime.

Preceded by Abdou Sidikou	Foreign Minister of Niger; 1970	Succeeded by Mamdou Maidah
