= Dauda (surname) =

- Language: Hebrew, Arabic, Hausa, Yoruba

Origin
- Origin: Hebrew, later adopted into Arabic and African languages
- Meaning: "Beloved" (original Hebrew meaning)
- Region of origin: West Africa, Middle East

Dauda is a male given name and surname commonly used among West African Muslims, particularly within the Hausa and Yoruba communities. The name is a localized form of the Arabic Dāwūd (داوود), which originates from the Hebrew name Dāwīḏ (דָּוִד), meaning "beloved." The name has deep religious significance in Judaism, Christianity, and Islam, as Dāwūd (David) is recognized as a prophet and king in the Bible and the Qur'an.

Etymology and Linguistic History

Hebrew Origin

The earliest known form of Dauda comes from the Hebrew name Dāwīḏ (דָּוִד), which is derived from the root dwd, meaning "beloved" or "dear one." The name appears as early as the 10th century BCE, referring to King David of Israel, a central figure in the Hebrew Bible (Tanakh).

According to linguist Ernest Klein in A Comprehensive Etymological Dictionary of the Hebrew Language:

> "The name דָּוִד (Dāwīḏ) is derived from the root דּוֹד (dwd), meaning 'beloved' or 'dear one,' and was common among ancient Israelites."

Adoption into Arabic

The Hebrew name Dāwīḏ was later adapted into Arabic as Dāwūd (داوود), likely through Jewish and Christian influences before the rise of Islam. In Islamic tradition, Dāwūd is regarded as a prophet and king, similar to his role in Jewish and Christian scriptures.

Arabic linguistic expert Arthur Jeffery writes in The Foreign Vocabulary of the Qur'an:

> "Dāwūd appears in pre-Islamic Arabic as a borrowing from Hebrew or Aramaic, retaining its phonetic structure while being naturalized in Semitic linguistic patterns."

Spread to West Africa: Hausa and Yoruba Adaptations

Through Islamic expansion into West Africa, the Arabic Dāwūd evolved into Dauda in languages such as Hausa and Yoruba, where it remains widely used today. Islamic scholars and merchants introduced the name along with Islamic teachings, particularly in regions influenced by the Mali Empire, the Songhai Empire, and the Sokoto Caliphate.

Historian John O. Hunwick notes in Religion and National Integration in Africa:

> "Names such as Dauda, originating from Islamic traditions, became common in West Africa due to the spread of Islam and the cultural exchanges between Arab traders and local African communities."

In Hausa culture, Dauda is often associated with leadership and wisdom, while in Yoruba and other West African traditions, it retains its connection to its Arabic and Hebrew roots.

Cultural and Religious Significance

The name Dauda remains significant in Islamic, Christian, and African cultural contexts:

In Islam, Dauda (Dāwūd) is revered as a prophet who received divine guidance.

In Christianity, David (Dāwīḏ) is an important biblical figure, the King of Israel and ancestor of Jesus.

In West African societies, the name has taken on localized pronunciations while maintaining its religious heritage.

== Notable individuals with the name ==
- Abiola Dauda (born 1988), Nigerian footballer.
- Collins Dauda, Ghanaian politician.
- Fatau Dauda, Ghanaian footballer.
- Fuseini Dauda, Ghanaian footballer.
- J. B. Dauda, Sierra Leonean politician.
- Raven Dauda, (born 1973) Canadian writer and actor.
- Dauda Jawara, First Prime Minister and President of The Gambia.
- Abubakar Dauda, Nigerian politician and academic.
- Mohammed Dauda, Ghanaian professional footballer.

See Also

David (name)

Dāwūd

Hausa names

Yoruba names
