= Hassan I University =

Education institution in Settat, Morocco

- President: Jamal Zahi
- Academic staff: 446
- Administrative staff: 245
- Students: 43,280
- Location: 33.029°N 7.616°W

Hassan I University is a public university in Settat, Morocco, founded in 1997.

It is ranked 4th nationally by the "Times Higher Education" World University Rankings in its 2022 edition and 121st in the 2016 regional ranking of Arab universities by U.S. News & World Report.

It is named after Sultan Hassan I.

== Overview ==
Hassan I University comprises the following institutions:

- National School of Commerce and Management of Settat (ENCG)
- Faculty of Languages, Arts and Human Sciences (FLASH)
- Faculty of Law and Political Science (FSJP)
- Faculty of Economics and Management (FEG)
- Faculty of Science and Technology (FST)
- National School of Applied Sciences of Berrechid (ENSA)
- Higher Institute of Health Sciences (ISSS)
- Higher School of Education and Training (ESEF)
- Institute of Sports Science (I2S)
- Multidisciplinary Faculty of Berrechid (FPB)
