= Mohamed Abdoulahi =

Nigerian politician

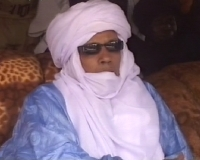
Mohamed Abdoulahi

Mohamed Abdoulahi is a Nigerian politician who served in the government of Niger as minister of mines and energy from 2004 to 2010, under President Mamadou Tandja.

== Political career ==
Abdoulahi was president of the Union for Democracy and Social Progress (UDPS-Amana) from 1992 to 1996. He then joined the Support Committee for Ibrahim Maïnassara Baré (COSIMBA) and Maïnassara's ruling party, the Rally for Democracy and Progress (RDP-Jama'a). Later, following Maïnassara's assassination, Abdoulahi became a technical adviser to Prime Minister Hama Amadou and joined the ruling National Movement for the Development of Society (MNSD) in 2004; in the December 2004 parliamentary election, he was elected to the National Assembly as an MNSD candidate.

Abdoulahi served only briefly in the National Assembly before being appointed to the government as minister of mines and energy on 30 December 2004. He remained in that position in the government formed on 9 June 2007 under Prime Minister Seyni Oumarou.
