= André Salifou =

Nigerian politician (1942–2022)

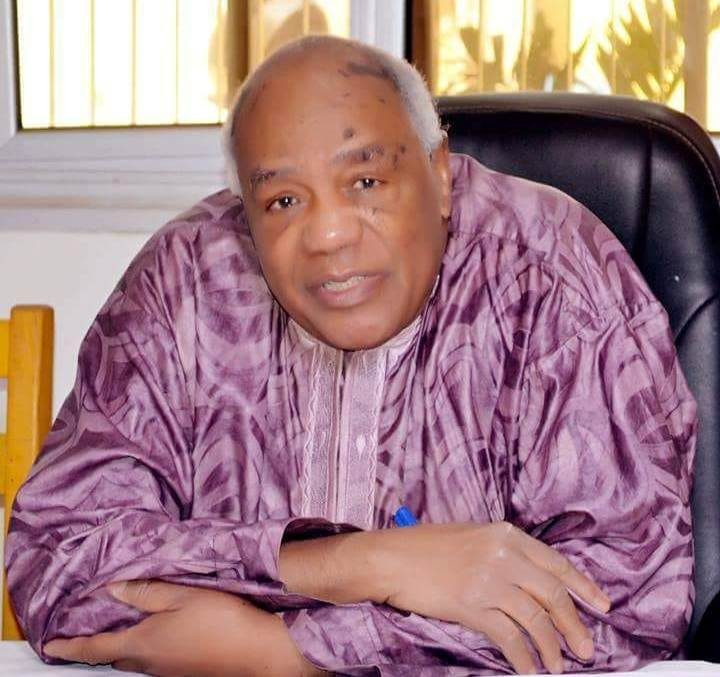
Image of Pr Andre Salifou

André Salifou (1942 – 14 May 2022) was a Nigerian politician, diplomat, and professor. He was president of the High Council of the Republic during the 1991–93 transitional period, briefly served as Minister of Foreign Affairs in 1996, and was an unsuccessful presidential candidate in 1999.

== Biography ==
Salifou was born in Zinder. From 1972 to 1979, he worked for the Agency of Cultural and Technical Cooperation (Agence de Coopération Culturelle et Technique), UNESCO, and the Common African and Mauritian Organization. He then became a professor of history at the University of Niamey until 1991. For his doctorate d'état, he wrote the thesis Colonisation et sociétés indigènes au Niger de la fin du XIXe siècle à la début de la Seconde Guerre mondiale (Colonization and indigenous societies of Niger from the end of the 19th century to the beginning of the Second World War). He died on May 14, 2022, at the age of 80.

== Political career ==
=== Role in the National Conference and High Council of the Republic ===
At the end of the 1980s, the military regime of Brigadier General Ali Saibou came under increasing domestic pressure and civil resistance. At the end of 1990, the regime acquiesced to demands for a return to civilian rule and a national conference was convened in July 1991 to prepare the way for the adoption of a new constitution and the holding of free and fair elections. Professor Salifou was chosen as a neutral figure to be president of the Presidium of the National Conference, which was held from July 29, 1991, to November 3, 1991 and established a transitional government leading to democratic elections. At the Conference, André Salifou was elected as president of the High Council of the Republic, which was created to function in a legislative role during the transitional period, which lasted from November 1991 to April 1993. In late February 1992, he was briefly kidnapped, along with the Interior Minister, Mohamed Moussa, by soldiers demanding back pay; he and Moussa were freed after the soldiers were promised that they would receive their pay.

=== Opposition politician ===
In the February 1993 parliamentary election, Salifou was a candidate for his party, the Union of Democratic and Progressive Patriots (UPDP-Chamoua), in the Zinder constituency, and was elected to the National Assembly. Like Prime Minister Ahmadou Cheiffou, he was prohibited by the National Conference from standing as a candidate in the presidential election held later in the same month due to his role as president of the High Council of the Republic. Following the election, the UPDP, which was led by Salifou, formed part of the opposition along with the National Movement for the Development of Society (MNSD). Salifou participated in an opposition protest on April 16, 1994, and was arrested along with 90 others, including MNSD leader Tandja Mamadou.

=== Under military rule ===
After Ibrahim Baré Maïnassara seized power in a military coup on January 27, 1996, Salifou was appointed Minister of State in charge of Higher Education and Research in the new transitional government named on February 1. Three months later, on May 5, Salifou was instead named Minister of State in charge of Foreign Relations. He left this position in December 1996, when he was moved to the post of Minister of State in charge of relations with the Assemblies; he remained in the latter position until December 1997.

=== Return to democracy ===
In late August 1999, Salifou announced that he would run as the UPDP candidate in the October 1999 presidential election. In the election, he placed sixth with 2.08% of the vote.

After the 1999 election, Salifou acted in a diplomatic role for international organizations. He was special envoy of La Francophonie to the Comoros; on March 15, 2001, the Comoran opposition alleged that Salifou, together with the French ambassador, had been secretly working against the presence of the Organization of African Unity in the Comoros. Later, on April 30, 2002, Salifou was named special envoy of OAU Secretary-General Amara Essy to Madagascar.

Salifou was appointed by President Tandja as his special representative to La Francophonie, and he was included in the Nigerien delegation to La Francophonie's ninth summit, held in Beirut in October 2002. He also headed an African Union mission to the Central African Republic in November 2002, meeting with Central African President Ange-Félix Patassé on November 19 to discuss "the conditions for the restoration of peace in the CAR". On February 13, 2003, he was designated as the special representative of Essy, who was by this time the interim chairman of the commission of the African Union, to Côte d'Ivoire.

After Mahamadou Issoufou took office as president, he appointed Salifou as special adviser to the president, with the rank of minister, on 20 April 2011. Salifou held that post concurrently with his role as the president's personal representative to La Francophonie.

Preceded by Mohamed Bazoum	Foreign Minister of Niger; May 1996 - December 1996	Succeeded by Ibrahim Hassane Mayaki
