= Mamadou Maidah =

Nigerien politician (1924–2005)

Mamadou Maidah (1924 – 4 November 2005) was a Nigerien politician and diplomat. Mamadou was the Foreign Minister of Niger from 1963 to 1965, and a leading member of the ruling PPN-RDA party.

Mamadou—his surname—was born in Tessaoua in 1924, the child of local Hausa aristocratic family, whose father was a Marabout (religious leader) and one time head of the Tessaoua local council under French colonial rule. Maidah became a teacher at Katibougou Teachers College, Kati, Mali (then French Soudan). He served in the French Armed Forces from 1946 to 1947, and taught in Niger until 1958. In 1959 he was elected to the consultative Nigerien National Assembly from Tessaoua from Hamani Diori's PPN-RDA. He became Niger's first Minister of Agriculture from 1959 to 1961. From 1961 to 1963, he was Minister of Education, Minister of Rural Economy from 1963 to 1970, and Foreign Minister of Niger from July 1970 to 1972. Thereafter he served as Minister of Information until the 1974 Nigerien coup d'état. While a marginal figure in government decision making, Mamadou's very public roles owed much to his background in Hausa society in a government dominated by political leaders from the Zarma and Songhay of the west of Niger.

Following the Military seizure of power, Mamadou was arrested, charged—but never convicted—with the embezzlement of 7 million CFA francs and fraud involving some 18 million more. He remained under house arrest until 1976, when many former political leaders were released by the military with the stipulation that they refrained from political activity.

Preceded by Barcourgné Courmo	Foreign Minister of Niger; July 1970 – 1972	Succeeded by Boukary Sabo
