= Ide Oumarou =

Nigerien diplomat, government minister and journalist

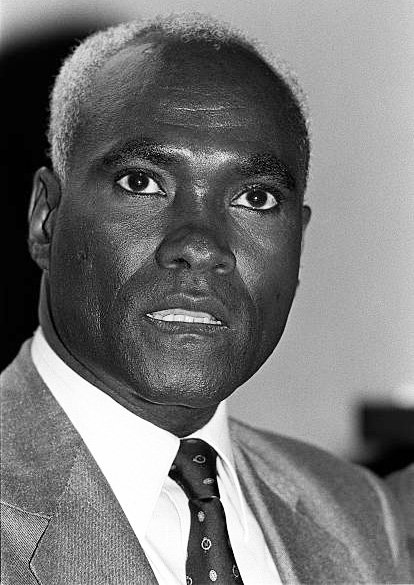

5th Secretary-general of the Organization of African Unity
- In office 20 July 1985 – 19 September 1989
- Preceded by: Peter Onu
- Succeeded by: Salim Ahmed Salim

Personal details
- Born: 1937
- Died: 12 February 2002 (aged 64–65)

Ide Oumarou (1937 – 12 February 2002) was a Nigerien diplomat, government minister, and journalist. He served as ambassador to the United Nations between 1980 and 1983. He then served as the foreign minister between 1983 and 1985 and was secretary-general of the Organisation of African Unity between 1985 and 1988. He was educated at the Ecole William Ponty in Dakar and IHEOM in Paris. He was an editor and journalist at the Niger Ministry of Information, serving as editor of state paper Le Niger from 1961 to 1963. He became director general of Information from 1963 to 1972, and then became director of Posts and Telecommunication for the Ministry. Following the 1974 Nigerien Coup d'état, he became cabinet chief and assistant to Military Head of State Seyni Kountche, becoming a particularly close adviser.

In July 1988, Oumarou was nominated to serve a second term as OAU General Secretary, but lost to Tanzania's Salim Salim. After the death of Kountche, Oumarou became a cabinet adviser to new president, General Ali Saibou, who appointed him a Minister of State without portfolio. Also a successful author, Oumarou's first book, entitled Gros Plan, won the 1978 Grand Prix Litteraire d' Afrique Francaise.

Political offices
Preceded by Daouda Diallo	Foreign Minister of Niger; 1983–1985	Succeeded by Mahamane Sani Bako
