= Amadou Issaka =

Nigerien politician (1924–2004)

Minister of Public Service and Labor
- In office 23 November 1965 – 1974

Minister of Justice
- In office 15 January 1970 – 22 November 1970

Minister Delegate at the Presidential Office
- In office 22 November 1970 – 17 August 1972

Minister of Economy, Trade and Industry
- In office 17 August 1972 – 1974

Personal details
- Born: 1924 Kantché, Niger
- Died: November 14, 2004 Kantché, Niger
- Party: Nigerien Progressive Party
- Occupation: Politician, traditional leader
- Awards: Officer of the National Order of Niger

Amadou Issaka (born 1924 in Kantché; died November 14, 2004, also in Kantché) was a Nigerien politician.

== Life ==
Amadou Issaka was a member of the Nigerien Progressive Party. In 1954, he was appointed chief of the canton of his hometown, Kantche. From 1958 to 1959, he was a member of the Grand Council of French, West Africa. On November 23, 1965, Issaka was appointed Minister of Public Service and Labor in the Nigerien government, where he served until 1974. Starting January 15, 1970, he served as Minister of Justice, from November 22, 1970, as Minister Delegate at the Presidential Office, and from August 17, 1972, as Minister of Economy, Trade, and Industry.

After the coup d’état by Seyni Kountché on April 15, 1974, Amadou Issaka was removed from his positions as minister and canton chief and was imprisoned in the military camp in Agadez. Unlike most of the other former ministers, he was released from prison as early as August 2, 1975, and was reinstated as the canton chief of Kantché. He was also a member of the Council of Elders, which was convened in 1996 after the coup d’état by Ibrahim Baré Maïnassara.

== Honors ==
- Officer of the National Order of Niger
