= Hassoumi Massaoudou =

Nigerien politician (born 1957)

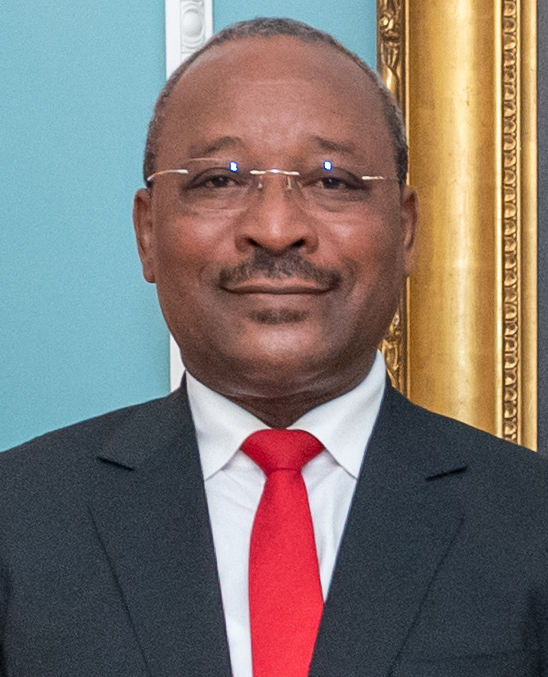
- Massaoudou in 2022

Minister of Foreign Affairs
- In office 3 April 2021 – 26 July 2023
- President: Mohamed Bazoum
- Preceded by: Kalla Ankourao
- Succeeded by: Bakary Yaou Sangaré

Personal details
- Born: 22 October 1957 (age 68) Birni N'Gaouré, French West Africa
- Party: Independent
- Other political affiliations: PNDS-Tarayya
- Occupation: Politician

Hassoumi Massaoudou (born 22 October 1957) is a Nigerien politician who served as minister of Foreign Affairs of Niger from 2021 to 2023 and as minister of Finance from October 2016 to January 2019. A leading member of the Nigerien Party for Democracy and Socialism (PNDS-Tarayya), he was minister of Communication, Culture, Youth and Sports from 1993 to 1994, president of the PNDS Parliamentary Group from 1999 to 2004, director of the Cabinet of the President from 2011 to 2013, minister of the Interior from 2013 to 2016, and minister of National Defense in 2016.

Following the 2023 coup d'état, Massaoudou did not recognize the new administration and instead declared himself head of state and government.

== Political career ==
Massaoudou was a founding member of the PNDS, a party created under the leadership of Mahamadou Issoufou in 1990. When the party held its Constitutive General Assembly on 23–24 December 1990, Massaoudou was designated as its Secretary for Information and Propaganda. Following Niger's first multiparty elections in 1993, a coalition government headed by Mahamadou Issoufou was named on 23 April 1993; it included Massaoudou as Minister of Communication, Culture, Youth and Sports. He served in that position until Prime Minister Issoufou resigned in late September 1994 and the PNDS left the ruling coalition, with a new government being named on 5 October 1994.

Following the military coup led by Ibrahim Baré Maïnassara on 27 January 1996, Massaoudou was arrested on 13 July 1996 and tortured while in detention, with mock executions being used.

Massaoudou was elected to the National Assembly in the November 1999 parliamentary election and served as President of the PNDS Parliamentary Group during the parliamentary term that followed. As of 2004, he was the First Deputy Secretary-General of the PNDS.

Regarding President Mamadou Tandja's 2009 efforts to create a new constitution that would remove presidential term limits, Massaoudou said that Tandja had lost his legitimacy, and that the opposition would "treat him as a mere putschist". He told the press on 1 June 2009, that Tandja was attempting the "demolition of democratic institutions". He also said that "simultaneous giant rallies across the country" would be held on 7 June to oppose Tandja's planned constitutional referendum.

Massaoudou headed Issoufou's campaign for the January–March 2011 presidential election. Issoufou won the election and took office as President on 7 April 2011; on the same day, he appointed Massaoudou as Director of the Cabinet of the President, with the rank of Minister.

Massaoudou served as Director of the Cabinet for over two years before being appointed to the government as Minister of the Interior, Public Security, Decentralization, and Customary and Religious Affairs on 13 August 2013. After Issoufou was sworn in for a second term, Massaoudou was moved to the post of Minister of National Defense on 11 April 2016. Six months later, on 19 October 2016, he was again moved, this time to the post of Minister of Finance.

In the wake of the 2023 Nigerien coup d'état, Hassoumi Massaoudou remained loyal to President Mohamed Bazoum and denounced the military junta that overthrew him. On 27 July, he declared himself acting head of state, substituting for Bazoum, and called on all democrats to "make this adventure fail".

In late 2024, the junta began prosecuting Massaoudou and fellow minister Alkache Alhada in military court for alleged treason. The junta leader, Abdourahamane Tiani, stripped Massaoudou, Alhada and five others of their Nigerien nationality. The state accused these individuals of planting bombs and supporting terrorism, among other accusations. Tiani stated that the denaturalization would be temporary.
