= Hassane Barazé Moussa =

Nigerien politician

Minister of Post and New Information Technologies
- Incumbent
- Assumed office 2021

Hassane Barazé Moussa is a Nigerien politician. He was previously Minister of Mines in Niger from 19 October 2016. He participated in 2020, for the first time, in the presidential elections.

== Career ==
Since 2021, he has been Minister of Post and Telecommunications of Niger.
