= Daouda Marté =

Nigerien politician

Daouda Mamadou Marté (born 23 November 1959) is a Nigerien politician. A leading member of the Nigerien Party for Democracy and Socialism (PNDS-Tarayya), he has been the First Vice-president of the National Assembly of Niger since 2011.

== Life and career ==
Born in Diffa in 1959, Marté was a founding member of the PNDS; when the party held its Constitutive General Assembly on 23–24 December 1990, he was designated as its Deputy Treasurer. At the PNDS Fourth Ordinary Congress in September 2004, he was designated as Seventh Deputy Secretary-General. He retained that post at the Fifth Ordinary Congress, held on 18 July 2009.

In the January 2011 parliamentary election, Marté was elected to the National Assembly as a PNDS candidate. When the National Assembly began meeting for its parliamentary term, Marté was elected as First Vice-president of the National Assembly on 20 April 2011.

He was re-elected to the National Assembly in the February 2016 parliamentary election.
