= Mahamadou Halilou Sabbo =

Nigerien politician and writer

- Born: Tahoua
- Died: 16 December 2006
- Citizenship: Nigerien
- Occupations: Politician, writer
- Notable work: Les Nouvelles Ed. Africaines, Dakar 1978. Presses de l'Imprimerie Nationale du Niger, Niamey 1981. Les Nouvelles Ed. Africaines, Dakar 1990, ISBN 2-85069-652-8 .

Mahamadou Halilou Sabbo (born in Tahoua, 1937 and died 16 December 2006) was a Nigerien politician and writer.

== Life and work ==
Mahamadou Halilou Sabbo worked as an assistant primary school teacher from 1957 and as a primary school teacher from 1963. After two years of training at the École normale supérieure in Abidjan, he became a primary school inspector in 1971. He was a member of the government of Niger during the regime of the Supreme Military Council under Seyni Kountché. He served as Secretary of State for Education from December 12, 1977. He then became Minister of Information on September 10, 1979, and finally Minister of Justice on June 14, 1982. He left the government on January 24, 1983. Halilou Sabbo then headed the Office National d'Edition et de Presse (ONEP), which publishes the state-run print media Le Sahel and Sahel Dimanche , as well as the state Institute for Documentation, Research and Pedagogy. In 1996, he served as an advisor to President Ibrahim Baré Maïnassara.

As a writer, Mahamadou Halilou Sabbo is best known for his novels Aboki ou L'appel de la côte (1978) and Caprices du destin (1981). Aboki is about the migrant worker Amadou, who spends twenty years in the Ivory Coast until he returns to Niger after political conflicts and being wounded. In Caprices du destin, the education system in Niger and the distrust of the population towards it are addressed. Halilou Sabbo also wrote the play Gomma! Adorable Gomma! (1990). His writings are in French and his interest in the national languages of Niger was expressed in the fact that he incorporated numerous Hausa proverbs translated into French into his works.

== Works ==
- Aboki ou L'appel de la côte [Aboki, or the call of the coast]. Les Nouvelles Ed. Africaines, Dakar 1978.
- Caprices du destin [Whims of fate]. Presses de l'Imprimerie Nationale du Niger, Niamey 1981.
- Gomma! Adorable Gomma!. Les Nouvelles Ed. Africaines, Dakar 1990, ISBN 2-85069-652-8 .

== Literature ==
- Jean-Dominique Pénel, Amadou Maïlélé: . Volume III: Mahamadou Halidou Sabbo, Diouldé Laya, André Salifou, Mamane Maïdou, Diado Amadou, Abdoua Kanta, Yacou Karanta, Mamane Sani, Salif Dago, Moussa Mahamadou, Kangaï Seyni Maïga. L'Harmattan, Paris 2010, ISBN 978-2-296-12860-6, chap. Halidou Sabbo Mahamadou , p. 11–36 .
