= Cabinet of Niger =

The Cabinet of Niger (officially referred to as the Council of Ministers of the Republic of Niger) is made up of the appointed heads of Niger's government Ministries. Ministers are chosen from the elected members of the National Assembly of Niger. According to the Constitution of 18 July 1999 (the Fifth Republic) the Prime Minister of Niger proposes the membership of the Council of Ministers, and the President of Niger appoints the Ministers, which is then authorized by the National Assembly. The Council of ministers meets at the discretion of the President, advises him on policy, and implements the policies he formulates. The Council of Ministers is headed by the Prime Minister of Niger, whose name is put forward by the National Assembly, and accepted by the President. The Assembly may remove the Prime minister by a vote of no confidence.

== Current government ==
- Djibo Bakary (1957-1958)
- Hamani Diori (1958-1965)
- Hamani Diori (1965-1970)
- Hamani Diori (1970-1974)
- Seyni Kountché (1974-1983)
- Hama Amadou (2000-2001)
- Hama Amadou (2001-2002)
- Hama Amadou (2002-2004)
- Hama Amadou (2004-2007)
- Seyni Oumarou (2007-2010)
- Mahamadou Danda (2010-2011)
- Brigi Rafini (2011-2021)
- Ouhoumoudou Mahamadou (2021-2023)
- Ali Lamine Zeine (since 2023)

On 10 August 2023, the National Council for the Safeguard of the Homeland (CNSP) announced a new cabinet, naming 21 ministers led by Prime Minister Ali Lamine Zeine. Three generals who were members of the CNSP junta were named to head the interior, defense and sports ministries.

== 2021–2023 ==
Ouhoumoudou Mahamadou's Government was formed in 2021, and was overthrown in the 2023 Nigerien coup d'état.

== 2004–2009 ==
Following the 2004 parliamentary election, no single party had a majority in the National Assembly. The MNSD-Nassara, with 47 of the 113 seats—as well as the Presidency—formed a coalition government headed by Prime Minister Hama Amadou. To support this government, some seats in the Council of Ministers were held by other parties. When Hama Amadou was forced from office in June 2007, much of the personnel in the Council changed, although the same parties were represented. Minor changes were made in 2008, but in May 2009, in response to their parties' opposition to a proposed referendum to allow the President to seek a third term, the three members of RDP-Jama'a and ANDP-Zaman Lahiya were replaced with ministers drawn from the MNSD-Nassara. With the continued support of the CDS-Rahama, the MNSD maintained a working majority of 67 seats in the 113 seat National Assembly.

On 28 May 2009, the President of Niger, Mamadou Tandja, dismissed the National Assembly over his plans to hold a constitutional referendum, but retained the Council of Ministers and government of the Prime Minister. On 25 June, following a statement by Minister of Communication Ben Omar demanding the Constitutional Court of Niger rescind a ruling which stopped such a referendum, the CDS announced its final break with the MNSD government. The party withdrew from the government coalition and pulled its eight members from the Council of Ministers, including the Minister of Defense, the Minister of Health, and the Minister of Youth and Sport. In a statement, the CDS demanded the President definitively submit to the Court's decision. On 29 June the government announced seven of the eight CDS ministers had resigned, with the CDS Minister of Defense, Djida Hamadou, choosing to remain in the government.

== Government Seyni Kountché ==
The Seyni Kountché government is a Nigerien government formed on

== Initial composition ==
1. President of the Supreme Military Council, Minister of the Interior, Minister of National Defense: Lieutenant Colonel Seyni Kountché
2. Minister of National Education, Youth and Sports: Colonel Dupuis Henri Yacouba
3. Minister of the Interior, Minister of Mines and Hydraulics: Battalion Chief Sani Souna Sido
4. Minister of Public Service and Labor: Battalion Chief Idrissa Arouna
5. Minister of Justice: Battalion Chief Sory Mamadou Diallo
6. Minister of Finance: military intendant Moussa Tondi
7. Minister of Foreign Affairs and Cooperation: Captain Moumouni Djermakoye Adamou
8. Minister of rural economy, climate and population aid: Captain Ali Saïbou
9. Minister of Public Health and Social Affairs: Captain Moussa Sala
10. Minister of Public Works, Transport and Urbanization: Captain Bayéré Moussa
11. Minister of Posts and Telecommunications, Minister of Information: Lieutenant Gabriel Cyrille

== Evolution of composition ==
The new government was initially entirely composed of soldiers (a colonel, a lieutenant-colonel, three battalion commanders, an intendant, five captains and a lieutenant) whose average age did not exceed thirty-five years. Civilians are initially excluded from the government because they are accused of “corruption, injustice, selfishness and indifference towards the people” .

Lieutenant-Colonel Kountché multiplies the functions by assuming the presidency of the supreme council, the office of head of state, the functions of minister of national defense and depending on the reshuffles the portfolios of the Interior and development. The super-ministry of rural economy, climate and aid to populations is entrusted to the cousin of Lieutenant Colonel Kountché, Captain Ali Saïbou. The Ministry of the Interior and the strategic Ministry of Mines are entrusted to the regime's number two, battalion chief Sani Souna Sido .

The provisional military government was completed on June 8 by four civilian technocrats who entered the government as secretaries of state:

- Alou Harouna, administrative director becomes Secretary of State for the Interior,
- Annou Mahaman, doctor of economic sciences, chief of staff, then secretary general at the Ministry of Rural Economy, Climate and Population Assistance since the end of April, is promoted to Secretary of State in this ministry,
- Mounkeila Arouna, graduate in economic sciences from the University of Dakar, becomes Secretary of State for Development,
- Alfidja Abderrahmane is appointed Secretary of State for Cooperation .

On November 30, the government was reshuffled. Ibrahim Loutou, holder of a doctorate in law and economics , and Garba Sidikou join the government respectively as Secretary of State at the Presidency in charge of Information and Secretary of State at the Presidency in charge of Youth and sports .

The reshuffle of June 3, 1975 saw the departure of two soldiers. Captain Ali Saibou is appointed chief of staff and responsible for aid to the populations. Captain Gabriel Cyrille is relieved of his duties for gross indiscipline .

On February 21, 1976, the government became majority made up of civilians, the first time since the coup d'état . Four civilians join the government, including two ministers: the magistrate Mamadou Mallam Aouami is appointed minister of justice, the general engineer of public works Moussa Bako is appointed minister of public works, transport and urban planning, the journalist Daouda Diallo is appointed Secretary of State at the Presidency in charge of information and the agronomist Brah Mahamane, is appointed Secretary of State for rural development . The number of soldiers fell from 10 to 7 following the departures of Colonel Dupuis Henri Yacouba, Battalion Chief Sani Souna Sido and Captain Bayéré Moussa .

Mahamadou Alilou was appointed Secretary of State for National Education on June 7, 1976 .

On December 12, 1977, a civilian ( Yahaya Tounkara ) and two soldiers (squadron leader Boulama Manga, battalion leader Moumouni Djermakoye Adamou ) entered the government.

On September 5, 1978, Commander Idriss Arouna left office .

== See also ==
- List of Government ministers of Niger in 2009
- 2023 Nigerien Crisis
