= Dauda (given name) =

- Gender: Male
- Language: Multiple

Origin
- Origin: Africa, ultimately derived from Arabic

Dauda is a masculine given name of West African origin. It is derived from the name of the Islamic prophet Dawud. Notable people with the name include:

== Given name ==
- Dauda (sultan), Nigerian sultan
- Dauda Abasama I, Nigerian sultan
- Dauda Abasama II, Nigerian sultan
- Dauda Soroye Adegbenro (1909–1975), Nigerian politician
- Dauda Kako Are (born 1959), Nigerian accountant and politician
- Dauda Biu (1964–2026), Nigerian civil servant
- Dauda Bortu (born 1996), Liberian footballer
- Dauda Danladi (born 1957), Nigerian diplomat
- Dauda Epo-Akara (1943–2005), Nigerian musician
- Dauda Iddrisa (born 2008), Italian footballer
- Dauda Izobo (born 1980), Nigerian boxer
- Dauda Kamara (died 2024), Sierra Leonean politician
- Dauda Musa Komo (1959–2025), Nigerian Army officer and politician
- Dauda Lawal (born 1965), Nigerian politician and banker
