= Ouled Slimane people =

Arab people in Niger

The Ouled Slimane (also spelled Oulad Souleymane or Awlad Suleiman) are an Arab people and tribe originating from the Fezzan region of modern-day Libya. Populations of Ouled Slimanes are also present in Chad and eastern Niger.

Since the early 19th century, they joined the Magarha, Warfalla and the Qadhadhfa to form the Saff al-Fauqi alliance, which opposed the Saff al-Bahar. With the fall of the Karamanli Dynasty, the Oualad Suleiman reached the height of their power in the late 1830s. However, in the 1840s, after conflicts with the Ottomans, many decided to leave Libya and flee to Chad, where the surrounding states such as Wadai and Bornu were far weaker than the Ottoman Empire. Between the Tibesti Mountains and Lake Chad, they raided caravans belonging to the Tuareg, Kanem, and Daza, and allied with the Qadiwa and Toubou people.

The Oualad Suleiman became one of the most powerful tribal groups in the region because of their horsemanship instead of their usage of camels, allowing for rapid and repeated raids. Suleiman horses could go much faster than camels and could be maneuvered easier, though they lacked the endurance of camels. Because of this, the Oualad Suleiman employed both camels and horses in their raids - they used camels for long-distance riding, and mounted their horses within striking distance of villages or caravans.

The Ouled Slimane still living in Fezzan were brutally massacred and expelled by the Italians during the Pacification, leading to an exodus to the French colonies of Niger and Chad. In Niger and Chad the Ouled Slimane forged good relations with the French colonial authorities, especially after the end of World War II until the independence of the African countries in 1960, however they maintained hostile relations with other populations such as the Toubou or the Tuareg.

After Gaddafi's rise, the Libyan leader encouraged the Ouled Slimane to return to their former home in Fezzan, becoming one of the pillars of the regime in its first decades at the local level. However, this would change in the last decades of Gaddafi's government, causing a growing rivalry between the Ouled Slimane and the Gaddafa, the tribe to which the Libyan leader belonged.

After the civil war, the Ouled Slimane have made human trafficking one of their main sources of income, controlling part of the slave market that passes through Sabha, where they maintain rivalry with the Toubou and Tuareg traffickers.

== Notable Ouled Slimane people ==
- Mohamed Bazoum – President of Niger 2021–2023.
