= Dupuis Henry Yacouba =

Nigerien general and politician

Henri Dupuis-Yacouba

Minister of Education, Youth and Sports
- In office 1974–1975

Minister of Justice, Post and Telecommunications
- In office 1975–1976

Personal details
- Born: March 1, 1924 Timbuktu, French Sudan
- Died: January 28, 2008 (aged 83) Niamey, Niger
- Occupation: Soldier, Politician
- Awards: Grand Chancellor of the National Orders

Military service
- Allegiance: Niger
- Branch/service: Niger Armed Forces
- Years of service: 1943–1986
- Rank: Major General
- Commands: Niger Armed Forces

Dupuis Henry Yacouba (March 1, 1924 – January 28, 2008) was a Nigerien general and politician.

== Life ==
Dupuis Henry Yacouba was the son of the Frenchman Auguste Dupuis-Yacouba and his wife, Salama, who belonged to the Fulani (Fulbe) people. He was drafted into the French Armed Forces in 1943 and was promoted to captain in Niamey in 1956. After Niger gained independence from France in 1960 and the Nigerien Armed Forces were established in 1961, Dupuis-Yacouba, like Seyni Kountché, was one of only six Nigerien military personnel to have reached officer rank. In 1963, he was promoted to major. From December 1961 to August 1966, Dupuis-Yacouba served as personnel director in the Nigerien Ministry of Defense, and also as chief of staff to the Minister of Defense from December 1962 to August 1966. He later worked in the ministry as Director of National Defense and, from July 1973, also as Inspector General of the Armed Forces.

Seyni Kountché came to power on April 15, 1974, through a military coup and appointed Henri Dupuis-Yacouba, who had only been passively involved in the coup, as Minister of Education, Youth, and Sports. In a government reshuffle in 1975, he initially lost the Youth and Sports portfolios, and in another reshuffle later that same year, he became Minister of Justice, Post, and Telecommunications. His personal ambition was considered the reason why he was excluded from the government in February 1976. He played a minor role in an attempted coup against head of state Kountché in March 1976. He was appointed brigadier general in August 1976. He was the first general in the history of the Nigerien Armed Forces. In 1981, he was promoted to major general. Dupuis-Yacouba also served as Grand Chancellor of the National Orders from 1976 to 1986. He retired on January 1, 1986.
