= Abdou Sidikou =

Nigerien diplomat, politician (1927–1973)

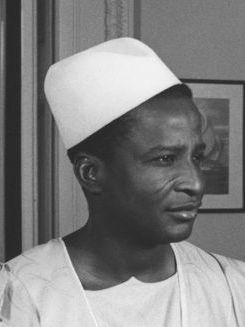
Abdou Sidikou, 1962

Abdou Sidikou (1927 – 26 July 1973) was a Nigerien politician and diplomat. Sidikou was the foreign minister of Niger from 1967 to 1970 under Hamani Diori.

== Early life ==
Abdou—his surname—was born in Kouré, Niger in 1927. Under French colonial rule he was son of an appointed local chief, or Chef du Canton, educated at the elite École normale supérieure William Ponty in Dakar and later studied medicine at the Paris Faculty of Medicine, graduating in 1956, and working first at the Hospital of the Seine in Paris, and then becoming chief Pharmacist at National Hospital (Niamey)

== Government career ==
In 1959, Abdou was appointed Cabinet director to Niger's first minister of health Diallo Boubakar, and in 1962 was appointed Ambassador of Niger to the United States, Canada, and the United Nations. In 1964 he moved to Germany, where he was Niger's ambassador to West Germany, Austria, the Benelux and Scandinavian nations, and the European Economic Community. He became secretary to the minister of foreign affairs in Niamey, and on 14 April 1967, took over the ministry from President Hamani Diori. Due to poor health, he was appointed as "Secretary of State to the President" in January 1970, at that time a cabinet-level post. He died 26 July 1973.

| Preceded by Hamani Diori | Foreign Minister of Niger; 1967-1970 | Succeeded by Barcourgné Courmo |
