= Oumarou Sidikou =

Nigerien politician (c. 1936–2005)

Oumarou Sidikou (1937? – April 5, 2005) was a Nigerien politician. He was Vice-Governor of the Central Bank of West African States (BCEAO) from 1988 to 1993. He was a member of the National Movement for the Development of Society (MNSD) and, following the January 1995 parliamentary election, which was won by an alliance that included the MNSD, Sidikou was appointed as Minister of State in charge of Industrial Development, Trade, the Craft Industry, and Tourism in the government of Prime Minister Hama Amadou on February 25, 1995. This government was ousted in a military coup on January 27, 1996.

Sidikou is the father of Fatouma, Aïssa, Aboubakar, Hadizatou, Balkissa, Amadou, Ali, Rokhaya and Mohamed.

Sidikou was elected to the National Assembly in the November 1999 parliamentary election as an MNSD candidate in Tillabéri Department, and in the parliamentary term that followed he served as President of the MNSD Parliamentary Group and President of the Finance Commission. He was re-elected to the National Assembly in the December 2004 parliamentary election and became the First Vice-president of the National Assembly, but he died in a hospital in Morocco in April 2005.
