= Amadou Cissé (politician) =

Nigerien Prime Minister

Prime Minister of Niger
- In office 21 December 1996 – 27 November 1997
- Preceded by: Boukary Adji
- Succeeded by: Ibrahim Hassane Mayaki
- In office 8 February 1995 – 21 February 1995
- Preceded by: Souley Abdoulaye
- Succeeded by: Hama Amadou

Personal details
- Born: 29 June 1948 (age 78)
- Party: Union for Democracy and the Republic (since 1999)

Amadou Boubacar Cissé (born 29 June 1948) is a Nigerien politician. He served as the Prime Minister of Niger on two occasions, from 8 to 21 February 1995 and again from 21 December 1996 to 27 November 1997. He has led a political party, the Union for Democracy and the Republic (UDR-Tabbat) since 1999. He was appointed as Minister of State for Planning in 2011.

== Political career ==
Cissé, a member of the Fula ethnic group, was born in Niamey. He began working for the World Bank in 1982, initially in Niger, but beginning in 1983 he was based in Washington, D.C., in the United States. At the World Bank he was in charge of its central African operations, dealing with structural adjustment programs and assistance.

Following the January 1995 parliamentary election, won by an alliance of the National Movement for the Development of Society (MNSD) and the Nigerien Party for Democracy and Socialism (PNDS), the parliamentary majority was composed of opponents of President Mahamane Ousmane. Rather than submit three names to Ousmane, from which he would choose the Prime Minister, the majority put forward Hama Amadou as its only candidate. Rejecting this, Ousmane chose Cissé as Prime Minister. Like Amadou, Cissé was a member of the MNSD, but his appointment was rejected by the parliamentary majority, and the MNSD promptly expelled him from the party for taking the position. After two weeks, Ousmane appointed Hama Amadou as Prime Minister, replacing Cissé, who had lost a censure motion on February 20, with 43 deputies supporting the motion and 40 opposing it. Opponents of the motion said that it was unconstitutional because Cissé had not yet formed a government.

Following a coup against Ousmane in January 1996, led by Ibrahim Baré Maïnassara, Cissé was named Minister of State for the Economy, Finances and Planning in August 1996. On December 21, 1996, he was named Prime Minister again. He was named vice-chairman of the ruling party, the Rally for Democracy and Progress (RDP), on August 20, 1997, at the party's national congress. On November 24, 1997, his government was dismissed by Maïnassara, who appointed Ibrahim Hassane Mayaki to replace Cissé as Prime Minister.

Following Maïnassara's assassination in April 1999, Cissé announced his intention to run in the October 1999 presidential election, and for this he was expelled from the RDP under party president Hamid Algabid on July 18, 1999. Physical fighting broke out at the RDP headquarters between supporters and opponents of Cissé, leading to intervention by the police. His faction of the RDP nominated him as its presidential candidate on August 1, and he was the first announced candidacy in the election, but the other faction of the party backed the candidacy of Algabid, and it was left to the Court of State to judge which of the two could run as the RDP candidate. The Court accepted Algabid's candidacy and rejected Cissé's candidacy on September 3. On September 12, Cissé created a new party, the Union for Democracy and the Republic (UDR), as a split from the RDP.

=== Events since 2009 ===
Boubacar Cissé was prominent in the opposition to Mamadou Tandja's short lived 6th Republic of 2009–2010, being named chief of delegation by the multiparty CFDR opposition front during the ECOWAS brokered crisis talks with the government. His UDR-Tabbat was expected to compete in the 2011 presidential and parliamentary elections.

After Mahamadou Issoufou won the January–March 2011 presidential election and took office as president on 7 April 2011, Cissé was appointed to the government as Minister of State for Planning, Regional Development, and Community Development on 21 April 2011.

Political offices
Preceded by Souley Abdoulaye	Prime Minister of Niger; 1995	Succeeded by Hama Amadou
Preceded by Boukary Adji	Prime Minister of Niger; 1996–1997	Succeeded by Ibrahim Hassane Mayaki
