= Kalla Ankourao =

Nigerien politician

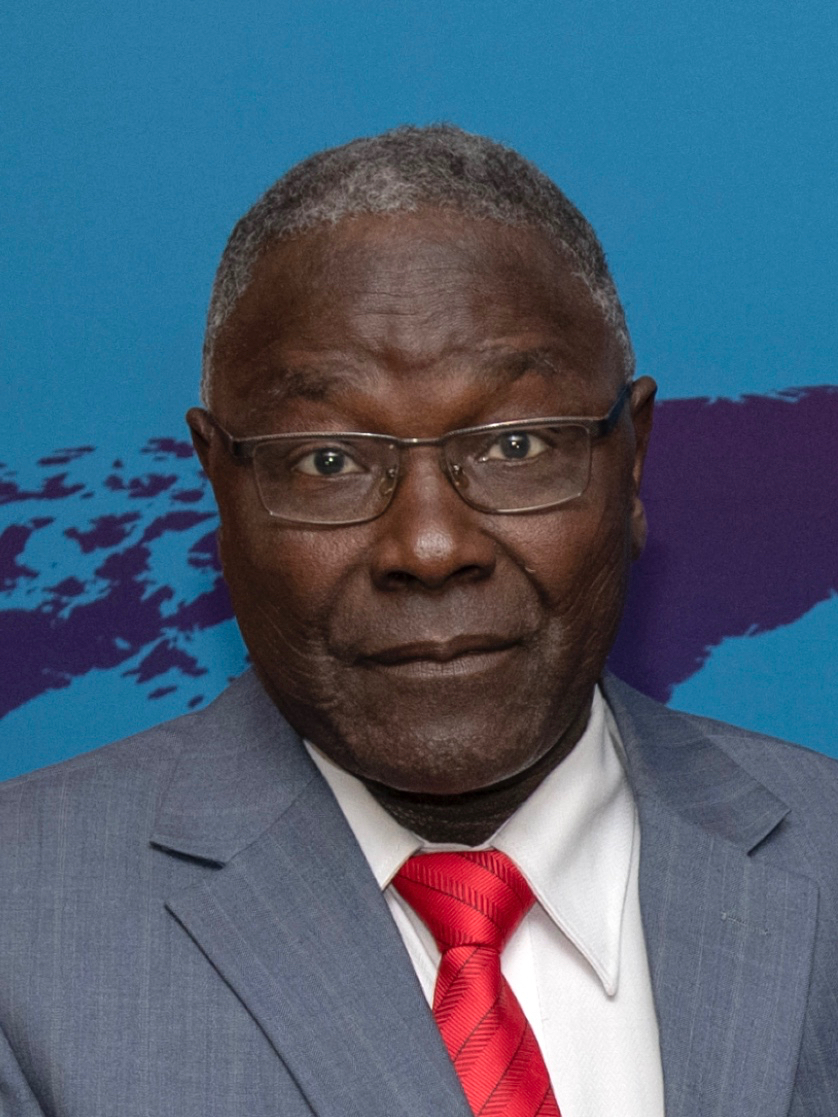
Kalla Ankourao, 2019

Kalla Ankourao (born 1 January 1946) is a Nigerien politician. A member of the Nigerien Party for Democracy and Socialism (PNDS), he was Minister of Public Health from 1995 to 1996 and Minister of Equipment from 2011 to 2012.

== Political career ==
During the 1980s, Ankourao worked at the Ministry of Public Works and Urban Planning as Director of Urban Planning.

Ankourao was elected to the National Assembly of Niger in the February 1993 parliamentary election as a PNDS candidate in Maradi Department. Following the January 1995 parliamentary election, he was appointed Minister of Public Health in the government named on February 25, 1995; this government was overthrown in a military coup in January 1996. He was later elected to the National Assembly in the December 2004 parliamentary election as a PNDS candidate from Maradi Department and became President of the PNDS Parliamentary Group during the parliamentary term that followed.

As of the Fourth Ordinary Congress of the PNDS in September 2004, Ankourao is a member of the party's National Executive Committee as Second Deputy Secretary-General.

After Mahamadou Issoufou won the January–March 2011 presidential election and took office as President on 7 April 2011, Ankourao was appointed to the government as Minister of Equipment on 21 April 2011.

Ankourao served as Minister of Equipment for a little less than a year; he was dismissed from the government on 2 April 2012. He was elected to the National Assembly in the February 2016 parliamentary election.
