= Maman Sambo Sidikou =

Nigerien politician & diplomat (born 1949)

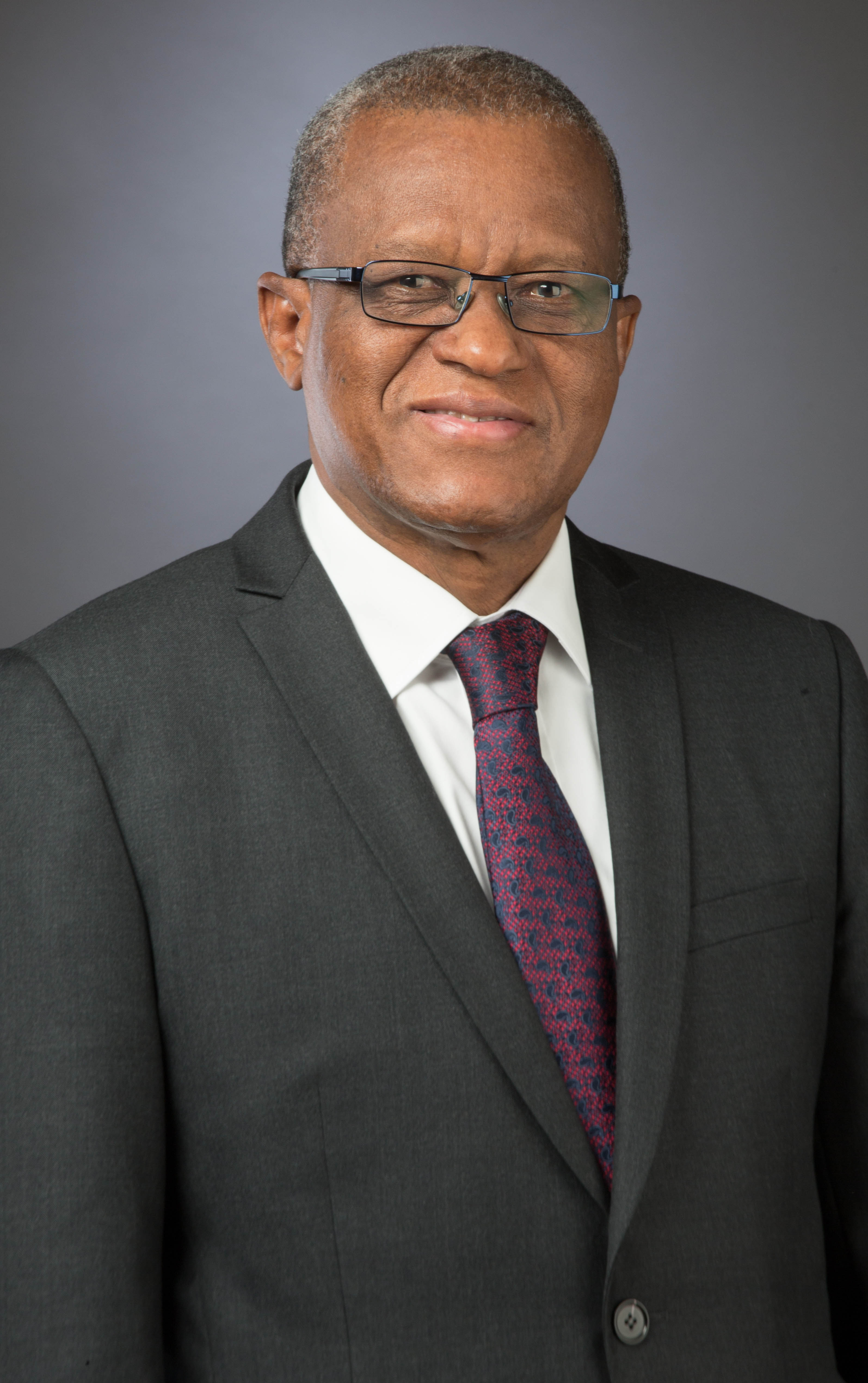
Maman Sambo Sidikou in 2018.

Maman Sambo Sidikou (born 1949) is a diplomat and a former Nigerien politician. He is currently the high representative of the African Union for Mali and the Sahel. From 2011 to 2014, he served as Niger's ambassador to the United States, he oversaw U.N. peacekeeping efforts in the Democratic Republic of the Congo from 2015 to 2018, and from 2018 to 2021 he served as executive secretary of the G5 Sahel.

== Career ==
Maman Sidikou was initially trained as a journalist, then entered government service in 1976. He has primarily been involved in Niger's diplomatic efforts, although he has also served on the staffs of the president and prime minister, and in the country's Ministry of Information.

Under President Ibrahim Baré Maïnassara, he was appointed minister of foreign affairs and African integration from 1997 to 1999. He also served as presidential chief of staff until the election of President Mamadou Tandja. Then, during Tandja's time in office, Sidikou left government and worked for a variety of intergovernmental and nonprofit organizations, including the World Bank, UNICEF, and Save the Children.

From 2011 to 2014, he served as Niger's ambassador to the United States. He subsequently represented the African Union in Somalia between 2014 and 2015. Then, from 2015 to 2018, he served as the United Nations secretary-general's special representative for the Democratic Republic of the Congo and head of the U.N. peacekeeping mission there, MONUSCO.

Sidikou was appointed executive secretary of the G5 Sahel by the organization's heads of state at their summit in Niamey, Niger, on 6 February 2018. In 2021, he left this post and was appointed the high representative of the African Union for Mali and the Sahel.

He holds a PhD in education from Florida State University.

== Personal life ==
Sidikou is married to fellow diplomat Fatima Djibo Sidikou. They have two children.

Preceded by Ibrahim Hassane Mayaki	Foreign Minister of Niger; 1997-1999	Succeeded by Aïchatou Mindaoudou
