= Ministry of Finance (Niger) =

Nigerien governmental public finance department

- Ministère des Finances (French)
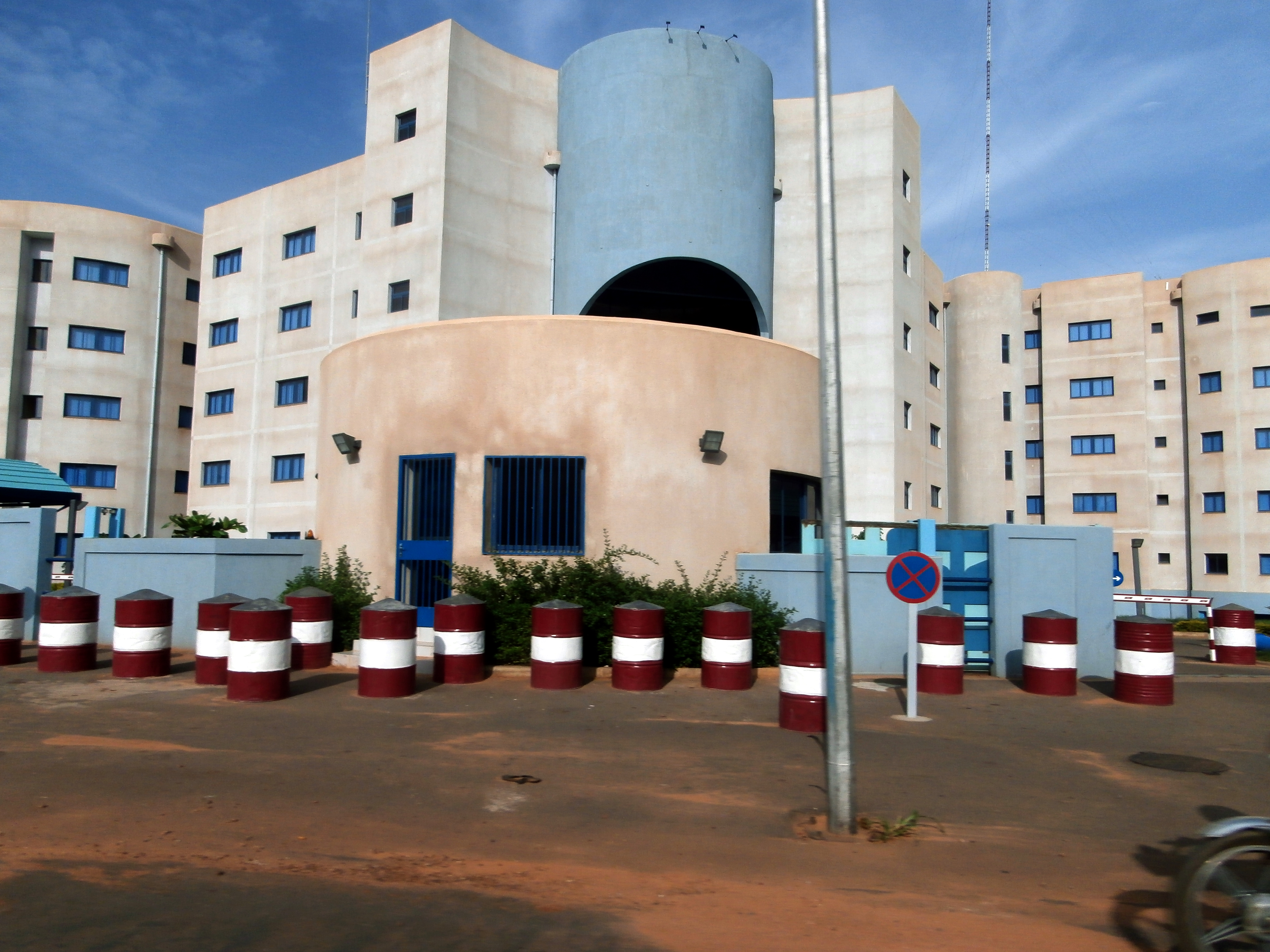

Ministry overview
- Formed: 1958
- Jurisdiction: Government of Niger
- Headquarters: Boulevard de la République, Niamey
- Minister responsible: Ali Lamine Zeine, Minister of Finance
- Website: Official Website

The Ministry of Finance of Niger is a department of the Government of Niger in charge of public finances of Niger.

== Ministers of Finance ==
- Issa Diop, 1958
- Barcourgné Courmo, 1958–1970
- Mouddour Zakara, 1970–1974
- Moussa Tondi, 1974–1983
- Boukary Adji, 1983–1987
- Mamadou Beïdari, 1987–1988
- Wassalke Boukari, 1988–1991
- Laoual Chaffani, 1991–1993
- Abdallah Boureima, 1993–1994
- Mohamed Moudy, 1994–1995
- Almoustapha Soumaïla, 1995–1996
- Amadou Boubacar Cissé, 1996
- Jacques Nignon, 1996–1997
- Ahmadou Mayaki, 1997
- Idé Niandou, 1997–1999
- Saïdou Sidibé, 1999–2000
- Ali Badjo Gamatié, 2000–2002
- Ali Lamine Zeine, 2002–2010
- Mamane Malam Annou, 2010–2011
- Ouhoumoudou Mahamadou, 2011–2012
- Gilles Baillet, 2012–2015
- Saïdou Sidibé, 2015–2016
- Hassoumi Massoudou, 2016–2019
- Mamadou Diop, 2019–2021
- Ahmat Jidoud, 2021–2023
- Ali Lamine Zeine, 2023–present

== See also ==
- Government of Niger
- Economy of Niger
