= Ali Lamine Zeine =

Prime Minister of Niger since 2023

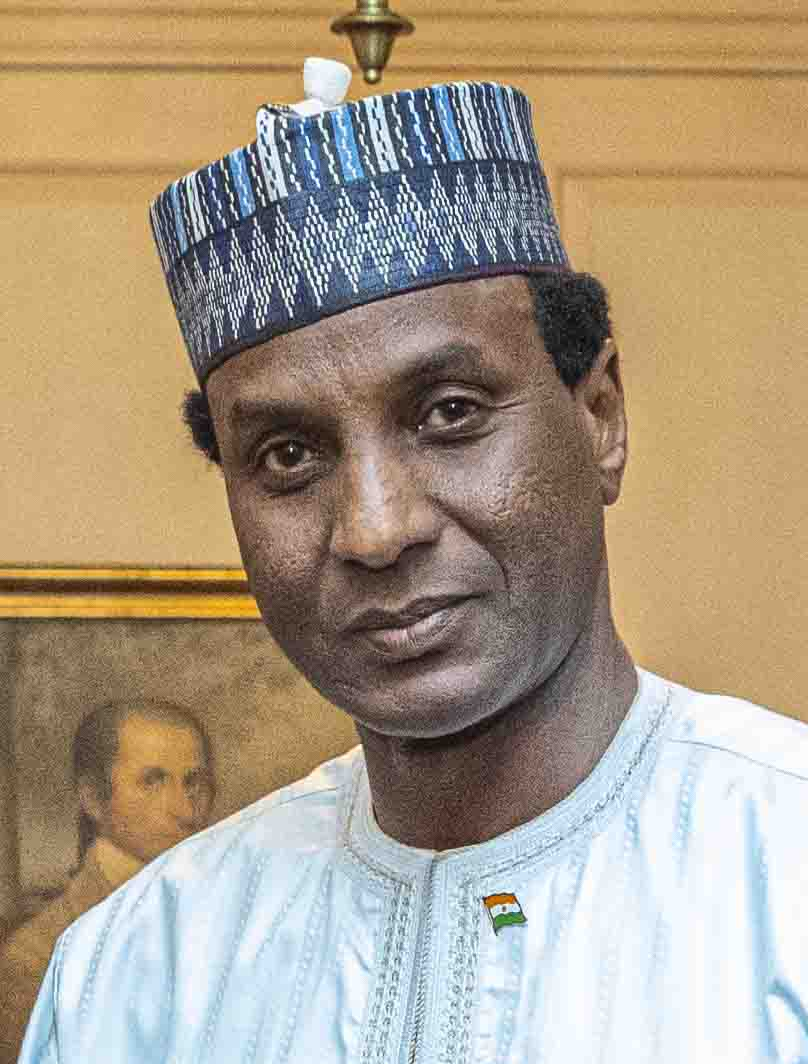
- Zeine in 2024

Prime Minister of Niger
- Incumbent
- Assumed office 8 August 2023
- President: Abdourahamane Tiani
- Preceded by: Ouhoumoudou Mahamadou

Minister of Finance
- Incumbent
- Assumed office 10 August 2023
- President: Abdourahamane Tiani
- Prime Minister: Himself
- Preceded by: Ahmat Jidoud
- In office 24 October 2003 – 18 February 2010
- President: Mamadou Tandja
- Prime Minister: Hama Amadou; Seyni Oumarou
- Preceded by: Ali Badjo Gamatie
- Succeeded by: Mamane Malam Annou

Personal details
- Born: Ali Mahamane Lamine Zeine; 1965 (age 60–61) Zinder, Niger
- Party: Independent (Affiliated with the MNSD–Nassara, the MPR-Jamhuriya and the MODEN/FA-Lumana)
- Religion: Islam

Ali Mahamane Lamine Zeine (born 1965) is a Nigerien politician and economist who has served as the prime minister of Niger since 2023. He previously served as minister of the Economy and Finance from 2003 to 2010.

== Biography ==
An ethnic Tubu, Ali Lamine Zeine was born in 1965 in Zinder and graduated from the Centre for Financial, Economic and Banking Studies in Marseille and Paris-I. He worked as a resident representative of the African Development Bank in Chad, Ivory Coast and Gabon.

After serving as Director of the Cabinet of President Mamadou Tandja, Zeine was appointed to the government as Minister of the Economy and Finance on 24 October 2003.

In 2009, a newspaper editor, Boussada Ben Ali, alleged that Zeine had stolen money that was part of an oil contract between Niger and China. Ben Ali was later arrested and sentenced to three months in prison for disseminating false information.

Tandja was ousted in a military coup on 18 February 2010 and his government was dissolved. As one of Tandja's key associates, Zeine was one of only three ministers who were not promptly released from house arrest in the days after the coup. According to one of the junta leaders, Colonel Djibrilla Hima Hamidou, the ministers "still under surveillance" had held "very sensitive portfolios" and therefore it was necessary "to ensure their security". The MNSD called for the release of Zeine, Tandja, and the others.

Zeine was appointed prime minister by the Nigerien military junta on 8 August 2023, and appointed finance minister on 10 August 2023.

His government included members of the MODEN/FA-Lumana, which became Independent from the 26 March 2025 on.

Political offices
Preceded by Ouhoumoudou Mahamadou	Prime Minister of Niger; 2023–present	Incumbent
