= Mohamed Bazoum =

President of Niger from 2021 to 2023

- محمد بازوم
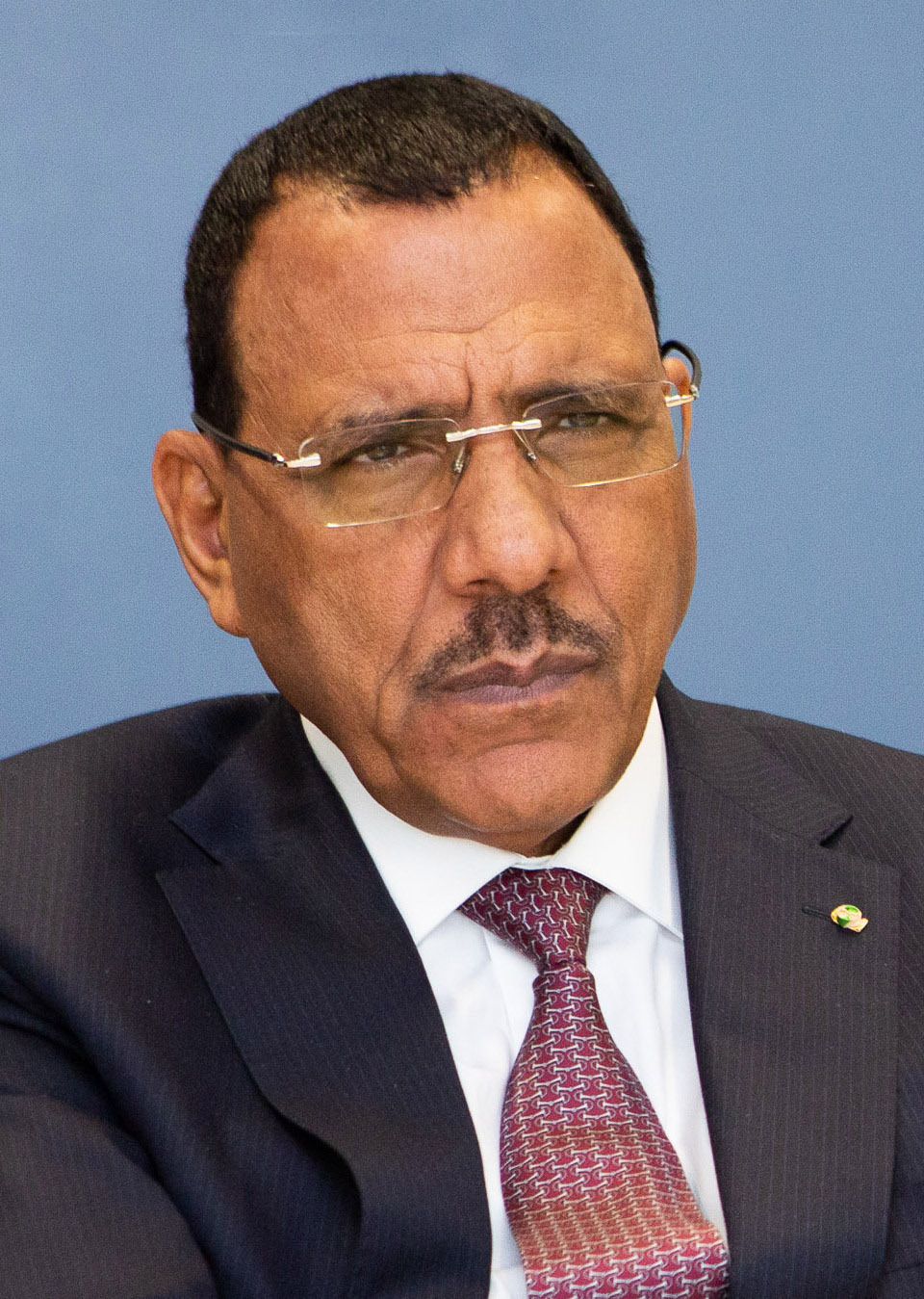
- Bazoum in 2023

President of Niger
- In office 2 April 2021 – 26 July 2023
- Prime Minister: Ouhoumoudou Mahamadou
- Preceded by: Mahamadou Issoufou
- Succeeded by: Abdourahamane Tiani

President of the Nigerien Party for Democracy and Socialism
- In office March 2011 – 20 December 2022
- Preceded by: Mahamadou Issoufou
- Succeeded by: Foumakoye Gado

Minister of the Interior
- In office 13 April 2016 – 1 April 2021
- President: Mahamadou Issoufou
- Prime Minister: Brigi Rafini
- Preceded by: Hassoumi Massaoudou
- Succeeded by: Alkache Alhada

Minister of Foreign Affairs
- In office 21 April 2011 – 26 February 2016
- President: Mahamadou Issoufou
- Prime Minister: Brigi Rafini
- Preceded by: Aminatou Maïga Touré
- Succeeded by: Aïchatou Boulama Kané
- In office 25 February 1995 – 5 May 1996
- President: Mahamane Ousmane
- Prime Minister: Amadou Cissé
- Preceded by: Abdourahmane Hama
- Succeeded by: André Salifou

Member of the National Assembly
- In office February 2005 – 2021
- Constituency: unknown
- In office 11 April 1993 – January 1995
- Constituency: Tesker (special)

Personal details
- Born: 1 January 1960 (age 66) Bilabrine, N'guigmi Cercle, French Niger
- Party: PNDS-Tarayya
- Spouse: Hadiza Ben Mabrouk
- Children: 4
- Education: Cheikh Anta Diop University
- Religion: Sunni Islam
- Ethnicity: Ouled Slimane Arab

Mohamed Bazoum (Note: Arabic: محمد بازوم, romanized: Muḥammad Bāzūm) (born 1 January 1960) is a Nigerien politician who served as president of Niger from 2021 to 2023. He assumed office in April 2021 after winning the 2020–21 presidential election and surviving a coup d'état attempt. He was ousted in the 2023 Nigerien coup d'état by members of the presidential guard and the armed forces led by Omar Tiani. He was arrested and subsequently charged with treason.

Before becoming president, he served as the president of the Nigerien Party for Democracy and Socialism (PNDS-Tarayya). He also served in as a minister of Foreign Affairs from 1995 to 1996 and again from 2011 to 2016. He was minister of State at the Presidency briefly in 2016 and was later appointed minister of State for the Interior between 2016 until his election as president in 2021, when he resigned to focus on running for the 2020–21 presidential election. Bazoum won the second round of the presidential election with 55.67% of the vote against former president Mahamane Ousmane.

Bazoum, a member of the minority Ouled Slimane people, is the first Arab to become president of Niger.

== Early life and career ==
Mohamed Bazoum was born in 1960 in the village of Bilabrin, French Niger, in the present-day Diffa Region of Niger. He was raised in the town of Tesker, 200 kilometers west of Bilabrin, in Zinder Region. Bazoum is a member of the Ouled Slimane people, an Arab tribe originally from the Fezzan region of Libya who constitute a small minority within both Niger and the larger Nigerien Arab population.

Bazoum attended primary school in Goure and graduated from Amadou-Kouran-Daga High School (lycée Amadou-Kouran-Daga) in Zinder. He studied philosophy in the faculty of letters and human sciences' philosophy department at Cheikh Anta Diop University (sometimes called the University of Dakar) in Senegal from 1979 to 1984. Bazoum then completed his master's degree in political and moral philosophy, also at the University of Dakar, including a diploma in logic and epistemology.

Following the completion of his degrees, Bazoum taught at several provincial high schools for six years. He also joined the National Union of Teachers of Niger (SNEN), a national trade union. Bazoum then joined the executive committee of the Trade Union of Workers of Niger (USTN), which he represented at the 1991 National Conference.

Bazoum is married to Hadiza Mabrouk Bazoum, who became First Lady of Niger. They have four children: one son, Salem Bazoum, and three daughters, including Zazia Bazoum and Khadija Bazoum. Bazoum is a Sunni Muslim and a polyglot, he speaks Arabic, Hausa, Toubou, Kanuri, French and some English.

== Early political career ==
Bazoum became a founding member of the Nigerien Party for Democracy and Socialism in 1990, along with Mahamadou Issoufou.

Bazoum served as Secretary of State for Cooperation under the Minister of Foreign Affairs and Cooperation in the transitional government of Prime Minister Amadou Cheiffou from 1991 to 1993. He was elected to the National Assembly from the special constituency of Tesker as the PNDS candidate in a special election held on 11 April 1993; this followed the cancellation of the initial election in Tesker, held in February.

After the January 1995 parliamentary election, which was won by an opposition coalition of the National Movement for the Development of Society (MNSD) and the PNDS, Bazoum became Minister of Foreign Affairs and Cooperation in the government of Prime Minister Hama Amadou, named on 25 February 1995. He was initially reappointed to that post after Ibrahim Baré Maïnassara seized power in a military coup on 27 January 1996, but he was replaced in the government named on 5 May 1996. The PNDS opposed Maïnassara, and on 26 July 1996, Bazoum was placed under house arrest along with PNDS President Mahamadou Issoufou, a few weeks after the 1996 presidential election. He and Issoufou were released on the orders of a judge on 12 August 1996.

Bazoum was arrested along with two other major opposition politicians, including MNSD Secretary-General Hama Amadou, in early January 1998, for allegedly participating in a plot to assassinate Maïnassara. He was never charged and was released a week after his arrest.

== Parliamentary career ==
At the Fourth Ordinary Congress of the PNDS, held on 4–5 September 2004, Bazoum was elected as its Vice-President. Bazoum was again elected to the National Assembly in the December 2004 parliamentary election, and during the parliamentary term that followed he was Third Vice-President of the National Assembly and Vice-President of the PNDS Parliamentary Group.

Bazoum was one of 14 deputies who filed a censure motion against Prime Minister Hama Amadou on 26 May 2007; Amadou's government was defeated in the subsequent no-confidence vote on 31 May, and Bazoum praised the "maturity of the political class of Niger that has just put an end to the mandate of the team which specialised in the predation of public funds."

After urging the people to boycott the August 2009 constitutional referendum, Bazoum was briefly detained and questioned for two hours on 14 July 2009. Bazoum was re-elected as PNDS Vice-President at the party's Fifth Ordinary Congress, held on 18 July 2009. Following the success of the referendum, he characterized it as a "coup d'état" and said that the October 2009 parliamentary election was an "electoral farce" intended merely to add a "democratic polish".

President Mamadou Tandja was ousted by a military coup on 18 February 2010. Bazoum said on the occasion that "this is exactly what we were afraid of, a military resolution. Tandja could have avoided this." As one of the leading members of the Coordination of Democratic Forces for the Republic (CFDR), an opposition coalition, he said on 23 February that the CFDR wanted Tandja to be put on trial for high treason because he had abrogated the 1999 constitution in his efforts to remain in power. According to Bazoum, such a trial was necessary to deter future leaders from pursuing a similar course. He said that the junta should hold Tandja until "democratic institutions" were in place, and then Tandja should be tried, although he also said that he felt the death penalty would be unnecessary.

After Mahamadou Issoufou won the January–March 2011 presidential election, he stepped down as PNDS President in March 2011, prior to his swearing-in, in accordance with the requirement that the head of state not participate in partisan politics; Bazoum took over as Acting President of the PNDS. Issoufou took office as President of Niger on 7 April 2011, and Bazoum was appointed to the government as Minister of State for Foreign Affairs, Cooperation, African Integration, and Nigeriens Abroad on 21 April 2011.

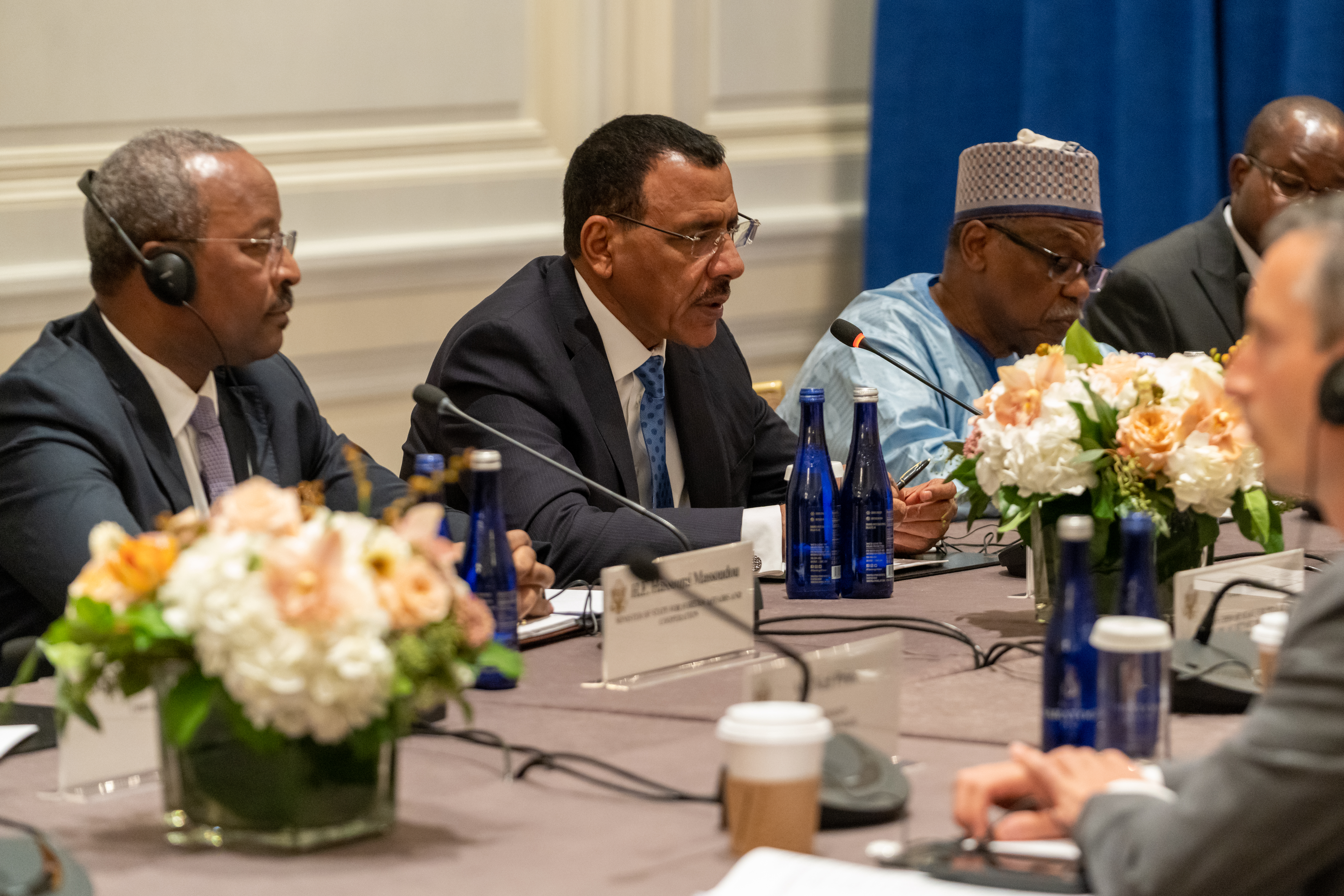
Bazoum at the United Nations General Assembly in New York City in 2022

Bazoum was moved to the post of Minister of State at the Presidency on 25 February 2015. The move was viewed as allowing Bazoum to focus on leading the PNDS in anticipation of Issoufou's bid for re-election in 2016.

He was elected to the National Assembly in the February 2016 parliamentary election. After Issoufou was sworn in for a second term, Bazoum was appointed as Minister of State for the Interior, Public Security, Decentralization, and Customary and Religious Affairs on 11 April 2016. He took office on 13 April, succeeding Hassoumi Massaoudou.

== Presidency (2021–2023) ==
As a high-ranking member of the Nigerien government, Bazoum was named the successor to Issoufou, who was term-limited, as the presidential candidate for the PNDS in the 2020–21 Nigerien general election. Bazoum's presidential campaign focused on ideas such as resolving demographic problems within Niger by limiting family size and increasing literacy and gender equality through more education for girls. Bazoum has also promised to target the ISIS insurgency in Niger, assisting the neighboring country of Mali in the process, reinforce Nigerien defence and security, and tackle corruption in the country. Bazoum did not win the first round of the election, held on 27 December 2020, obtaining only 39.30% of the vote. However, he won the runoff election in February 2021 with 55.67% of the vote and was sworn in as President on 2 April, his victory being confirmed on 21 March.

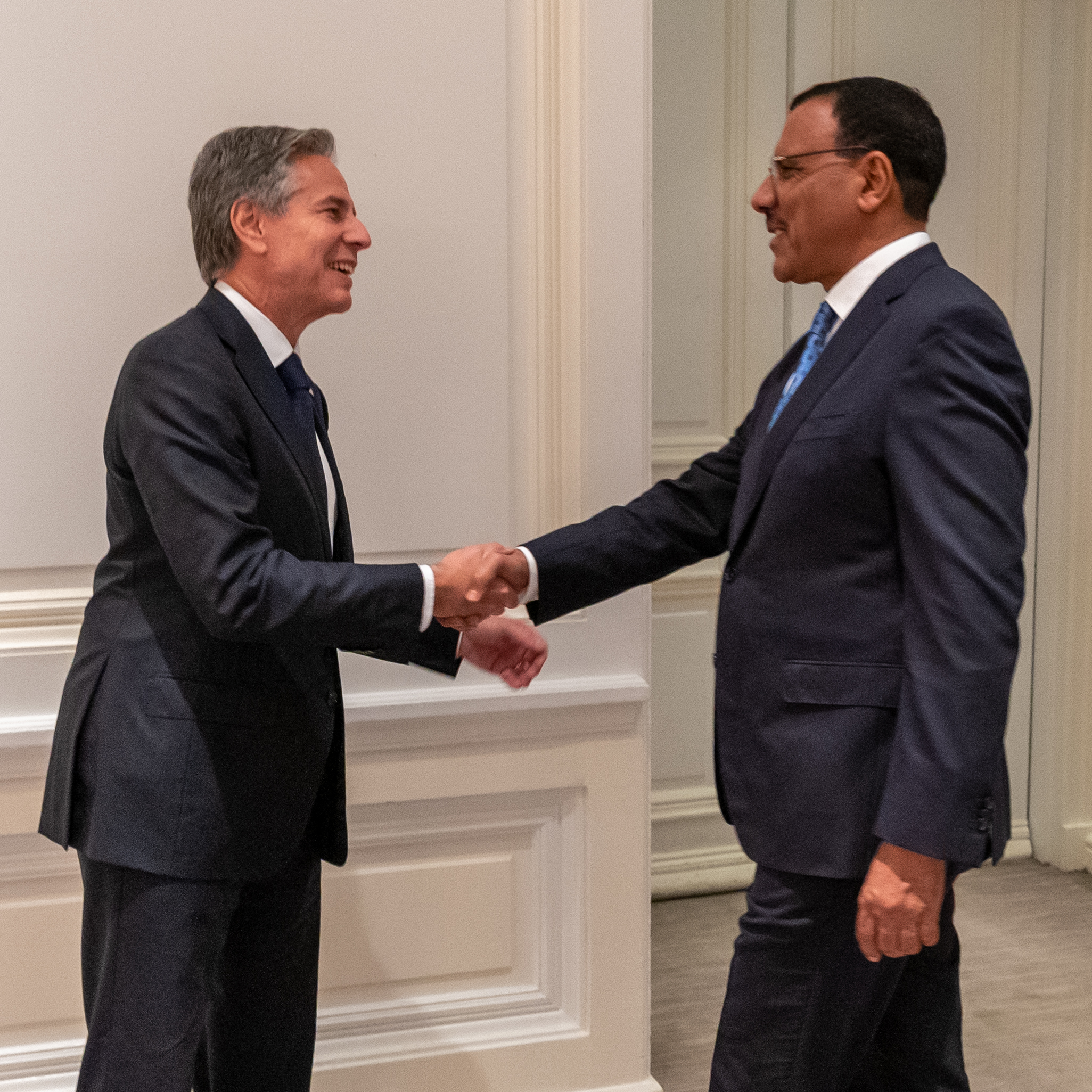
Bazoum with U.S. Secretary of State Antony Blinken in September 2022

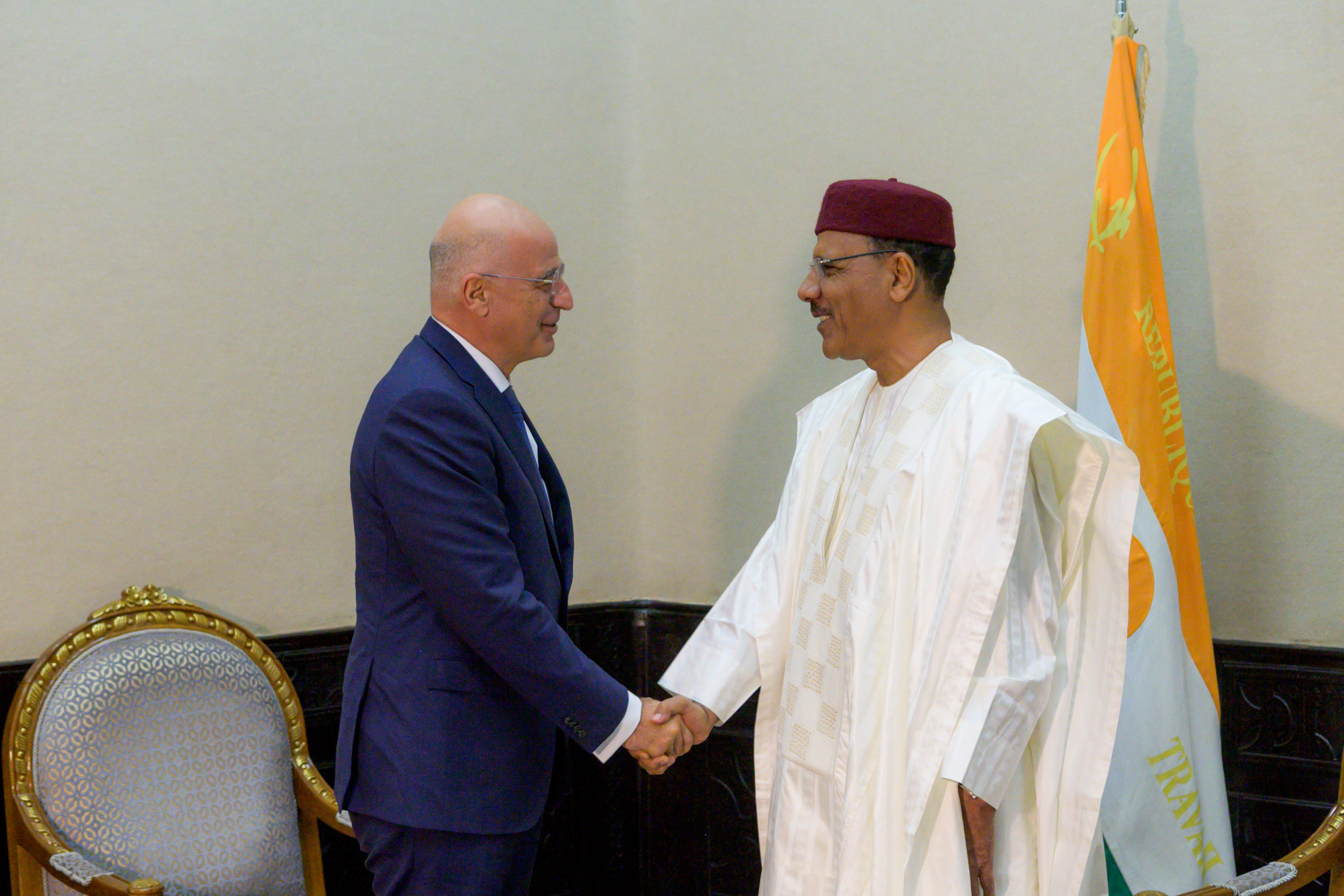
Bazoum with Greek Minister of Foreign Affairs Nikos Dendias in November 2022

In December 2022, Bazoum was appointed current president of the West African Economic and Monetary Union (UEMOA), during the 23rd ordinary summit of heads of state and government of the organization in Abidjan.

=== Overthrow ===
On 26 July 2023, soldiers of the Presidential Guard commanded by General Omar Tiani blockaded the presidential palace to depose Bazoum. The coup was condemned by the African Union and Economic Community of West African States (ECOWAS). ECOWAS told the plotters to free Bazoum immediately. Bazoum was later deposed at the end of the day, with Colonel-Major Amadou Abdramane going on state television to claim that the President had been removed from power and was being replaced by a military junta calling itself the National Council for the Safeguard of the Homeland, whose leadership was claimed by General Tiani on 28 July. Sources close to Bazoum said that he had decided on Tiani's dismissal at a cabinet meeting prior to the coup, on 24 July as their relations had reportedly become strained. In his address to the nation, Tiani accused Bazoum of trying to cover up for the country's political, socioeconomic and security problems.

== Post-presidency (2023–present) ==
On 27 July, Bazoum tweeted that Nigeriens who love democracy would see to it that "hard-won gains will be safeguarded", indicating his refusal to step down from office. His foreign minister Hassoumi Massaoudou insisted that the country's "legal and legitimate power" remained with the president and reiterated that Bazoum was in good condition. He also declared himself acting head of state and called on all democrats to "make this adventure fail".

Bazoum was believed to be detained at the presidential palace along with his wife, Hadiza Bazoum, and son Salem; his daughters were vacationing in Paris at the time of the coup. Despite being detained, Bazoum has continuously refused to resign and has been able to get in contact with world leaders and officials such as French President Emmanuel Macron, Yoana Georgieva, UN Secretary-General António Guterres, AU Commissioner Moussa Faki, and US Secretary of State Antony Blinken.

On 31 July, the office of Chadian president Mahamat Déby released pictures of him meeting with a smiling Bazoum, marking his first appearance since the coup. On 3 August, in an opinion piece in The Washington Post, Bazoum expressed that he was writing "as a hostage" and called on the US and the "entire international community" to help "restore... constitutional order," warning that the region could "fall further under Russian influence." On 9 August, his PNDS-Tarayya party announced that he and his family had been without both electricity and running water for a week, and had only dried and canned foods left to eat. Subsequent reports described his health as in a bad condition. His doctor said the former president was "fine, given the situation" after visiting him on 12 August.

On 13 August, the junta announced that it would prosecute Bazoum for "high treason" and "undermining the country's security".

On 1 December, his wife stated that there had been no news that had come from him since 18 October. This came after several members of the Bazoum family had either been arrested or had their homes fully searched.

On 10 December, ECOWAS hosted a summit in which member states promised to lift sanctions imposed on Niger if the junta freed Bazoum. The military government rejected the offer and stated that Bazoum would not be released. On 15 December, the ECOWAS Court of Justice ordered the release and reinstatement of Bazoum as president of Niger.

In early 2024, Bazoum fell ill with malaria.

In June 2024, the Supreme Court of Niger lifted his sovereign immunity after accusing him of high treason, an offense punishable by death in Niger, and other alleged offenses. Bazoum continued to refuse to sign his resignation decree and remained imprisoned with his wife by the Nigerien junta at his presidential residence. On 28 August, he was questioned by the police as part of the preliminary investigation at his residence.

In February 2025, a United Nations working group called for the immediate release of Mohamed Bazoum and his wife, Hadiza Bazoum, the United Nations considering their detention to be "arbitrary", in violation of international law. In 2026, democracy activist Mariama Djibrine had her Nigerien citizenship revoked after publicly calling for Bazoum's release.

== Notes ==
Political offices
Preceded by Abdourahmane Hama	Foreign Minister of Niger; 1995–1996	Succeeded by André Salifou
Preceded by Touré Aminatou Maiga	Foreign Minister of Niger; 2011–2016	Succeeded by Aïchatou Boulama Kané
Preceded by Hassoumi Massaoudou	Interior Minister of Niger; 2016–2021	Succeeded by Alkache Alhada
Preceded by Mahamadou Issoufou	President of Niger; 2021–2023	Succeeded by Abdourahamane Tiani
