= Ouhoumoudou Mahamadou =

Prime Minister of Niger from 2021 to 2023

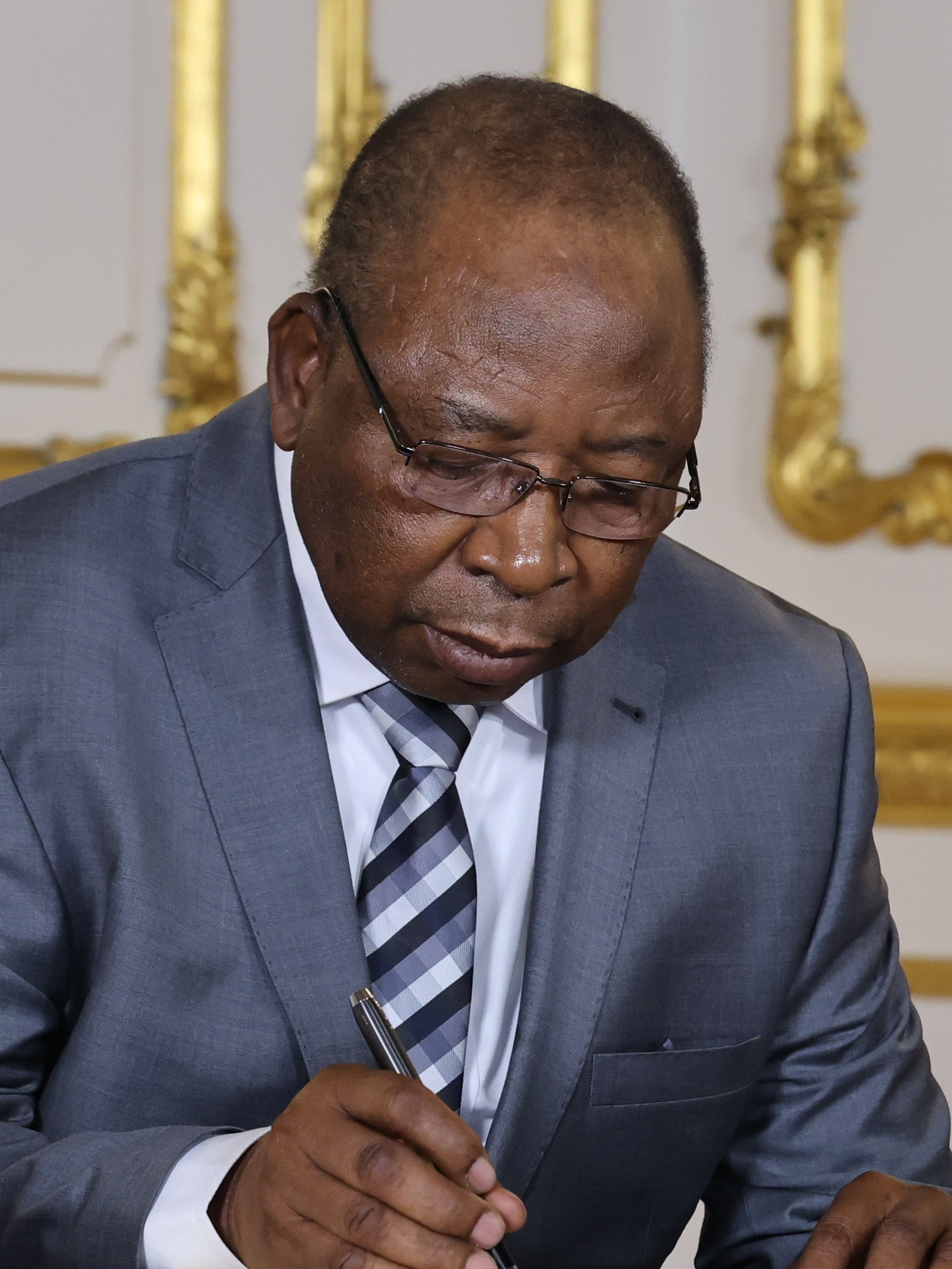
- Mahamadou in 2022

Prime Minister of Niger
- In office 3 April 2021 – 26 July 2023
- President: Mohamed Bazoum
- Preceded by: Brigi Rafini
- Succeeded by: Ali Lamine Zeine

Minister of Mines, Energy and Industry
- In office 1991–1993

Minister of Finance
- In office April 2011 – 2012
- President: Mahamadou Issoufou
- Prime Minister: Brigi Rafini

Personal details
- Born: Ouhoumoudou Mahamadou; 1954 (age 71–72) French Niger
- Party: Nigerien Party for Democracy and Socialism
- Religion: Islam

Ouhoumoudou Mahamadou (born 1954) is a Nigerien politician of the Nigerien Party for Democracy and Socialism (PNDS-Tarayya) who served as Prime Minister of Niger between 3 April 2021 and 26 July 2023, when he was removed in a coup d'état.

Mahamadou served as Niger's Minister of Mines, Energy, and Industry from 1991 to 1993 and as Minister of Finance from April 2011 to April 2012. He has been Director of the Cabinet of the President since 2015.

== Career ==
In the transitional government of Prime Minister Ahmadou Cheiffou, appointed on 7 November 1991, Mahamadou was included as Minister of Mines, Energy, Industry, and Crafts. He was retained in his post in a cabinet reshuffle on 31 January 1993. Multiparty elections were held in February 1993, bringing the transition to an end; Mahamadou was not included in the government that was appointed on 23 April 1993. He served as Deputy Executive Secretary of the Economic Community of West African States (ECOWAS) under the leadership of Executive Secretary Édouard Benjamin from 1993 until 1998 and then worked as Lutheran World Relief's Regional Representative for West Africa.

After PNDS President Mahamadou Issoufou won the January–March 2011 presidential election and took office as President of Niger, Ouhoumoudou Mahamadou was appointed Minister of Finance on 21 April 2011.

Mahamadou served as Minister of Finance for a little less than a year; he was dismissed on 2 April 2012. Later the same month, he was appointed Director-General of Banque Internationale pour l’Afrique au Niger (BIA-Niger), a major bank.

Mahamadou was appointed Director of the Cabinet of the President on 4 June 2015. After Issoufou was sworn in for a second term, he retained Mahamadou in his post as Director of the Cabinet of the President on 11 April 2016.

== Prime minister ==
Mahamadou became Prime Minister on 3 April 2021.

Mahamadou was in Europe at the time of the 2023 Nigerien coup d'état, in which President Mohamed Bazoum was deposed by the military. Since then, he has stayed in Europe and has continued to support Bazoum, currently detained in the presidential palace in Niamey, as president. He also welcomed the imposition of sanctions by ECOWAS on the military junta as “very satisfactory and logical”, while insisting that anti-French demonstrations in Niamey did not represent the Nigerien people as a whole. He maintained a low profile afterwards.

In 2025, the junta froze his assets and restricted his movement, accusing him of treason.

Political offices
Preceded by Brigi Rafini	Prime Minister of Niger; 2021–2023	Succeeded by Ali Lamine Zeine
