= Outline of Niger =

Overview of and topical guide to Niger

The Flag of Niger

The Coat of arms of Niger

The location of Niger

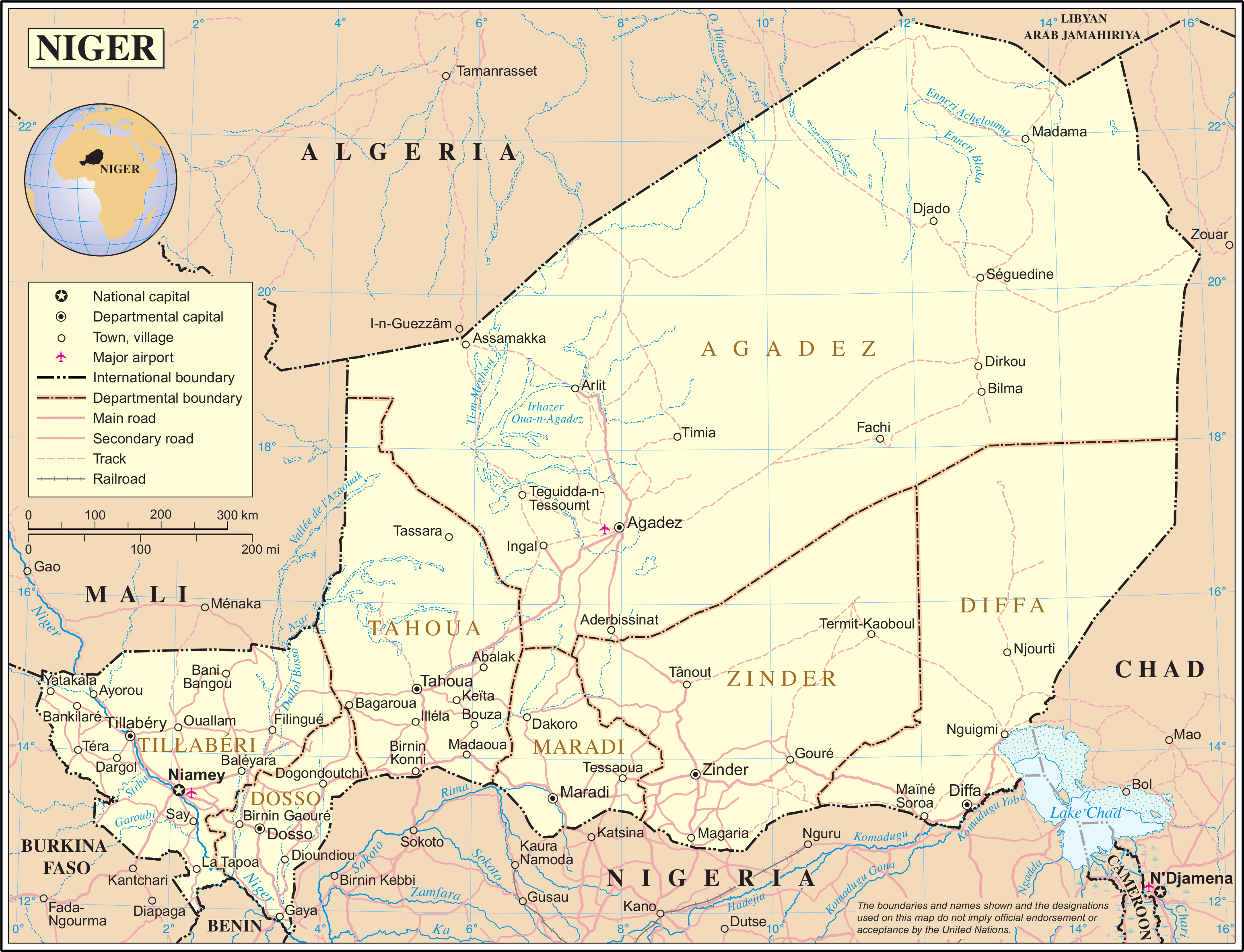
An enlargeable map of Niger

The following outline is provided as an overview of and topical guide to Niger:

Niger – landlocked sovereign country located in West Africa. It was named for the Niger River. It borders Nigeria and Benin to the south, Burkina Faso and Mali to the west, Algeria and Libya to the north and Chad to the east. The capital city is Niamey.

== General reference ==
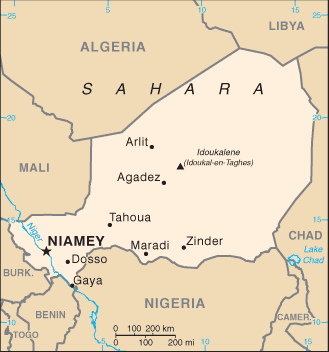
An enlargeable basic map of Niger

- Pronunciation: /niːˈʒɛər/ or /ˈnaɪdʒər/
- Common English country name: Niger
- Official English country name: The Republic of Niger
- Common endonym(s):
- Official endonym(s):
- Adjectival(s): Nigerien
- Demonym(s): Nigerien(s)
- ISO country codes: NE, NER, 562
- ISO region codes: See ISO 3166-2:NE
- Internet country code top-level domain: .ne

== Geography of Niger ==
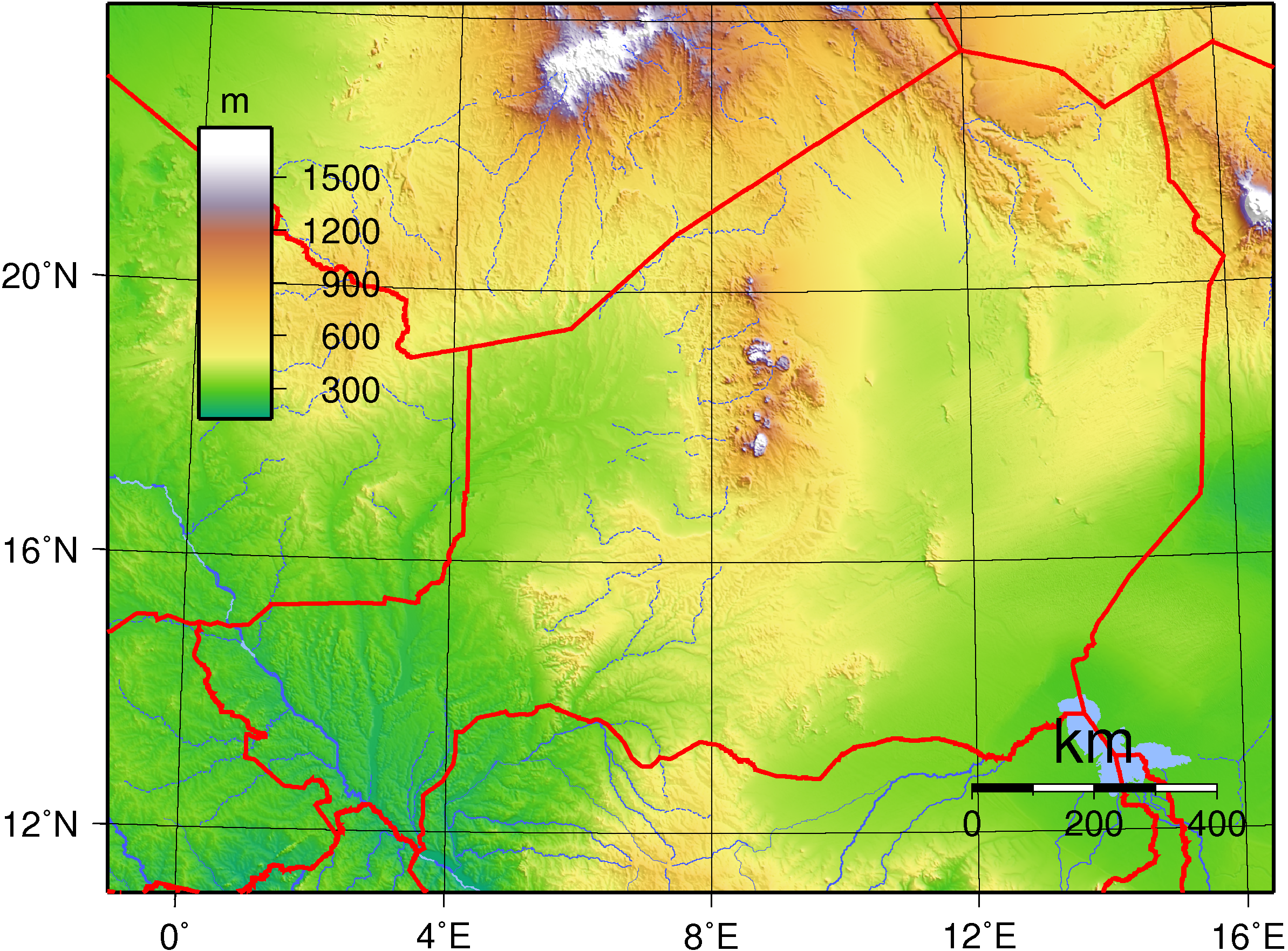
An enlargeable topographic map of Niger

Geography of Niger

- Niger is: a landlocked country
- Population of Niger: 14,226,000 - 55th most populous country
- Area of Niger: 1,267,000 km^{2}
- Atlas of Niger

=== Location ===
- Niger is situated within the following regions:
  - Northern Hemisphere and Eastern Hemisphere
  - Africa
    - West Africa
    - partially within the Sahara Desert
- Time zone: West Africa Time (UTC+01)
- Extreme points of Niger
  - High: Mont Idoukal-n-Taghès 2,022 m (6,634 ft)
  - Low: Niger River 200 m (656 ft)
- Land boundaries: 5,697 km

Nigeria 1,497 km
Chad 1,175 km
Algeria 956 km
Mali 821 km
Burkina Faso 628 km
Libya 354 km
Benin 266 km

- Coastline: none

=== Environment of Niger ===
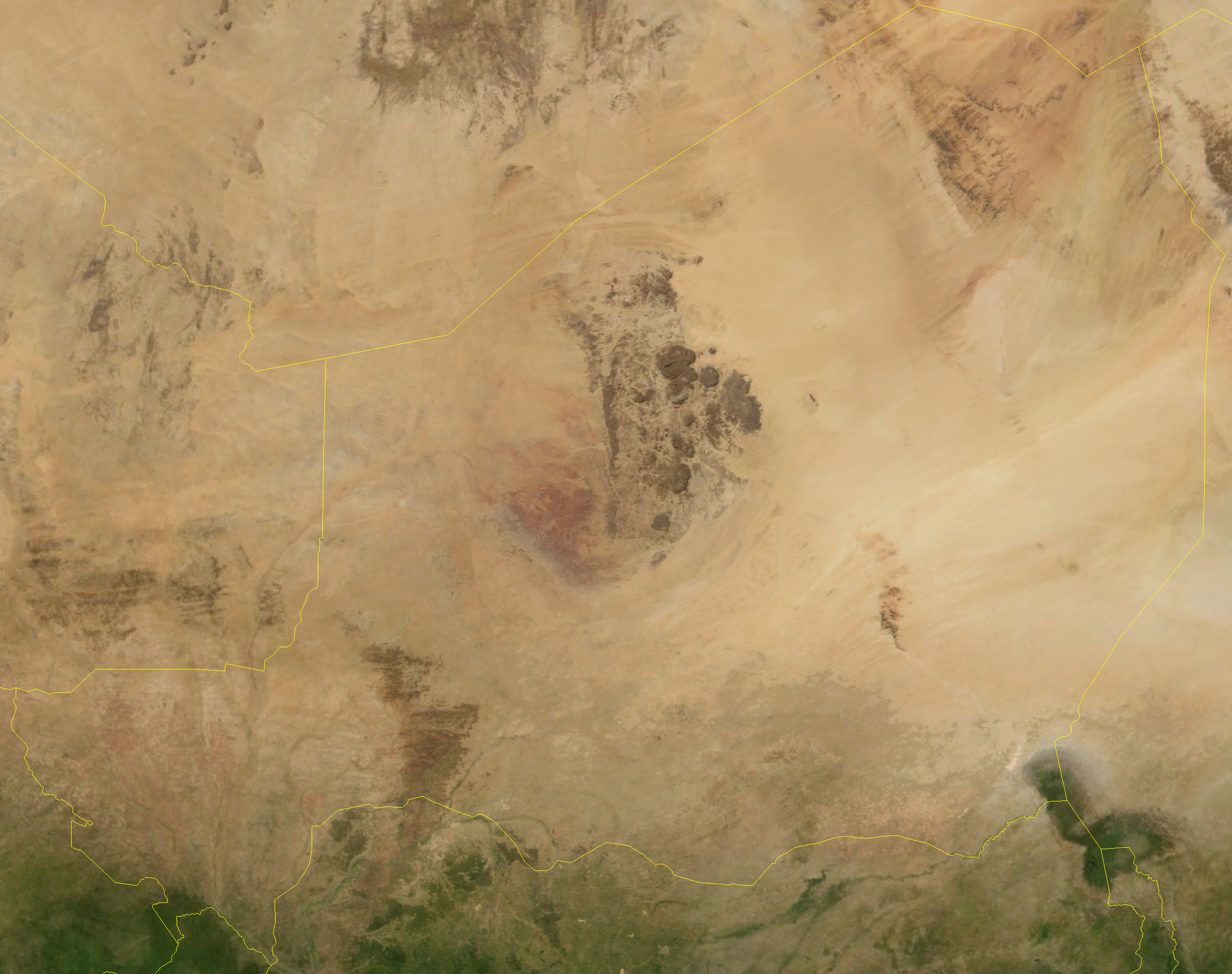
An enlargeable satellite image of Niger

- Climate of Niger
- Renewable energy in Niger
  - Kandadji Dam
- Protected areas of Niger
  - National parks of Niger
    - W National Park
- Wildlife of Niger
  - Fauna of Niger
    - Birds of Niger
    - Mammals of Niger

==== Natural geographic features of Niger ====
- Glaciers in Niger: none
- Islands of Niger
  - Lété Island
- Mountains of Niger
  - Aïr Mountains
- Djado Plateau
- Rivers of Niger
  - Niger River
- World Heritage Sites in Niger

=== Regions of Niger ===
Regions of Niger

- Arbre du Ténéré
- Azawagh
- Gadoufaoua
- Talak
- Ténéré

==== Ecoregions of Niger ====
List of ecoregions in Niger

- Azawagh and Ayr region

==== Administrative divisions of Niger ====
Administrative divisions of Niger

- Regions of Niger
  - Departments of Niger
    - Communes of Niger

===== Regions of Niger =====
Regions of Niger

  - Agadez Region
  - Diffa Region
  - Dosso Region
  - Maradi Region
  - Tahoua Region
  - Tillabéri Region
  - Zinder Region

===== Departments of Niger =====
Departments of Niger

===== Communes of Niger =====
Communes of Niger

===== Municipalities of Niger =====
- Capital of Niger: Niamey
- Cities in Niger
  - Abalak
  - Agadez
  - Arlit
  - Assamakka
  - Assodé
  - Ayourou
  - Bilma
  - Birni N'Gaouré
  - Birni-N'Konni
  - Dakoro
  - Diffa
  - Dogondoutchi
  - Dosso
  - Galmi
  - Gaya
  - In-Gall
  - Madaoua
  - Maradi
  - Mayahi
  - Miria
  - N'guigmi
  - Niamey
  - Ourofan
  - Say
  - Tahoua
  - Tchin-Tabaraden
  - Téra
  - Tessaoua
  - Tillabéri
  - Jikata
  - Tillabéri
  - Timia
  - Zinder

=== Demography of Niger ===
Demographics of Niger

== Government and politics of Niger ==
Politics of Niger

- Form of government: semi-presidential representative democratic republic
- Capital of Niger: Niamey
- Elections in Niger
- Political parties in Niger

=== Branches of the government of Niger ===
Government of Niger

==== Executive branch of the government of Niger ====
- Head of state: President of Niger, Abdourahamane Tiani
- Head of government: Prime Minister of Niger, Ali Lamine Zeine
- Council of Ministers of Niger

==== Legislative branch of the government of Niger ====
- Parliament of Niger (unicameral)

==== Judicial branch of the government of Niger ====
Court system of Niger

- Supreme Court of Niger

=== Foreign relations of Niger ===
Foreign relations of Niger

- Diplomatic missions in Niger
- Diplomatic missions of Niger

==== International organization membership ====
The Republic of Niger is a member of:

- Alliance of Sahel States (AES)
- African, Caribbean, and Pacific Group of States (ACP)
- African Development Bank Group (AfDB)
- African Union (AU) (Suspended)
- Conference des Ministres des Finances des Pays de la Zone Franc (FZ)
- Council of the Entente (Entente)
- Economic Community of West African States (ECOWAS) (Suspended)
- Food and Agriculture Organization (FAO)
- Group of 77 (G77)
- International Atomic Energy Agency (IAEA)
- International Bank for Reconstruction and Development (IBRD)
- International Civil Aviation Organization (ICAO)
- International Criminal Court (ICCt)
- International Criminal Police Organization (Interpol)
- International Development Association (IDA)
- International Federation of Red Cross and Red Crescent Societies (IFRCS)
- International Finance Corporation (IFC)
- International Fund for Agricultural Development (IFAD)
- International Labour Organization (ILO)
- International Monetary Fund (IMF)
- International Olympic Committee (IOC)
- International Organization for Migration (IOM)
- International Red Cross and Red Crescent Movement (ICRM)
- International Telecommunication Union (ITU)
- International Telecommunications Satellite Organization (ITSO)
- International Trade Union Confederation (ITUC)
- Inter-Parliamentary Union (IPU)
- Islamic Development Bank (IDB)
- Nonaligned Movement (NAM)
- Organisation internationale de la Francophonie (OIF)
- Organisation of Islamic Cooperation (OIC)
- Organisation for the Prohibition of Chemical Weapons (OPCW)
- United Nations (UN)
- United Nations Conference on Trade and Development (UNCTAD)
- United Nations Educational, Scientific, and Cultural Organization (UNESCO)
- United Nations Industrial Development Organization (UNIDO)
- United Nations Mission in Liberia (UNMIL)
- United Nations Operation in Cote d'Ivoire (UNOCI)
- United Nations Organization Mission in the Democratic Republic of the Congo (MONUC)
- Universal Postal Union (UPU)
- West African Development Bank (WADB) (regional)
- West African Economic and Monetary Union (WAEMU)
- World Confederation of Labour (WCL)
- World Customs Organization (WCO)
- World Federation of Trade Unions (WFTU)
- World Health Organization (WHO)
- World Intellectual Property Organization (WIPO)
- World Meteorological Organization (WMO)
- World Tourism Organization (UNWTO)
- World Trade Organization (WTO)

=== Law and order in Niger ===
Law of Niger

- Constitution of Niger
- Human rights in Niger
  - LGBT rights in Niger
- Law enforcement in Niger

=== Military of Niger ===
Military of Niger

- Command
  - Commander-in-chief: President of Niger
- Forces
  - Army of Niger
  - Navy of Niger: None
  - Air Force of Niger

=== Local government in Niger ===
- Local government in Niger

== History of Niger ==
History of Niger

- 2005-06 Niger food crisis
- Niger uranium forgeries
- Upper Senegal and Niger
- French West Africa
- Senegambia and Niger
- UTA Flight 772
- Nigerien presidential election, 1999
- Nigerien presidential election, 2004
- COVID-19 pandemic
- Coups in Niger
  - 1974
  - 1996
  - 1999
  - 2010
  - 2011 attempt
  - 2021 attempt
  - 2023

== Culture of Niger ==
Culture of Niger

- Cuisine of Niger
- Media in Niger
- National symbols of Niger
  - Coat of arms of Niger
  - Flag of Niger
  - National anthem of Niger
- Public holidays in Niger
- Association des Scouts du Niger
- World Heritage Sites in Niger

=== Art in Niger ===
- Cinema of Niger
- Music of Niger
  - Nigerien hip hop

=== Languages of Niger ===
- Languages of Niger
  - Tuareg languages
  - Songhay languages
  - Hausa language
  - Fula language
  - Kanuri language
  - Hassānīya
  - Tayart Tamajeq
  - Zarma language

=== People of Niger ===
People of Niger

==== Ethnic groups ====
- Djerma
- Fula people
- Hausa people
- Songhai people
- Tuareg
- Wodaabe
- Kanuri people

==== Notable individuals ====
- Souley Abdoulaye
- Semira Adamu
- Boukary Adji
- Ismaël Alassane
- Hamid Algabid
- Hama Amadou
- Djibo Bakary
- Amadou Cheiffou
- Amadou Cissé
- Andrée Clair
- Mano Dayak
- Hamani Diori
- Mahamadou Issoufou
- Seyni Kountché
- Aliou Mahamidou
- Tandja Mamadou
- Ibrahim Baré Maïnassara
- Ibrahim Hassane Mayaki
- Aïchatou Mindaoudou
- Mohammed Muyei
- Ide Oumarou
- Mamane Oumarou
- Mahamane Ousmane
- Nassirou Sabo
- Ali Saibou
- Ibrahim Tankary
- Daouda Malam Wanké
- Ilguilas Weila
- Moussa Yahaya

=== Religion in Niger ===
Religion in Niger

- Buddhism in Niger
- Christianity in Niger
  - Roman Catholicism in Niger
    - Diocese of Niamey
- Hinduism in Niger
- Islam in Niger

=== Sports in Niger ===
Sports in Niger

- Football in Niger
- Niger at the Olympics

== Economy and infrastructure of Niger ==
Economy of Niger

- Economic rank, by nominal GDP (2007): 140th (one hundred and fortieth)
- Agriculture in Niger
- Banking in Niger
  - Central Bank of West African States
- Communications in Niger
  - Internet in Niger
- Companies of Niger
- Currency of Niger: Franc
  - ISO 4217: XOF
- Energy in Niger
  - Power Stations in Niger
- Health care in Niger
- Mining in Niger
- Prostitution in Niger
- Stock Exchange in Niger: none – Niger is served by the regional stock exchange Bourse Régionale des Valeurs Mobilières (BRVM) in Abidjan, Cote d'Ivoire.
- Transport in Niger
  - Airports in Niger
    - Diori Hamani International Airport
    - Zinder Airport
  - Rail transport in Niger

== Education in Niger ==
Education in Niger

- Abdou Moumouni University
- Islamic University of Niger
- University of Maradi
- Universite de Tahoua
- University of Zinder

== Health in Niger ==
Health in Niger

== See also ==
- Niger
- List of international rankings
- Member state of the United Nations
- Outline of Africa
- Outline of geography
- Cure Salee
- Kel Ayr
- La Nigérienne
- Lycée La Fontaine (Niger)
- Mamar Kassey
- Sahel Academy
- Yamma Mosque
- AfricaPhonebook
- Annuaires Afrique
- Galmi Hospital
- Societe Semafo
