= SONITEL =

Nigerien national telephone and telecommunications carrier

SONITEL (Société Nigérienne des Télécommunications, 'Nigerien Telecommunications Society') was the Nigerien national telephone and telecommunications carrier from the late 1990s until the mid-2010s. It was created on 20 March 1997 as a fusion of the telecommunications arm of Nigerien Posts and Telecommunications (Office des Postes et Télécommunications) and the STIN (Société des Télécommunications Internationales du Niger, 'International Telecommunications Society of Niger'), which controlled land line telephone connections abroad. The process had begun with the passage of a law aimed at the privatisation of telecommunications (Ordonnance N°96-031 du 11 juin 1996), and was part of a larger process of internationally led privatisation of Niger's once large parastatal sector. SONITEL had the government of Niger as a majority share holder.

Following the 1999 Constitution of the Fifth Republic of Niger, SONITEL was to be privatised, and in 2001, after an unsuccessful round of offerings, the majority of the companies shares were sold. In December 2001, 51% of the company was purchased by the Sino-Libyan consortium DATAPORT, made up of ZTE and the Libyan LAAICO company. The ZTE majority consortium reportedly paid 11.8 billion FCFA, beating out FranceTelecom and SONATEL. The government of Niger continued to hold 34.11% of the company, with private investors taking 11%, the 1300 employees of SONITEL holding 3%, and France Câbles & Radio – who had been a stakeholder in STIN, 0.89%. In 2004, SONITEL's mobile phone arm was opened up to face foreign competition, but SONITEL continued to hold a monopoly on Internet communication, the .ne name registry, and international fixed line voice communication.

Following mobile phone competition, SONITEL was widely criticised for poor performance, faced a series of protests and strikes by its workers over pay and conditions, and accumulated debts of 40 billion FCFA despite a 140% increase in user fees. On 13 February 2009, the government of Niger announced it was "canceling" the privatisation of SONITEL and its subsidiary SahelCom (which handled mobile communications), although it hoped to eventually re-privatise the company. The Minister of Communications stated that the process had "failed", and the government would retain a 100% share in SONITEL, and form a new administration of the company. An attempt to sell both companies to Libya's sovereign wealth fund in 2011 failed because of the beginning of the First Libyan Civil War. The nationalisations were completed in 2012.

On 28 September 2016, the Nigerien government merged SONITEL with SahelCom to create Niger Telecoms.

== See also ==
- Communications in Niger
