= .ne =

Internet country code top-level domain for Niger

- Introduced: 24 April 1996
- TLD type: Country code top-level domain
- Status: Active
- Registry: Niger Telecoms (formerly SONITEL)
- Sponsor: Niger Telecoms (formerly SONITEL)
- Intended use: Entities connected with Niger
- Actual use: Some use in Niger; also used in typosquatting due to misspellings of .net domains, and for domain hacks.
- Structure: Registrations are made directly at the second level
- Registry website: Registration site

.ne is the Internet country code top-level domain (ccTLD) for Niger.

Unrelated to the .ne top-level domain, "ne" is sometimes used as a second-level domain within other country-code domains, in which registrants may register second-level domains of the form .ne.xx, where xx is the ccTLD. Two examples are Japan (.ne.jp) and South Korea. .ne domain names can be registered via certain accredited registrars.

== See also ==
- Internet in Niger
- ISO 3166-2:NE
- List of Internet top-level domains
