= Geography of Niger =

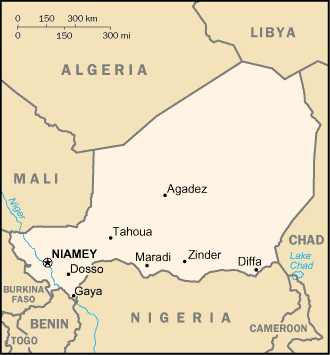
- Continent: Africa
- Region: Western Africa
- Coordinates: 16°00′N 08°00′E
- Area: Ranked 21st
  - Total: 1,266,700 km^{2} (489,100 sq mi)
  - Land: 99.98%
  - Water: 0.02%
- Coastline: 0 km (0 mi)
- Borders: Land boundaries: Algeria 951 km Benin 277 km Burkina Faso 622 km Chad 1,196 km Libya 342 km Mali 838 km Nigeria 1,608 km
- Irrigated land: 736.6 km² (2005)
- Total renewable water resources: 33.65 km^{3} (2011)
- Highest point: Mont Idoukal-n-Taghès, 2,022 m
- Lowest point: Niger River, 200 m
- Climate: Hot desert; hot semi-arid in extreme southwest
- Terrain: Mostly desert plains and sand dunes, hills in the north
- Natural resources: Uranium, coal, iron ore, tin, phosphates, gold, molybdenum, gypsum, salt, petroleum
- Natural hazards: Recurring droughts
- Environmental issues: Overgrazing, soil erosion, deforestation, poaching

Niger is a landlocked nation in West Africa located along the border between the Sahara and Sub-Saharan regions. Its geographic coordinates are longitude 16°N and latitude 8°E.

== Area ==
- Total: 1,267,000 km^{2} (489,191 sq mi)
  - country rank in the world: 21st
- Land: 1,266,700 km^{2} (489,076 sq mi)
- Water: 300 km^{2} (116 sq mi)

Area comparative
- Australia comparative: slightly smaller than the Northern Territory
- Canada comparative: slightly less than twice the size of Manitoba
- United States comparative: slightly more than three times the size of California
- EU comparative: approximately twice the size of France

== Brief history ==
Niger, which attained independence from France in 1960 was under military rule until 1991. On public demand Gen. Ali Saibou held multiparty elections in 1993 and soon democracy came into effect in 1993. However, political unrest was caused by Col. Ibrahim Bare who staged a coup in 1996, but he later died in a counter insurgency operations by officers of the military establishment in 1999. This was followed by fresh elections for a democratic rule, and Mamadou Tandja assumed power in December 1999. Tandja, who won the elections in 2004 and in 2009, wanted to bring about a constitutional amendment to extend his tenure as president. However, in February 2010, he was removed from the post of the president in a coup engineered by the military and the constitution was annulled. Soon after, in 2011, elections were held and Mahamadou Issoufou got elected as the president and was sworn in April 2011. Niger's problem with rebellious groups continued during 2007 and 2008. Rebellion was controlled. However, its security problems with its neighbors such as Libya, Nigeria and Mali have been a cause for concern.

== Geography ==
Niger, with a land area of 1.267 million km^{2}, is a land locked country which is bounded with a land boundary of 5,834 km by seven countries: Algeria (951 km), Benin (277 km), Burkina Faso (622 km), Chad (1,196 km), Libya (342 km), Mali 838 km, and Nigeria (1,608) km.

=== Regions ===
Niger is divided into 7 Regions (French: régions; singular – région). Each department's capital is the same as its name.

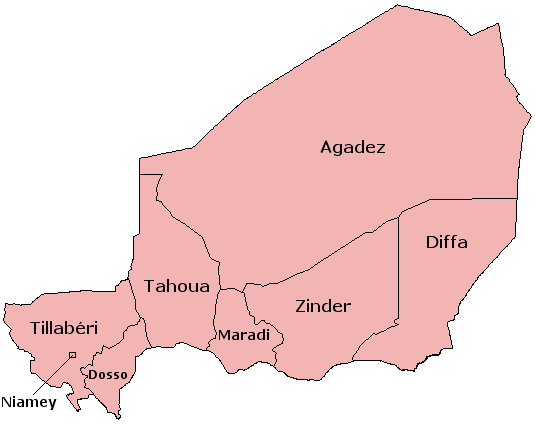
A clickable map of Niger exhibiting its seven regions.

Region	Area (km^{2})	Population (2012 census)
Agadez	667,799	487,620
Diffa	156,906	593,821
Dosso	33,844	2,037,713
Maradi	41,796	3,402,094
Niamey	402	1,026,848
Tahoua	113,371	3,328,365
Tillabéri	97,251	2,722,842
Zinder	155,778	3,539,764

- The national capital, Niamey, comprises a capital district.

=== Departments ===
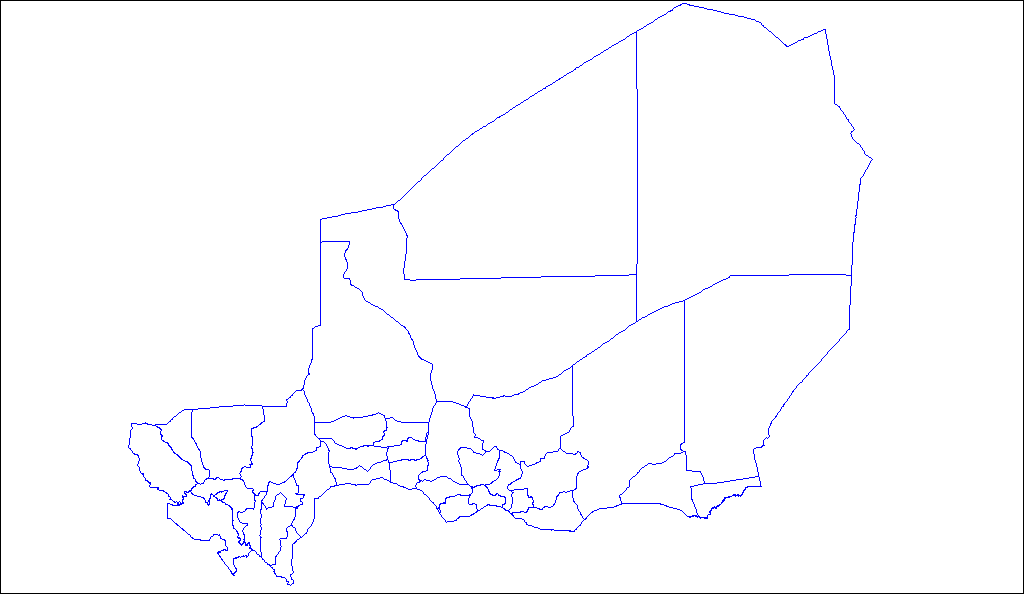
The pre-2011 36 Departments of Niger. A further 27 were then carved out of existing divisions.

The Regions of Niger are subdivided into 63 Departments.

=== Communes ===
The 63 Departments are broken down into Communes. As of 2006 there were 265 communes, including communes urbaines (Urban Communes: centred in or as subdivisions of cities of over 10000), communes rurales (Rural Communes) centred in cities of under 10,000 and/or sparsely populated areas, and a variety of traditional (clan or tribal) bodies amongst semi-nomadic populations.

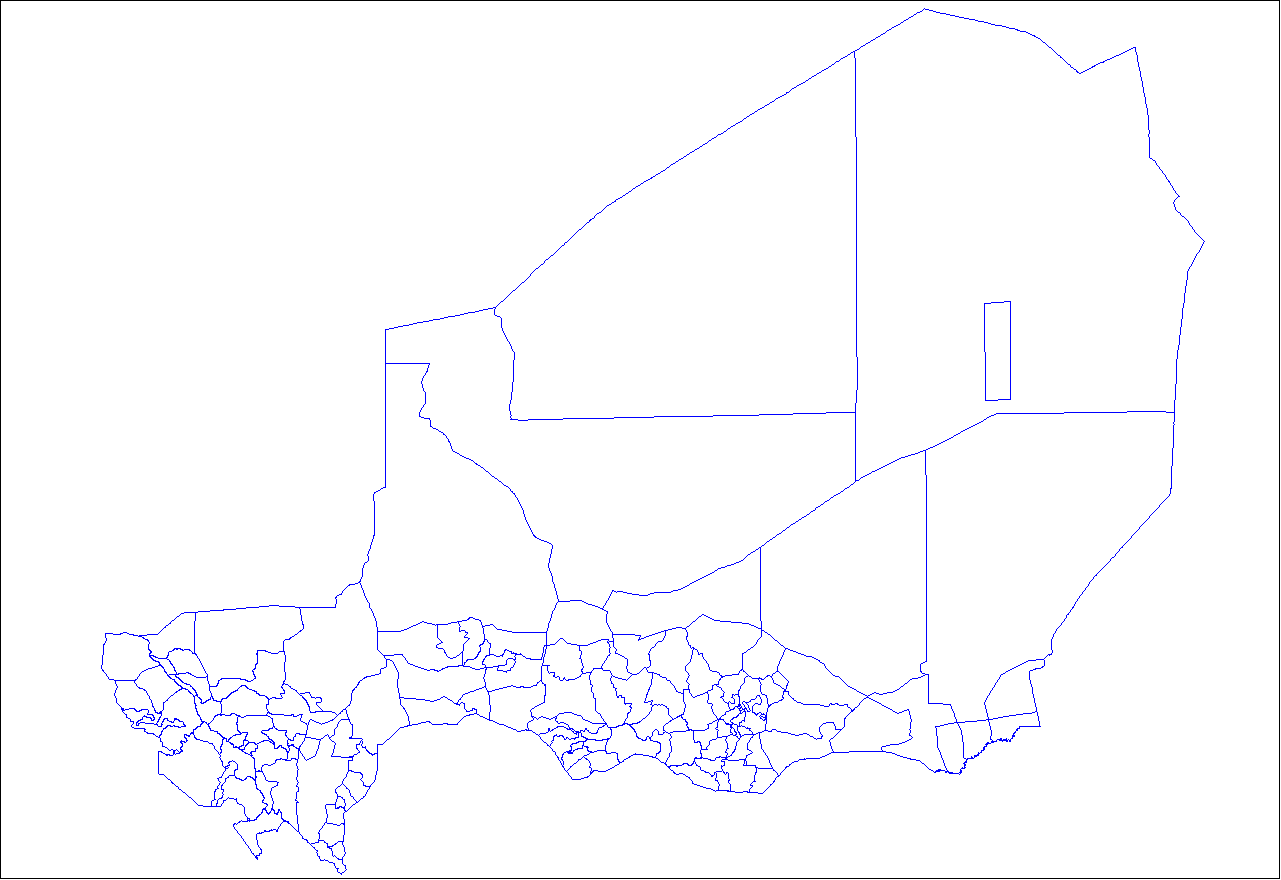
Communes of Niger

=== Cities ===
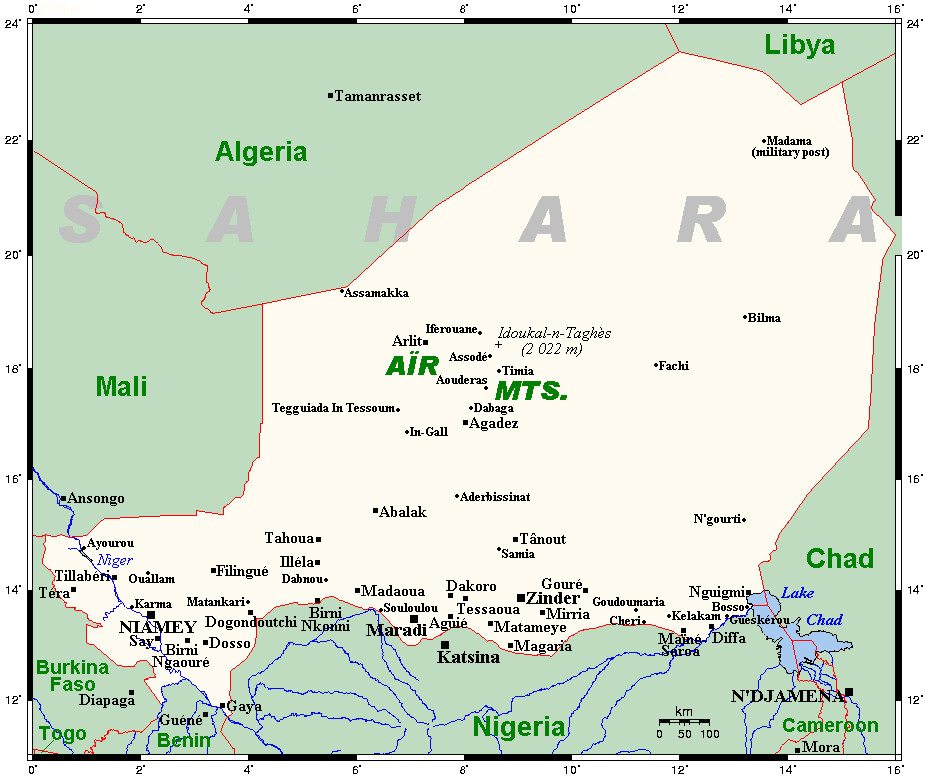
Niger's cities, main towns and other centres

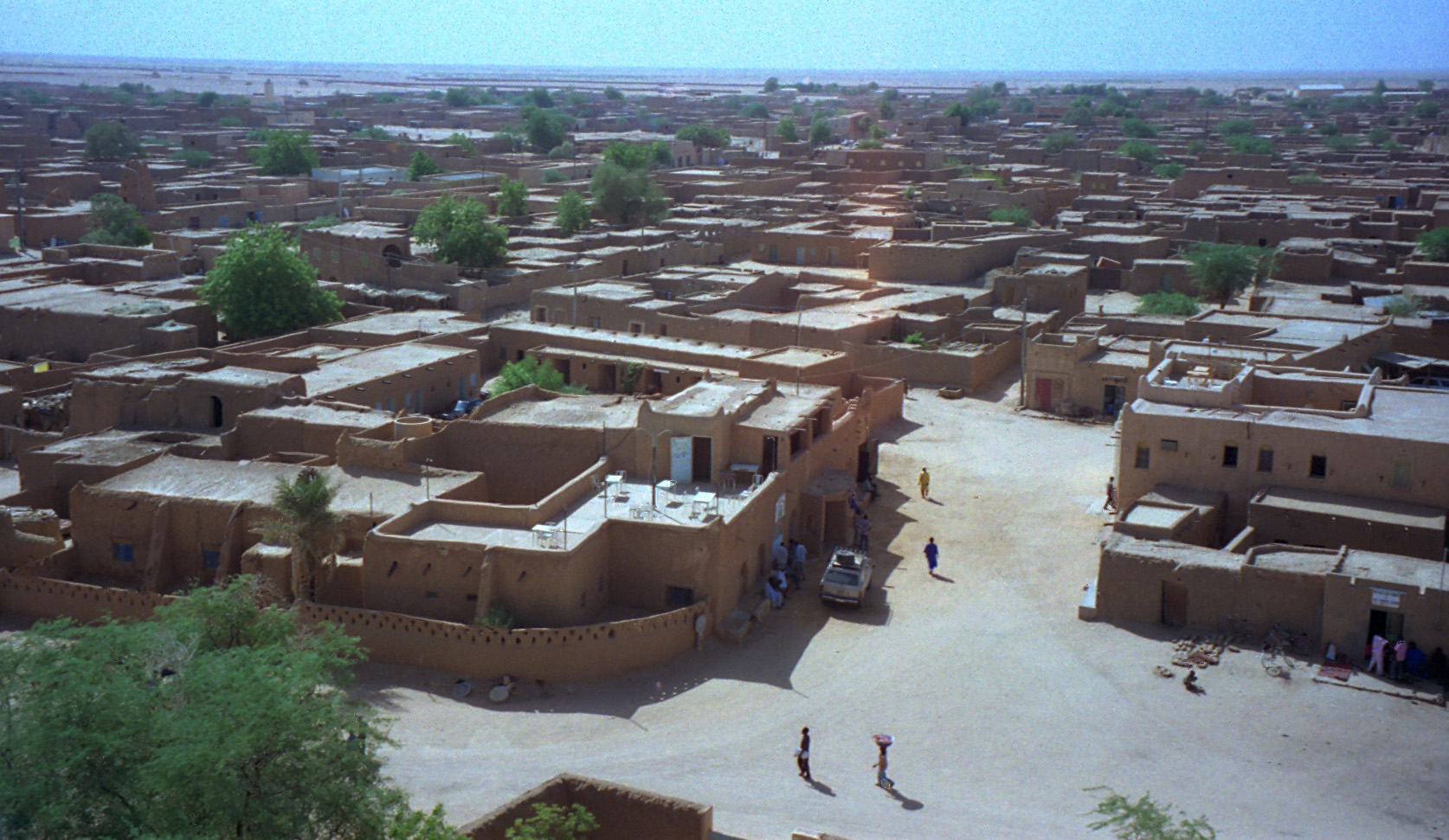
Agadez is the largest city in central Niger, with a population of 88,569 (2005 census)

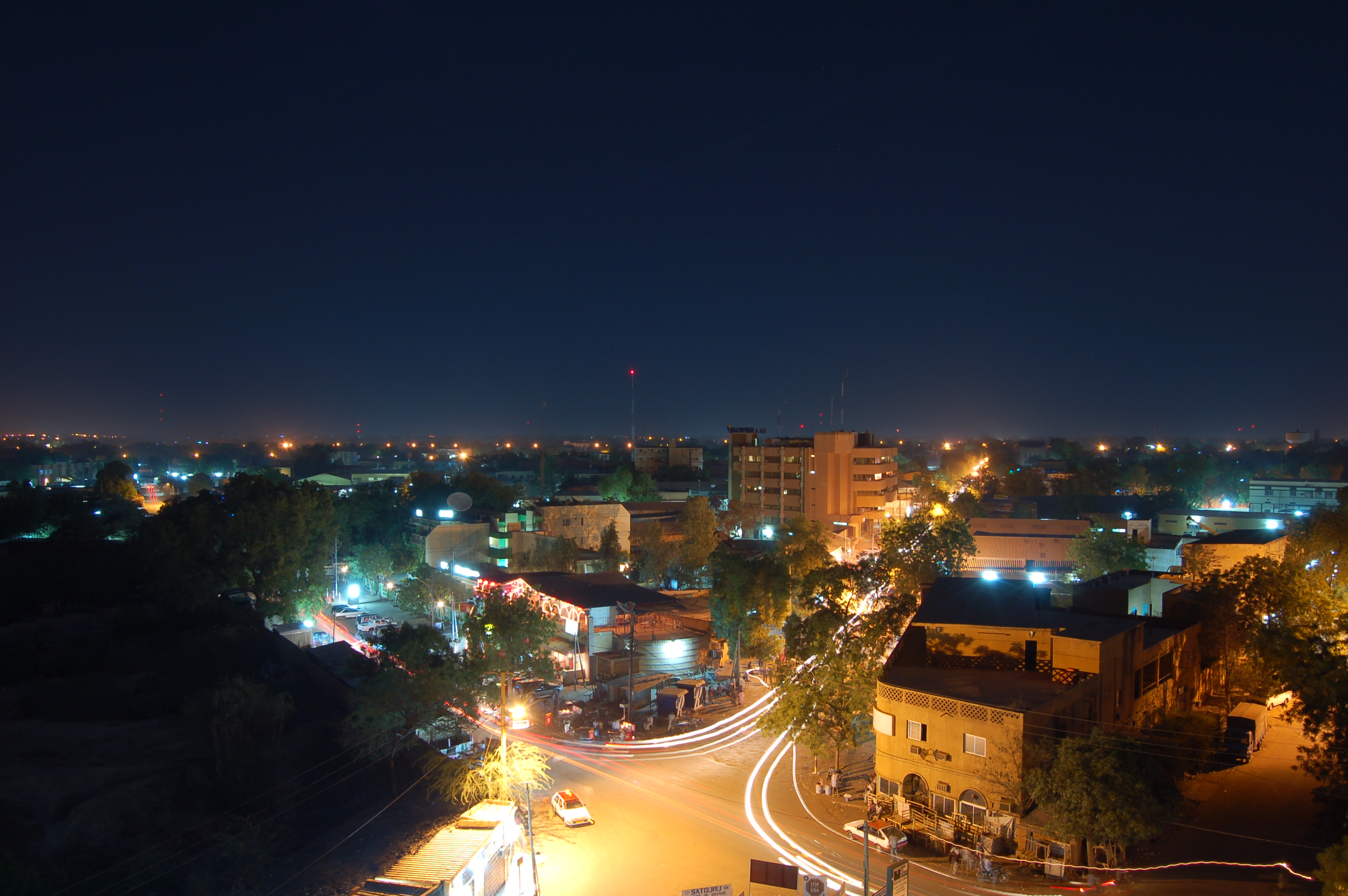
Niamey, the Capital of Niger

=== Roadways ===
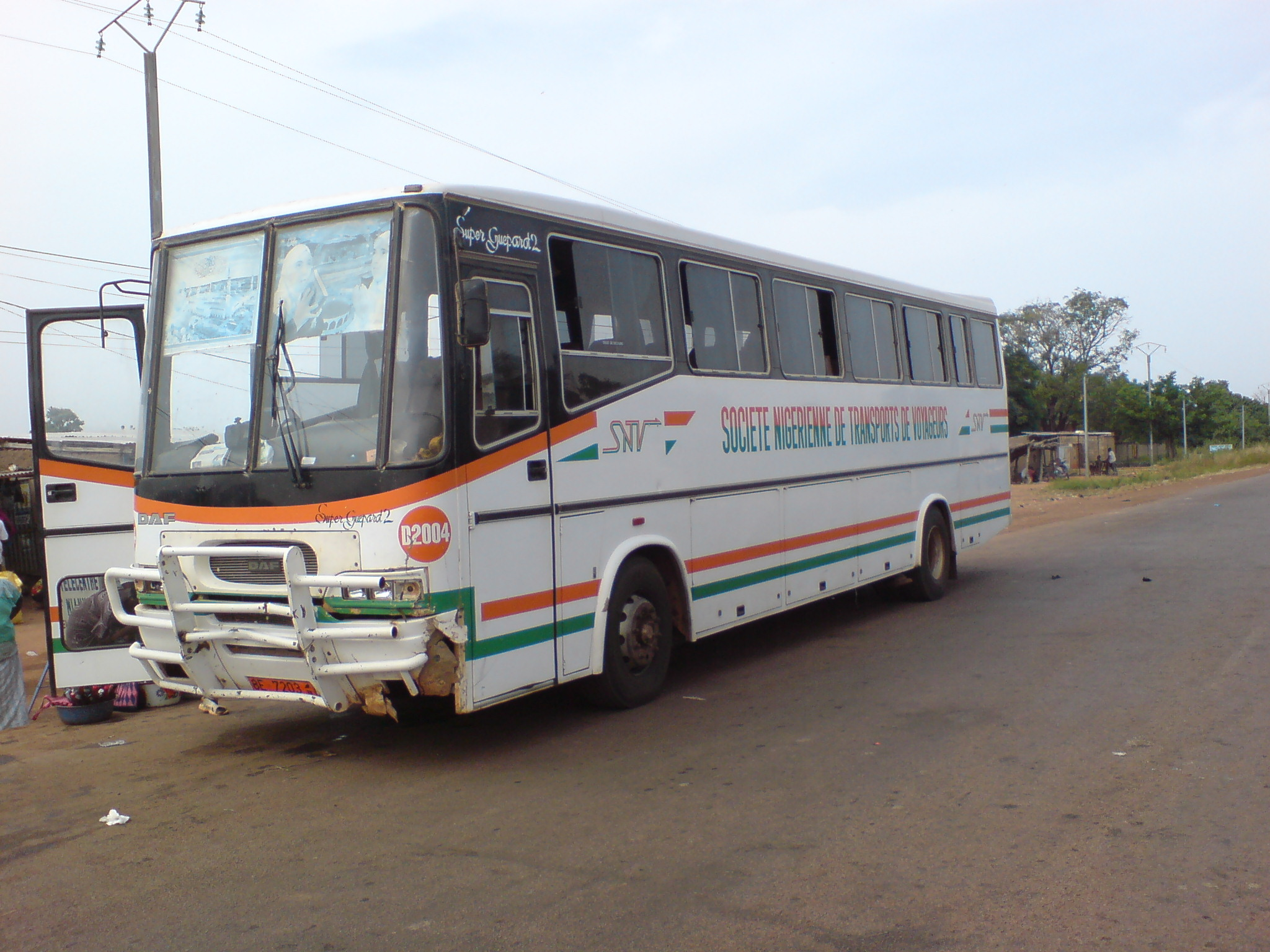
A state-run SNTV coach running between Ouagadougou (Burkina Faso) and Niamey, Niger

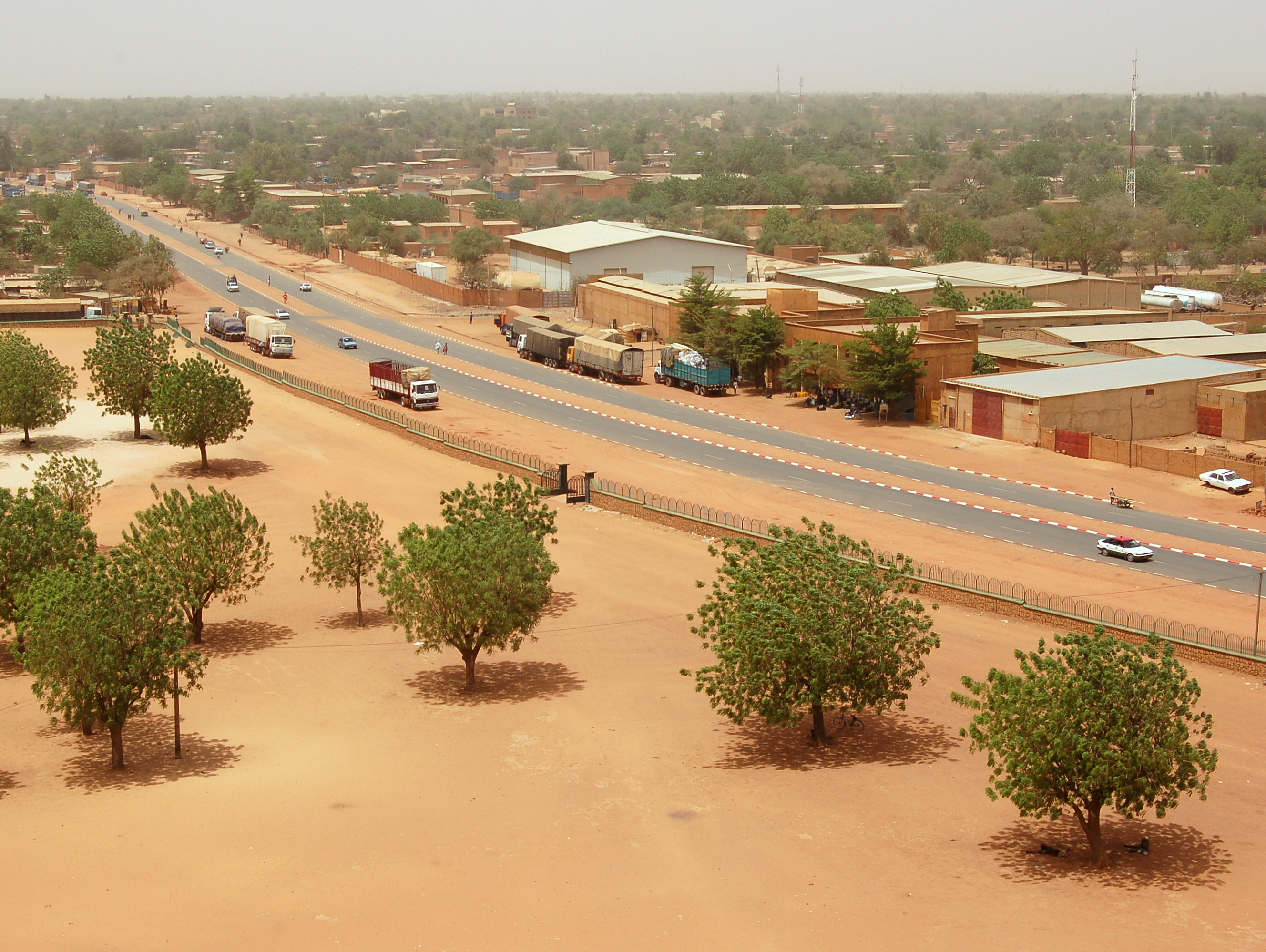
Truck and car traffic along Boulevard Mali Bero, Niamey, Niger

== Physical geography ==
=== Agricultural geography ===
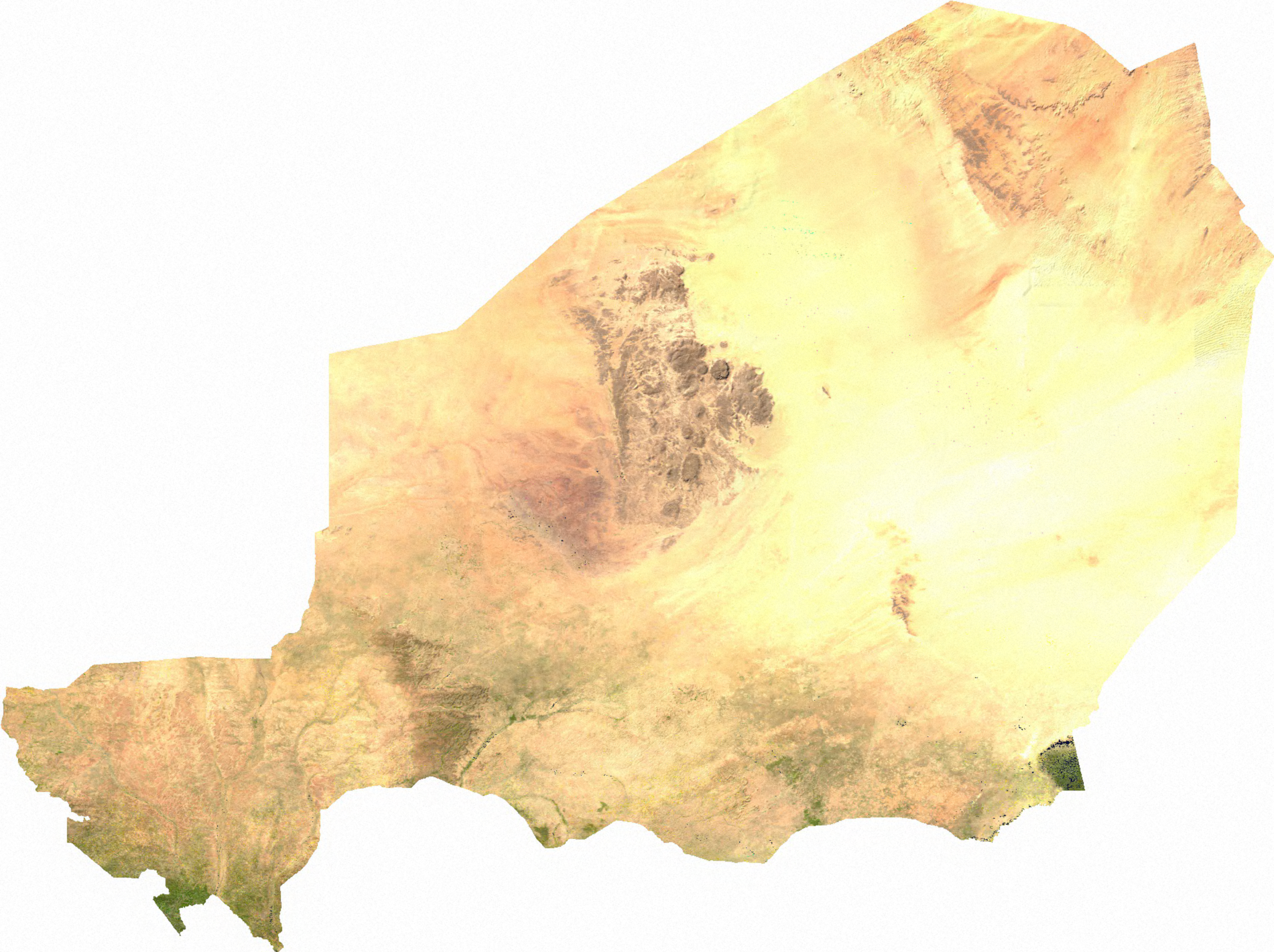
A satellite image depicting the physical geography of Niger

Some of the land in Niger is used as arable land (660 km^{2} of land in Niger is irrigated) and as pasture. There are some forests and woodland. The table below describes land use in Niger, as of 2011.

Land use
Use	Percentage of Area
Arable land	11.79
Permanent crops	0.05
Other	88.16

=== Climate ===
Niger map of Köppen climate classification

Niger's climate is largely hot and dry, with most of the country in a desert region. The terrain is predominantly desert plains and sand dunes. There are also large plains in the south and hills in the north. In the southwest, there is a hot semi-arid climate near the edges of the Niger River Basin. There are small pockets of a tropical savanna climate on the southern border. Lake Chad at the southeast corner of the country is shared between Niger, Nigeria, Chad, and Cameroon.

Climate data for Niamey, Niger (1961–1990, extremes: 1961–2035)
Month	Jan	Feb	Mar	Apr	May	Jun	Jul	Aug	Sep	Oct	Nov	Dec	Year
Record high °C (°F)	—	44.0 (111.2)	45.0 (113.0)	45.6 (114.1)	45.1 (113.2)	43.5 (110.3)	41.0 (105.8)	39.6 (103.3)	41.8 (107.2)	41.2 (106.2)	40.7 (105.3)	40.0 (104.0)	45.6 (114.1)
Mean daily maximum °C (°F)	32.5 (90.5)	35.7 (96.3)	39.1 (102.4)	40.9 (105.6)	40.3 (104.5)	37.2 (99.0)	34.0 (93.2)	33.0 (91.4)	34.4 (93.9)	37.8 (100.0)	36.2 (97.2)	33.3 (91.9)	36.2 (97.2)
Daily mean °C (°F)	24.3 (75.7)	27.3 (81.1)	30.9 (87.6)	33.8 (92.8)	34.0 (93.2)	31.5 (88.7)	29.0 (84.2)	27.9 (82.2)	29.0 (84.2)	30.8 (87.4)	27.9 (82.2)	25.0 (77.0)	29.3 (84.7)
Mean daily minimum °C (°F)	16.1 (61.0)	19.0 (66.2)	22.9 (73.2)	26.5 (79.7)	27.7 (81.9)	25.7 (78.3)	24.1 (75.4)	23.2 (73.8)	23.6 (74.5)	24.2 (75.6)	19.5 (67.1)	16.7 (62.1)	22.4 (72.3)
Record low °C (°F)	12.6 (54.7)	14.3 (57.7)	18.0 (64.4)	21.6 (70.9)	22.6 (72.7)	20.5 (68.9)	20.0 (68.0)	20.2 (68.4)	20.3 (68.5)	15.8 (60.4)	13.0 (55.4)	12.6 (54.7)	12.6 (54.7)
Average precipitation mm (inches)	0.0 (0.0)	0.0 (0.0)	3.9 (0.15)	15.7 (0.62)	44.7 (1.76)	78.8 (3.10)	154.3 (6.07)	170.8 (6.72)	99.2 (3.91)	9.7 (0.38)	0.7 (0.03)	0.0 (0.0)	577.8 (22.74)
Average precipitation days (≥ 1.0 mm)	0.0	0.0	0.2	0.8	2.9	5.9	9.9	12.2	7.4	1.6	0.1	0.0	41
Average relative humidity (%)	22	17	18	27	42	55	67	74	73	53	34	27	42
Mean monthly sunshine hours	280	264	264	251	257	251	238	203	228	285	285	276	3,082
Source 1: Deutscher Wetterdienst
Source 2: Danish Meteorological Institute

Climate data for Agadez, Niger (1961-1990 normals)
Month	Jan	Feb	Mar	Apr	May	Jun	Jul	Aug	Sep	Oct	Nov	Dec	Year
Record high °C (°F)	37 (99)	40 (104)	41 (106)	47 (117)	50 (122)	46 (115)	48 (118)	43 (109)	41 (106)	40 (104)	42 (108)	40 (104)	50 (122)
Mean daily maximum °C (°F)	27.9 (82.2)	31.1 (88.0)	35.0 (95.0)	39.2 (102.6)	41.3 (106.3)	41.3 (106.3)	39.1 (102.4)	37.9 (100.2)	38.9 (102.0)	37.1 (98.8)	32.4 (90.3)	29.0 (84.2)	35.8 (96.4)
Daily mean °C (°F)	19.8 (67.6)	22.5 (72.5)	26.7 (80.1)	31.2 (88.2)	33.7 (92.7)	33.8 (92.8)	32.1 (89.8)	31.0 (87.8)	31.7 (89.1)	29.4 (84.9)	24.3 (75.7)	21.0 (69.8)	28.1 (82.6)
Mean daily minimum °C (°F)	11.7 (53.1)	13.9 (57.0)	18.3 (64.9)	23.1 (73.6)	26.0 (78.8)	26.4 (79.5)	25.1 (77.2)	24.2 (75.6)	24.5 (76.1)	21.7 (71.1)	16.2 (61.2)	12.8 (55.0)	20.3 (68.5)
Record low °C (°F)	−1 (30)	7 (45)	6 (43)	13 (55)	20 (68)	19 (66)	18 (64)	17 (63)	18 (64)	12 (54)	5 (41)	−1 (30)	−1 (30)
Average precipitation mm (inches)	0.0 (0.0)	0.0 (0.0)	0.1 (0.00)	2.0 (0.08)	5.5 (0.22)	10.4 (0.41)	35.2 (1.39)	49.7 (1.96)	8.2 (0.32)	0.3 (0.01)	0.0 (0.0)	0.0 (0.0)	111.4 (4.39)
Mean monthly sunshine hours	297.6	280.0	294.5	288.0	297.6	270.0	288.3	285.2	285.0	306.9	303.0	294.5	3,490.6
Source 1: NOAA
Source 2: Weatherbase

Climate data for Arlit
Month	Jan	Feb	Mar	Apr	May	Jun	Jul	Aug	Sep	Oct	Nov	Dec	Year
Mean daily maximum °C (°F)	26.9 (80.4)	30.1 (86.2)	34.3 (93.7)	38.6 (101.5)	41.2 (106.2)	41.5 (106.7)	39.8 (103.6)	38.6 (101.5)	39 (102)	37 (99)	32.3 (90.1)	28.4 (83.1)	35.6 (96.2)
Daily mean °C (°F)	18.8 (65.8)	21.7 (71.1)	25.9 (78.6)	30.5 (86.9)	33.4 (92.1)	34.2 (93.6)	32.8 (91.0)	31.9 (89.4)	31.8 (89.2)	29.3 (84.7)	24.2 (75.6)	20.5 (68.9)	27.9 (82.2)
Mean daily minimum °C (°F)	10.8 (51.4)	13.3 (55.9)	17.5 (63.5)	22.4 (72.3)	25.7 (78.3)	27 (81)	25.9 (78.6)	25.3 (77.5)	24.6 (76.3)	21.6 (70.9)	16.1 (61.0)	12.7 (54.9)	20.2 (68.5)
Average precipitation mm (inches)	0 (0)	0 (0)	0 (0)	1 (0.0)	1 (0.0)	5 (0.2)	11 (0.4)	18 (0.7)	5 (0.2)	0 (0)	0 (0)	0 (0)	41 (1.5)
Source: Climate-Data.org, altitude: 429 metres

=== Current issues ===
Current environmental issues in Niger include overgrazing, soil erosion, deforestation, desertification, recurring droughts, and endangered wildlife populations (such as the African elephant, Northwest African cheetah, West African giraffe, and Addax), which are threatened because of poaching and habitat destruction.

==== Natural hazards ====
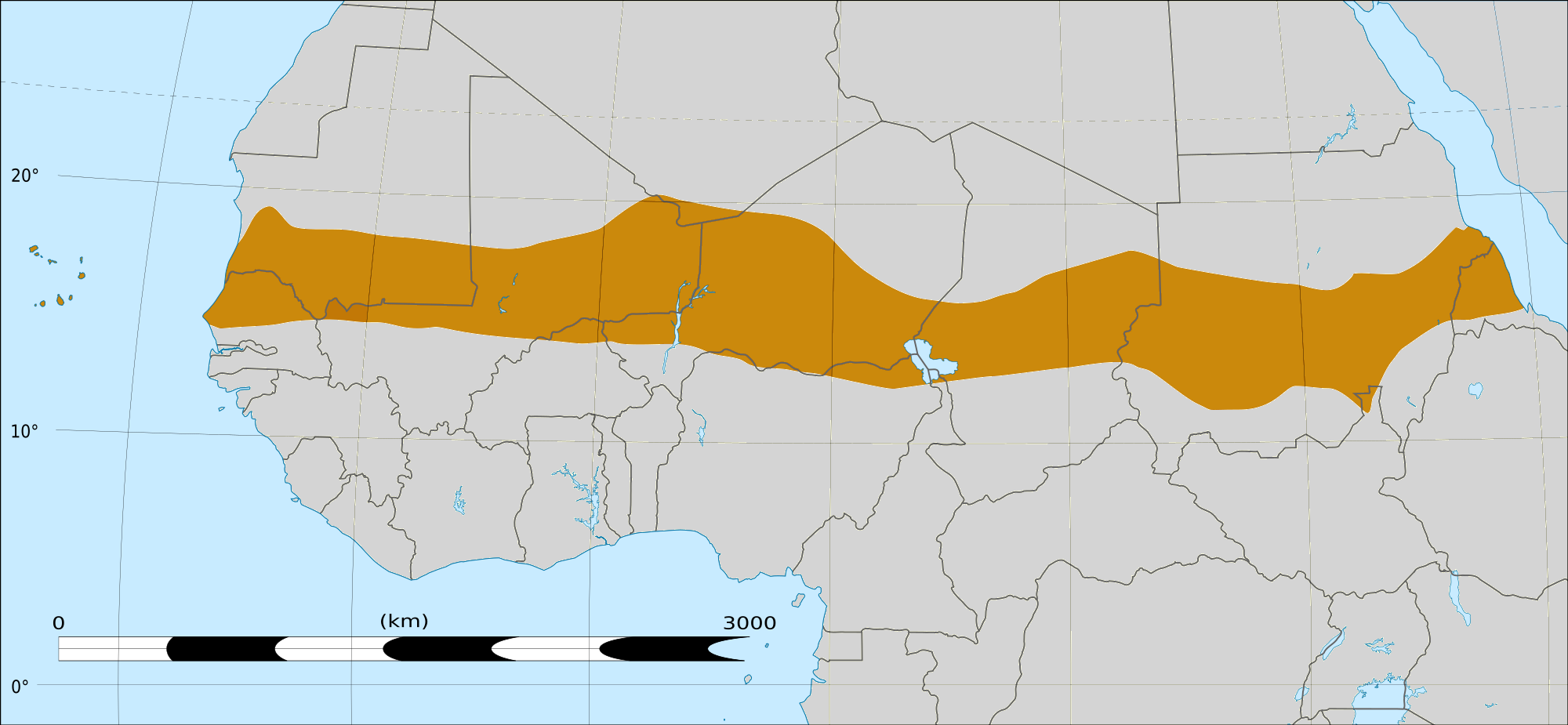
The Sahel region is a belt up to 1,000 km wide that spans Africa from the Atlantic Ocean to the Red Sea

Recurring droughts are a serious challenge for Niger. The 2012 Sahel drought, along with failed crops, insect plagues, high food prices and conflicts is currently affecting Niger causing a hunger crisis. Many families in Niger, still recovering from the 2010 Sahel famine, are being affected by the 2012 Sahel drought.

The 2005–06 Niger food crisis created a severe, but localized food security crisis in the regions of northern Maradi, Tahoua, Tillabéri, and Zinder of Niger from 2005 to 2006. It was caused by an early end to the 2004 rains, desert locust damage to some pasture lands, high food prices, and chronic poverty.

=== Extreme points ===
- Northernmost point: Tripoint with Algeria and Libya, Agadez Region: 23°31'N.
- Southernmost point: Benin/Niger/Nigeria tripoint, Dosso Region: 11°42'N
- Easternmost point: border with Chad, Agadez Region: 16°00'E
- Westernmost point: border with Mali and Burkina Faso, Tillabéri Region: 0°07'E
- Highest point: Mont Idoukal-n-Taghès, Aïr Massif, Agadez Region:2,022 m (6,634 ft)
- Lowest point: Niger River at Nigeria border, Dosso Region: 200 m (656 ft)
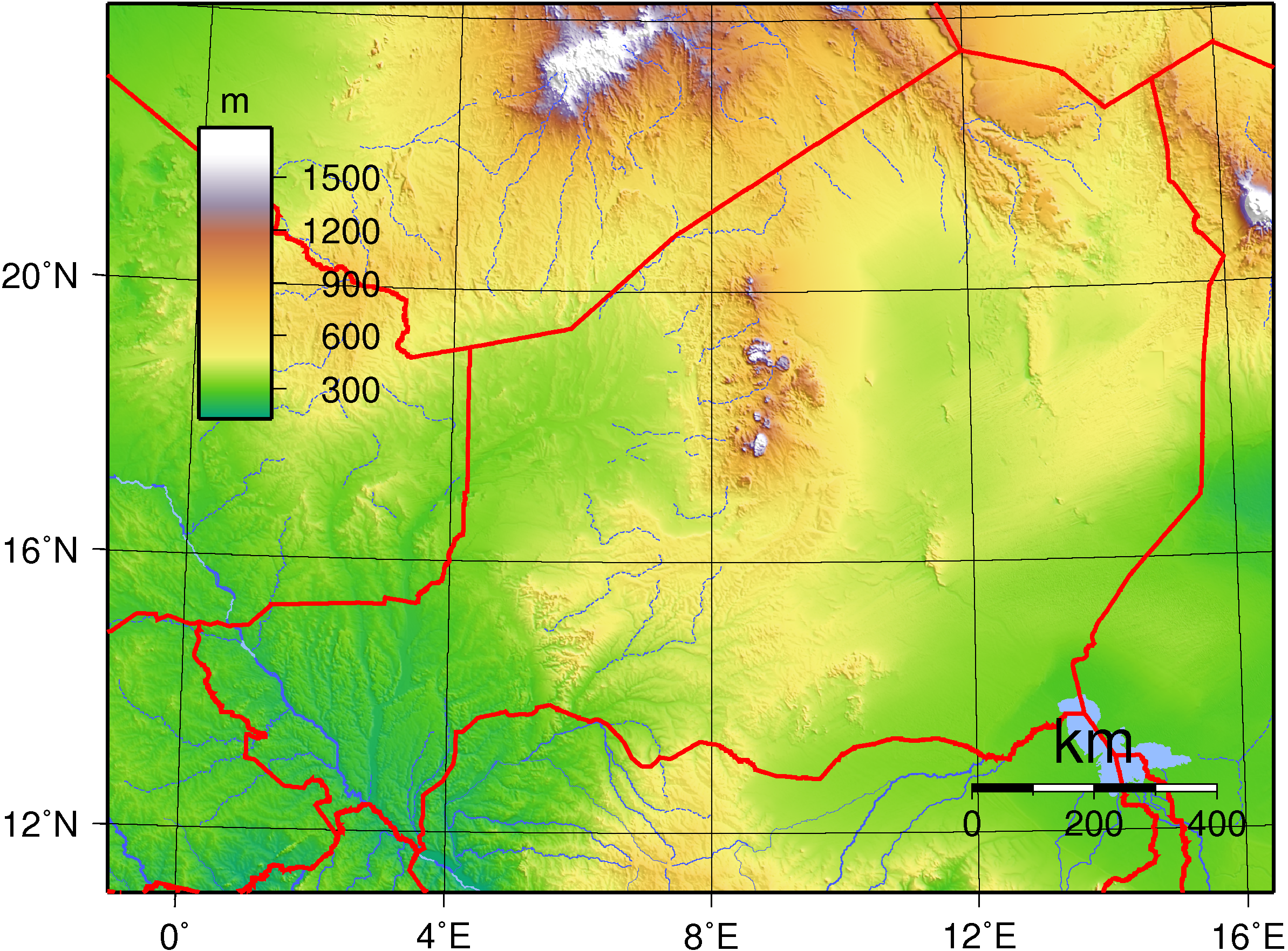
Topography of Niger

=== International agreements ===
Niger is a party to the following agreements:

- Biodiversity
- Climate Change
- Desertification
- Endangered species
- Environmental Modification
- Hazardous Wastes
- Nuclear Test Ban
- Ozone Layer Protection
- Sustainable development goals
- Wetlands

Niger has signed, but not ratified the Kyoto Protocol and Law of the Sea.

=== National parks and reserves ===
IUCN Protected area in Niger

Niger's protected areas comprise about 7.7 percent of the total land area. Six of the reserves are fully categorized under the International Union for Conservation of Nature (IUCN).

=== Natural resources ===
Niger possesses the following natural resources:

- Uranium
- Coal
- Iron ore
- Tin
- Phosphates
- Gold
- Molybdenum
- Gypsum
- Salt
- Oil

=== Waterways ===
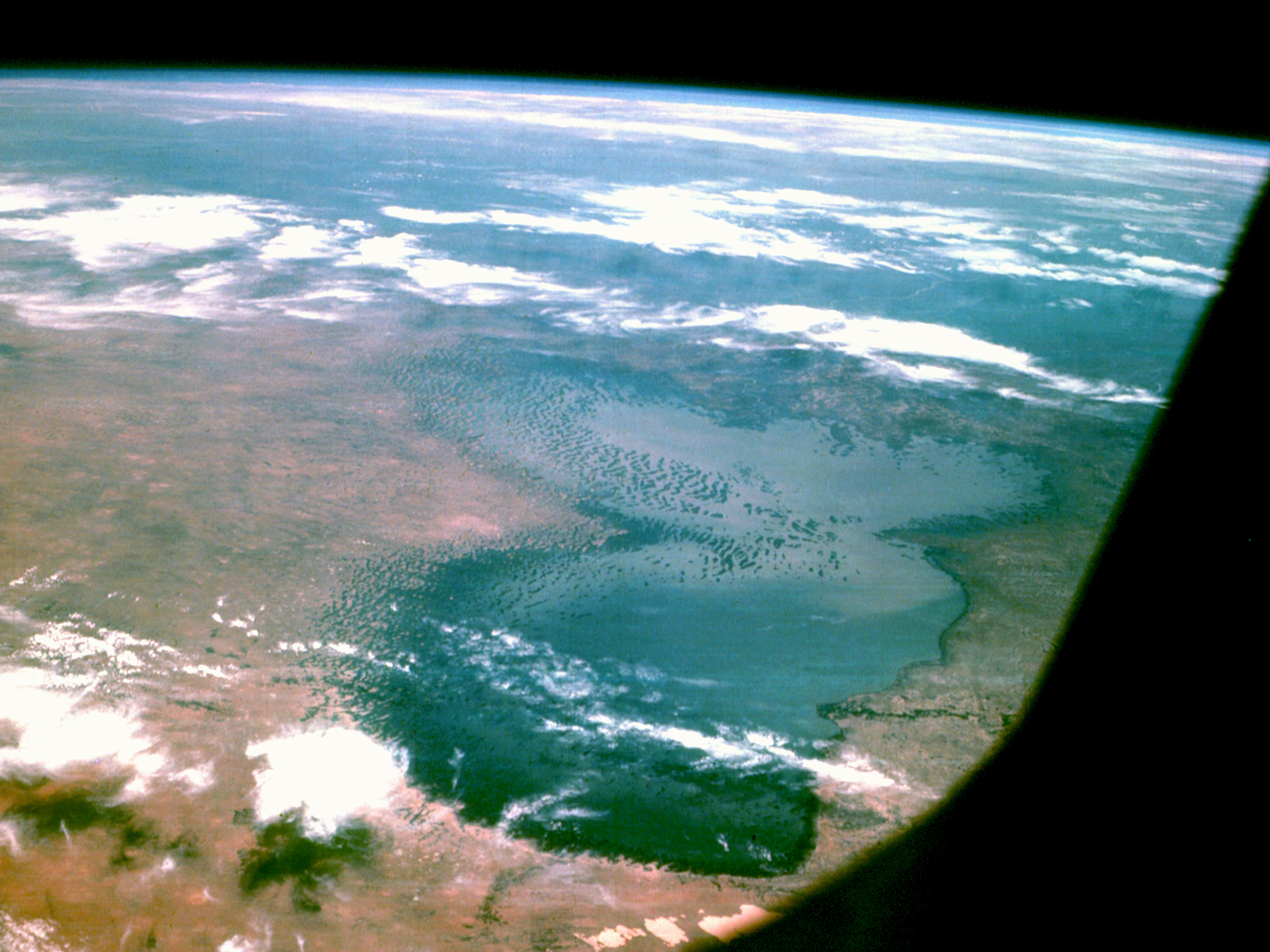
Lake Chad as seen from Apollo 7

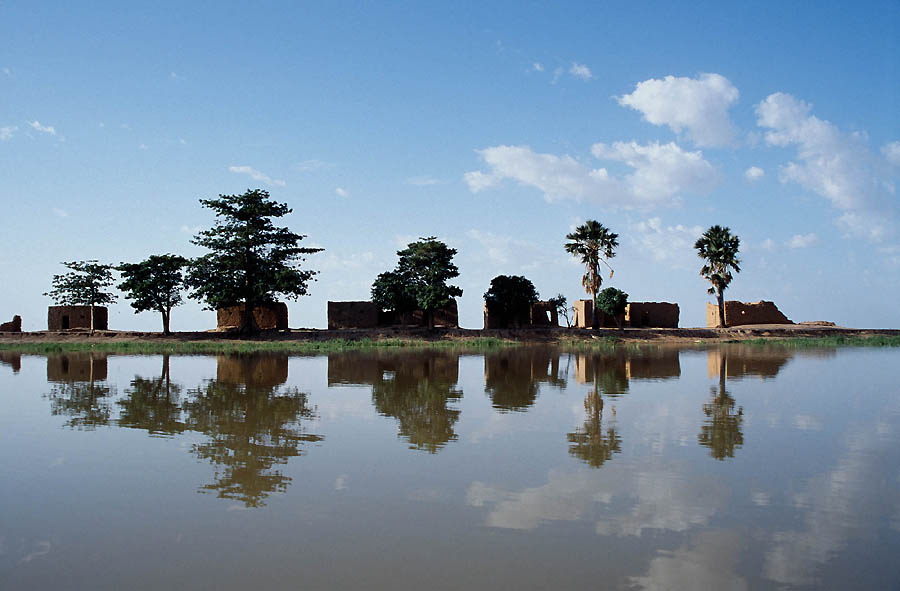
Mud houses on the center island at Lake Debo, a wide section of the Niger River

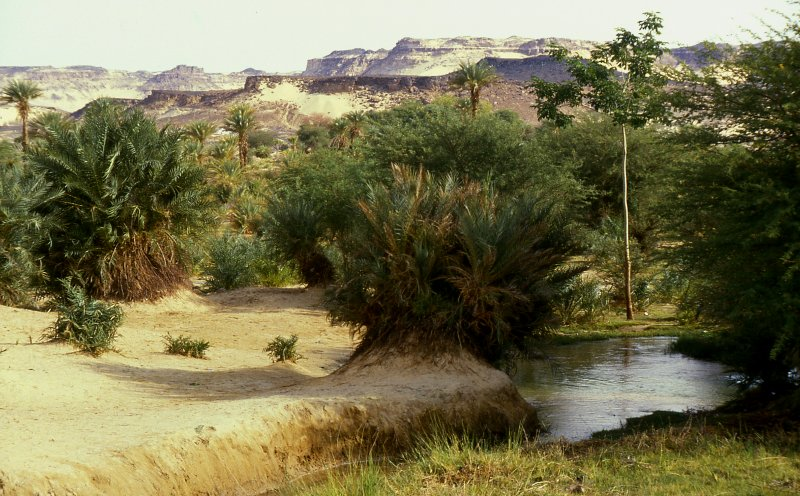
The oasis at Bilma, Niger

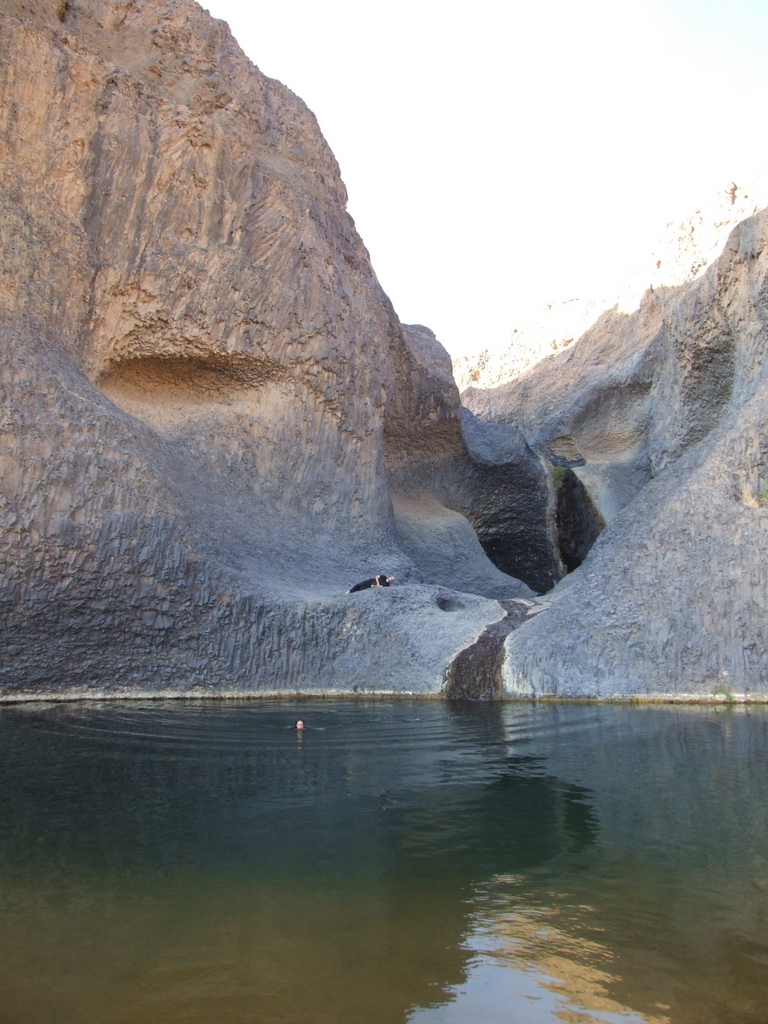
The Timia oasis

=== Wildlife ===
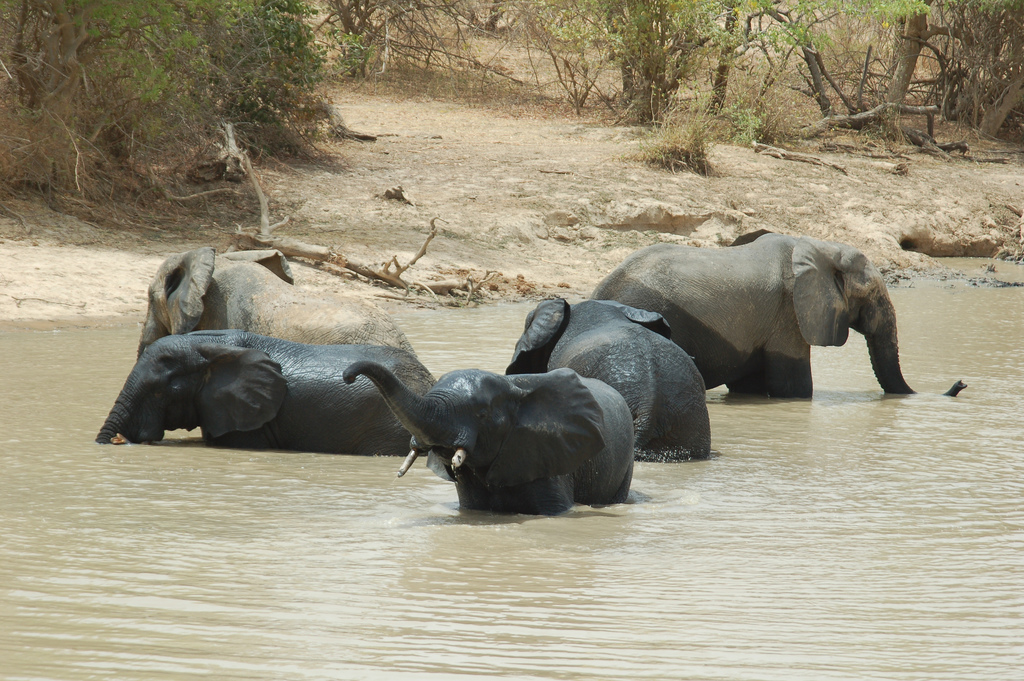
African bush elephants photographed in the Niger section of the W National Park complex of protected areas.

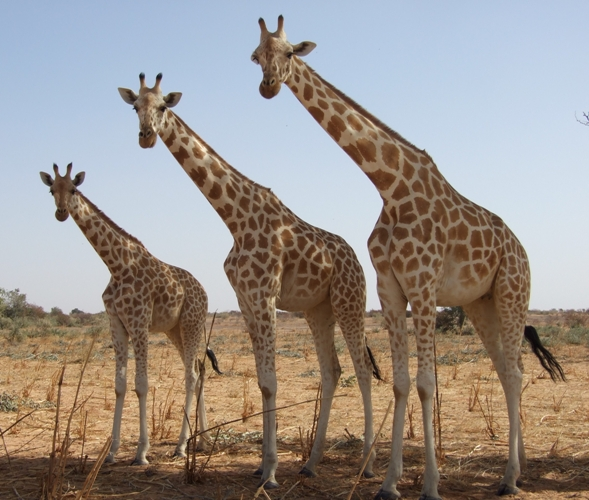
West African giraffes in Kouré, Niger.

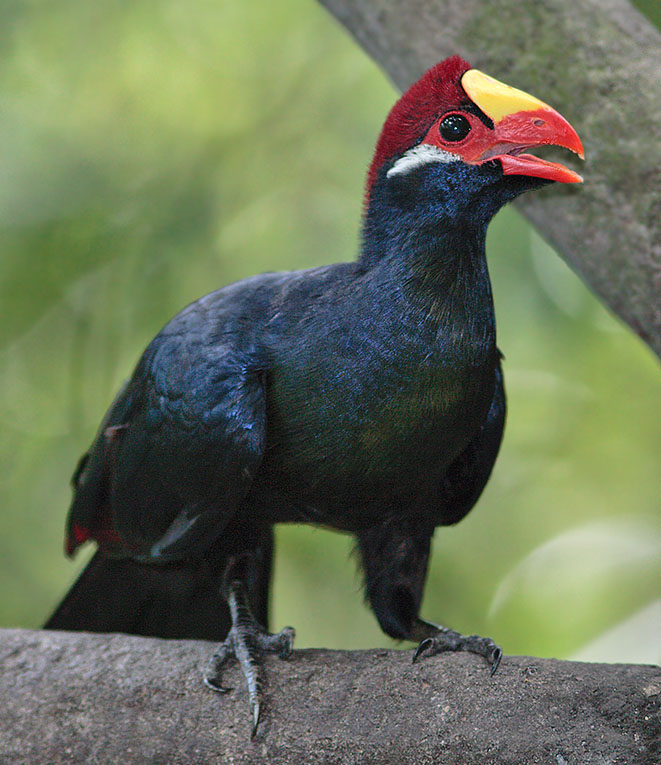
A Violet turaco.

== Political geography ==
Surrounded by seven other countries, Niger has a total of 5,834 km of borders. The longest border is with Nigeria to the south, at 1,608 km. This is followed by Chad to the east (1,196 km), Algeria to the north-northwest (951 km), and Mali to the west (838 km). Niger also has short borders in its far southwest frontier (Burkina Faso at 622 km and Benin at 277 km) and to the north-northeast (Libya at 342 km).

== See also ==
- Departments of Niger
- List of national parks of Niger
- Outline of Niger
- Regions of Niger
