= Ourofan =

Ourofan Ourofané
- Location within Niger
- Coordinates: 14°5′0″N 8°8′0″E
- Country: Niger
- Region: Maradi Region
- Department: Tessaoua Department
- Commune: Ourofan
- Elevation: 368 m (1,207 ft)

Ourofan (var. Ourofané) is a town in Maradi Region, Tessaoua Department south central Niger. With a mixed population of pastoral Kel Owey Tuareg, Fulani and Hausa peoples, Ourofan survives as a farming community and stop on seasonal and animal herding and trade routes. The town, historically within the Sahel, is today on the verge of the encroaching Sahara desert.

== International contacts ==
The Belgian city of Chimay has a development partnership with Ourofan.
