= Niger Telecoms =

Public telecommunication company in Niger

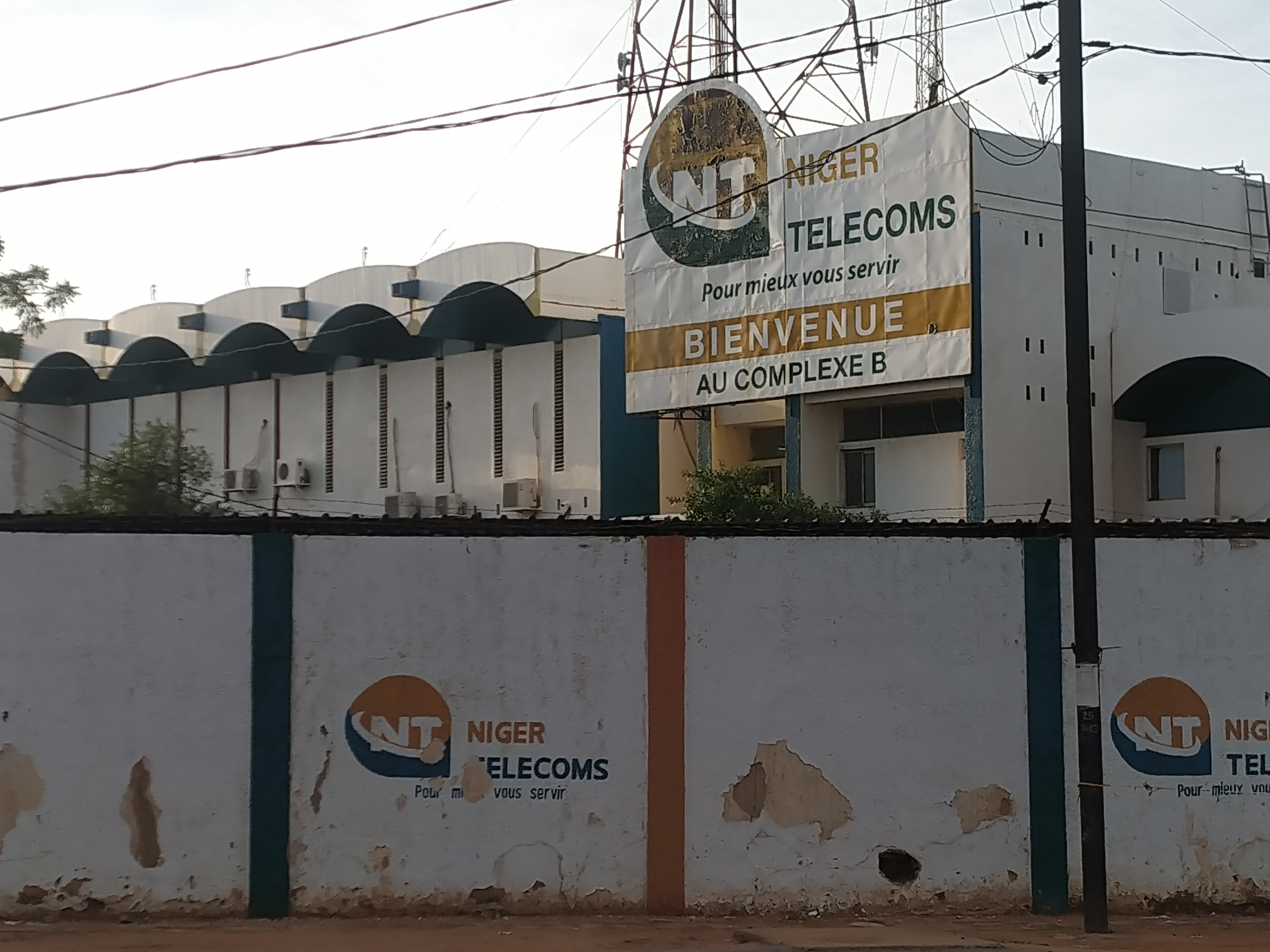
- Company type: State-owned enterprise
- Industry: Telecommunications
- Predecessors: SONITEL; SahelCom
- Founded: 28 September 2016; 9 years ago
- Headquarters: Niamey, Niger
- Area served: Niger
- Owner: Nigerien Government
- Website: https://www.nigertelecoms.ne

Niger Telecoms is the Nigerien national telephone and telecommunications carrier. It was created on 28 September 2016 as a fusion of SONITEL, which handled fixed telephony, and SahelCom, which controlled mobile telephony and connections. After privatisations in 2001, both merged companies had faced financial difficulties, and had been renationalised by the government for that reason in 2012. Niger Telecoms had capital of 23.5 billion CFA francs upon its formation.

== See also ==
- Telecommunications in Niger
