= Concerns and controversies at the 2016 Summer Olympics =

A number of notable controversies and concerns associated with the 2016 Summer Olympics in Rio de Janeiro, Brazil, emerged which were the subject of public debate and media commentary.

== Preexisting issues ==
=== Zika virus ===
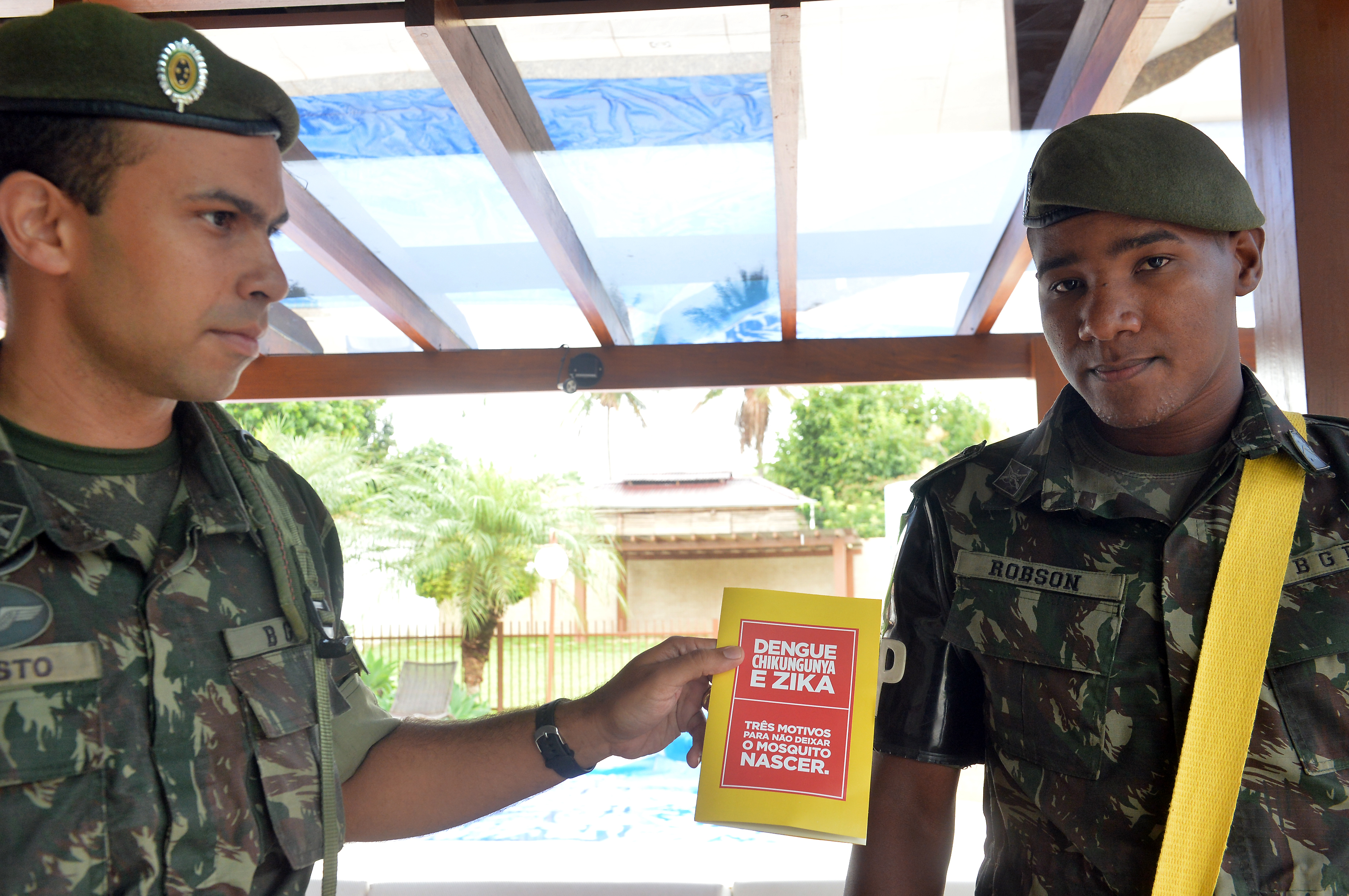
The Brazilian Army has sent more than 200,000 troops to go "house to house" in the campaign against Zika-carrying mosquitoes.

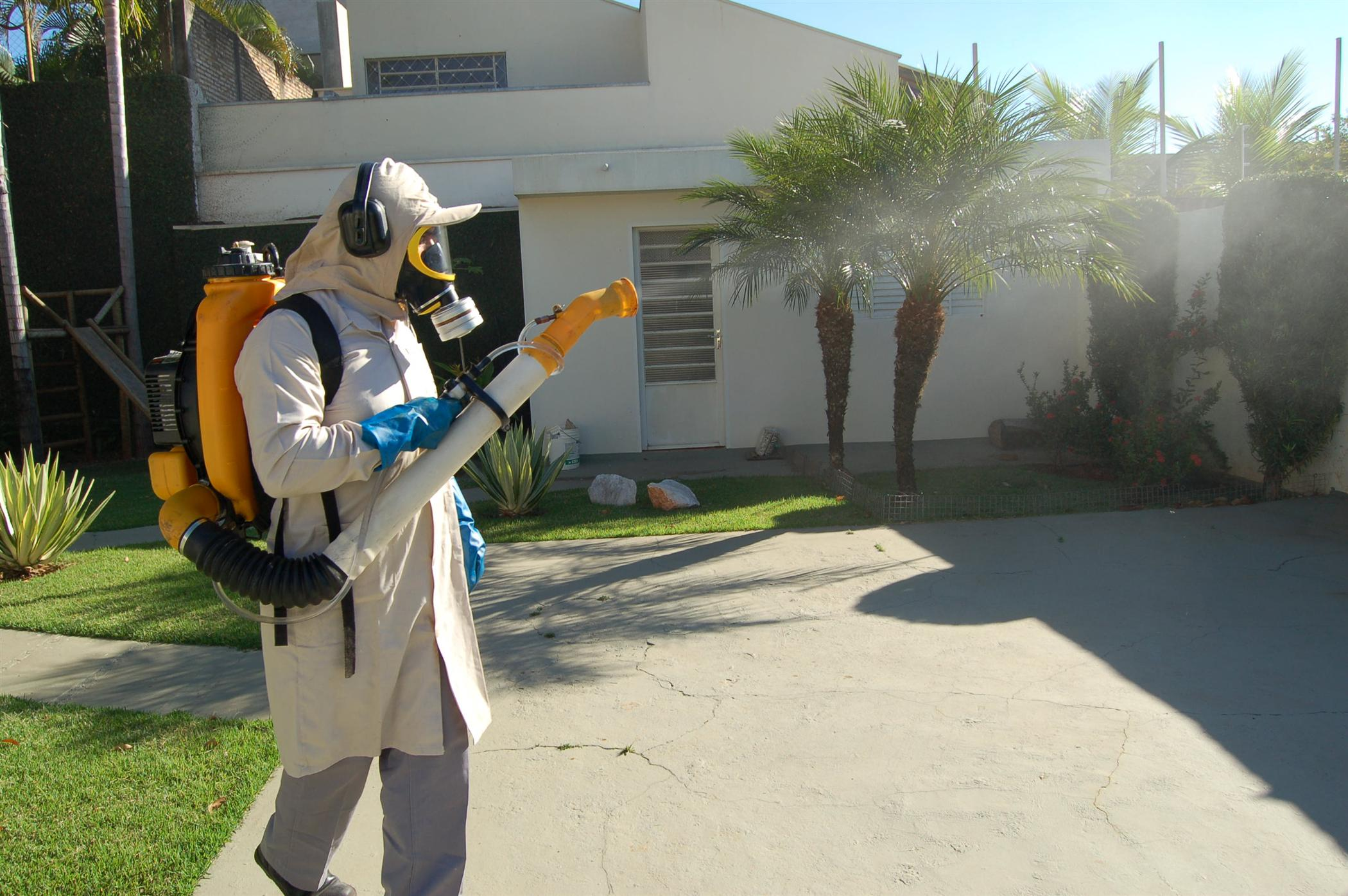
Agent for endemic diseases of the city of Votuporanga, São Paulo, Brazil

An outbreak of the mosquito-borne Zika virus in Brazil raised fears regarding its potential impact on athletes and visitors. Organizers plan to perform daily inspections of Olympic venues to prevent puddles of stagnant water that allow mosquitoes to breed. Zika virus transmission was also attributed to inefficient sewage treatment in the area, and sewage treatment is being improved in preparation for the Games.

There had been numerous calls for the Games to be postponed, warning that the anticipated attendance of 500,000 international visitors could cause the virus to rapidly spread outside of the country. In the first quarter of 2016, there were also more cases of the mosquito-borne Dengue fever than in 2015 alone. Dr. Amir Attaran of the University of Ottawa, writing for the Harvard Public Health Review, noted that Rio had the highest concentration of Zika infections out of all Brazilian states. He argued that the Olympics could result in a "global catastrophe" of Zika outbreaks, and asserted that it was "socially irresponsible" and "ethically questionable" to allow them to continue. On the other hand, it has been argued that the threat of Zika will not be as high during the Games, citing computer models and simulations, as well as the fact that the Games will be held during Southern Hemisphere winter, which is when mosquitoes are least active. The initial outbreak of Zika in Brazil occurred during the winter months, but in Northeastern states near the equator, where there is no winter season throughout the year. Tom Frieden, director of the U.S. Centers for Disease Control and Prevention, stated that "there is no public health reason to cancel or delay the Olympics".

In May 2016, a group of 150 physicians and scientists sent an open letter to the World Health Organization, calling upon them to, according to co-author Arthur Caplan, have "an open, transparent discussion of the risks of holding the Olympics as planned in Brazil". The WHO dismissed the request, stating that "cancelling or changing the location of the 2016 Olympics will not significantly alter the international spread of Zika virus", and that there was "no public health justification" for postponing them.

Many athletes declined to participate in the Games citing concerns over Zika, including Milos Raonic, Tomas Berdych, Simona Halep, Karolína Plíšková, The Bryan brothers, Jason Day, Tejay van Garderen, Branden Grace, Dustin Johnson, Shane Lowry, Rory McIlroy, Marc Leishman, Charl Schwartzel, Angelo Que and Jordan Spieth. As the majority of the athletes that have pulled out were golfers, International Golf Federation president Peter Dawson believed that there was "something of an overreaction" to Zika, stating that "I think I should say now that I don't think it's appropriate for us to discuss individual cases, especially as they're generally decisions that have been taken on health grounds. Speaking collectively though, there is no doubt that the number of withdrawals hasn't shed golf in the best light. We have to accept that. But we do understand why these individual decisions have been taken".

On 2 September 2016, the WHO reported that there were no confirmed cases of Zika among athletes or visitors during the Olympics.

=== Sanitation ===
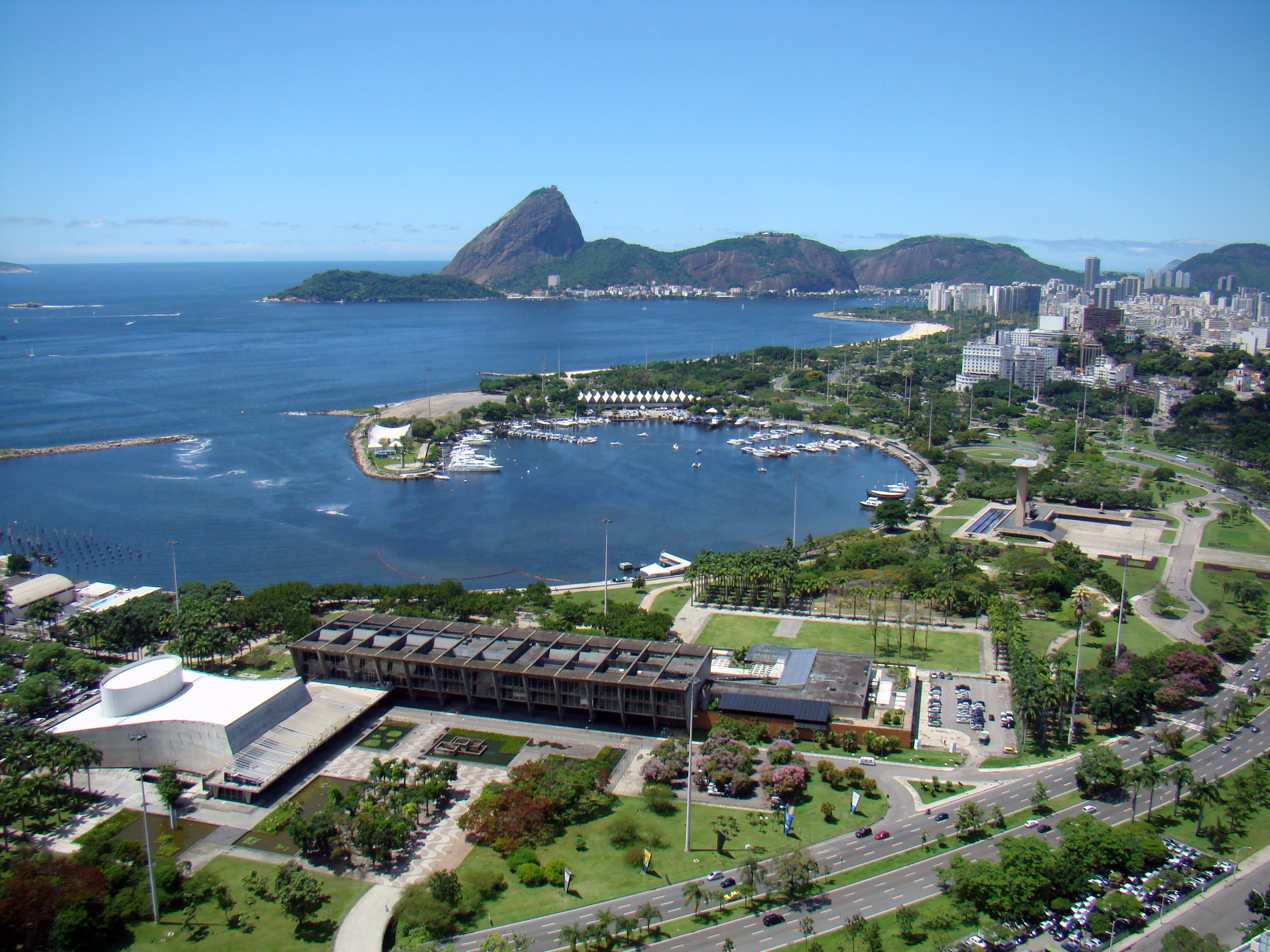
Marina da Glória, locale of sailing competitions

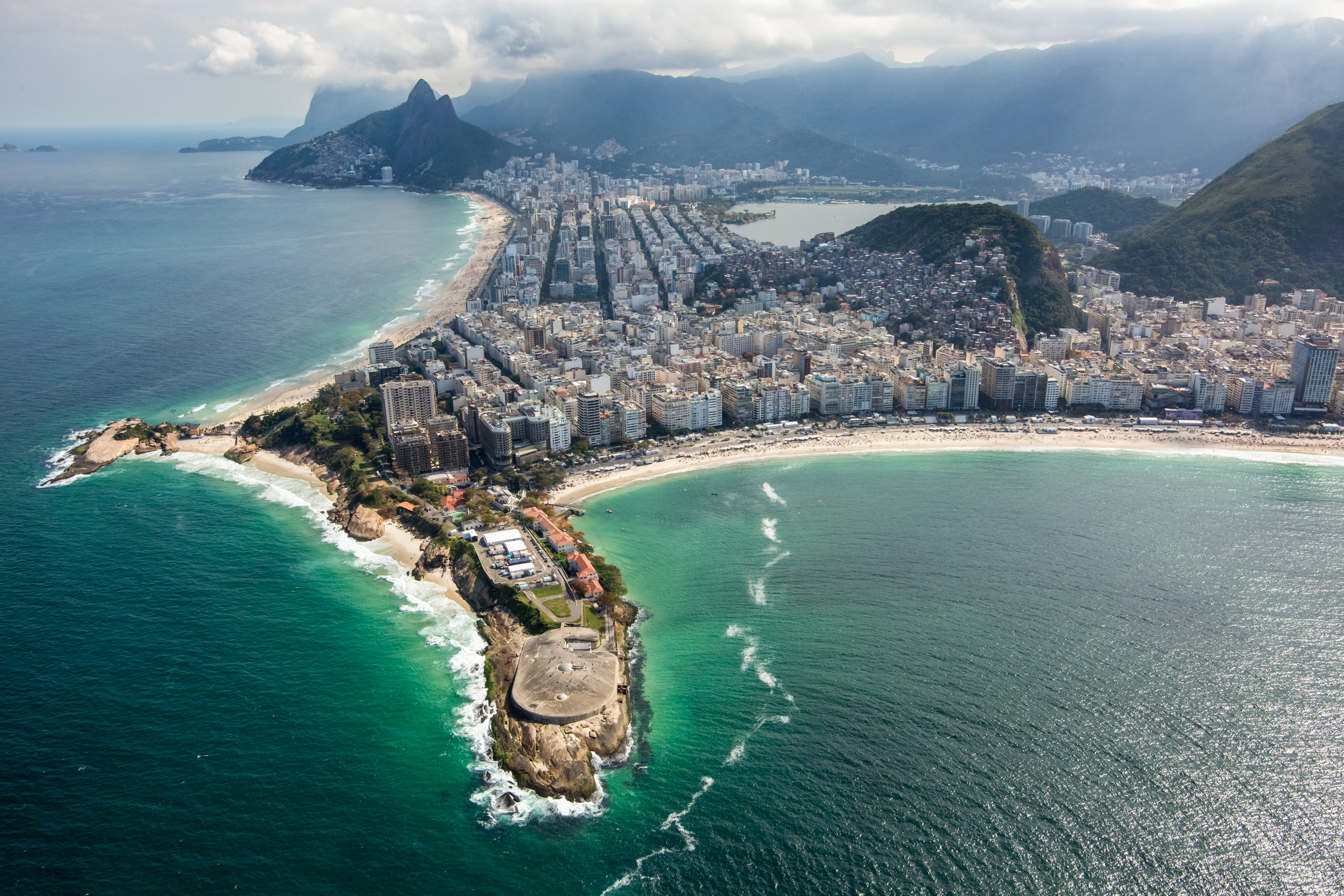
The Fort Copacabana which hosted the cycling road race (start and finish), marathon swimming and triathlon events.

The Guanabara Bay, whose waters were to be used for sailing and windsurfing competitions, is heavily polluted. Among the chief causes of the pollution are uncollected trash fed into the bay via polluted rivers and shanty towns along the coast. Pollution of the Guanabara has been a long-term issue; although officials promised at the Earth Summit in 1992 that they would begin to address the pollution, previous attempts to do so were insufficient. As an aspect of their bid for the Games, Rio once again committed to making efforts towards cleaning the bay. However, some of these proposed initiatives faced budgetary issues.

Before these efforts, only 17% of Rio's sewage was treated; this raw sewage also leaked into the bay. In 2011, a new consortium took over the operations of Rio's sewage system in its western "AP5" zone as a legacy project for the Games. The consortium committed to building out upgrades to the sewage system that would reduce the amount of sewage flowing into the bay by 17 million gallons by the end of 2016. However, adoption of the new system was slow and inconsistent because of concerns by residents over installation costs. Although Mayor of Rio Eduardo Paes stated that the city might not be able to reach its goal of having 80% of sewage treated, at least 60% of sewage was treated by March 2016, with a projected goal of 65% of sewage being treated by the time the Olympics start.

The pollution also led to concerns over how it would affect competitions and the health of athletes, especially concerns that the polluted waterways could cause athletes to be unable to compete. In 2014, sailors training in the bay told The New York Times that they had to contend with dodging various forms of trash floating in its waters, ranging from tires to dog carcasses. That December, researchers from the Oswaldo Cruz Foundation found drug-resistant "super bacteria"—KPC enzymes—in samples of water from the Carioca River. They warned that "carriers can take these resistant bacteria back to their own environments and to other people, resulting in a cycle of dissemination". In 2015, it was found that because of open drainage and severe pollution, the incidence of "disease-causing viruses" in Rio's waterways was measured to be "1.7 million times the level of what would be considered hazardous on a Southern California beach". Following a test event in August 2015, German sailor Erik Heil was found to have been infected with multi-resistant bacteria that are believed to have been connected to the sewage.

=== Political instability and economic crisis ===
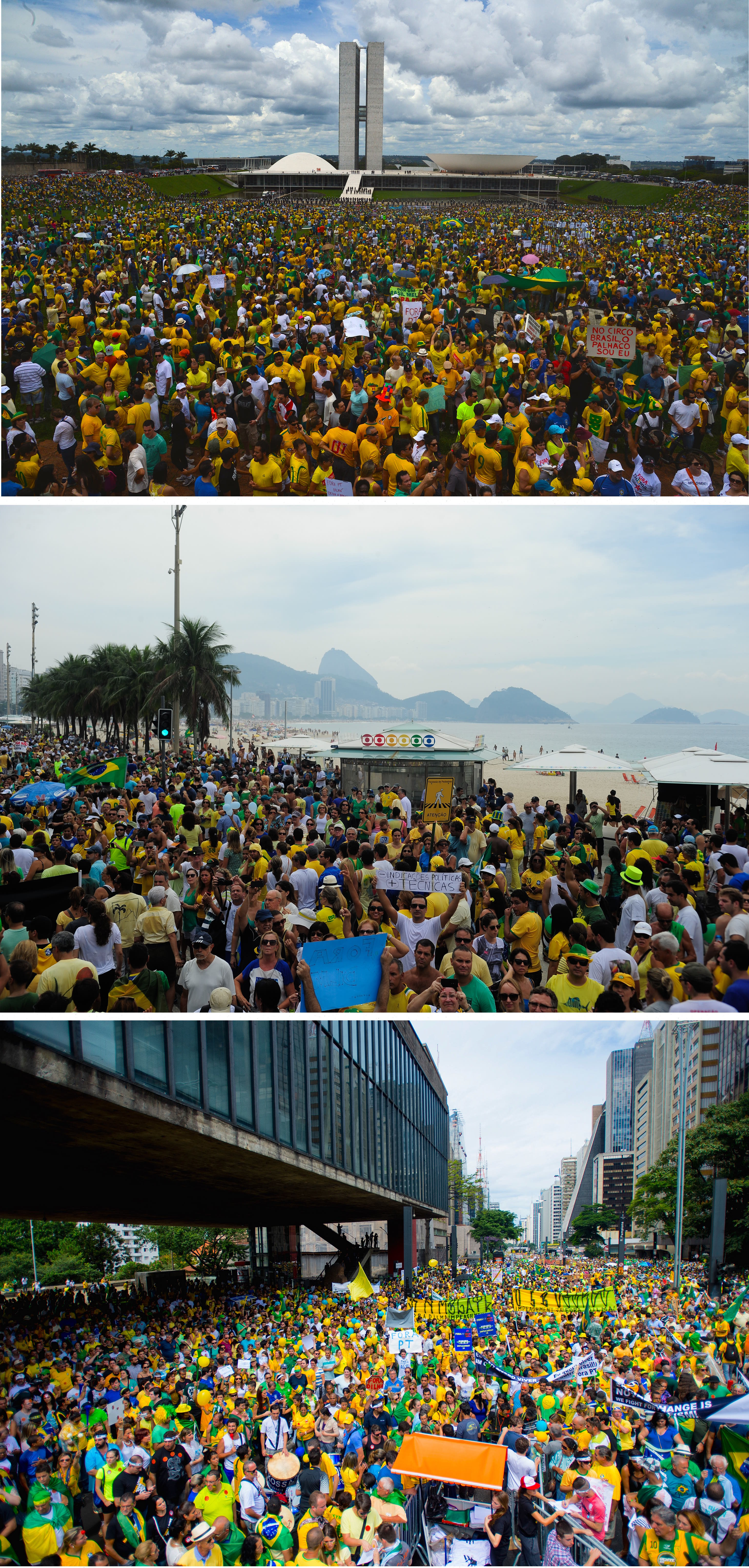
2015–16 protests in Brazil

In 2014, Operation Car Wash, an investigation by the Federal Police of Brazil, uncovered unprecedented money laundering and corruption at the state-controlled oil company Petrobras, where executives allegedly accepted bribes in return for awarding contracts to construction firms at inflated prices. In early 2015, a series of protests against alleged corruption by the government of President Dilma Rousseff began in Brazil, triggered by revelations that numerous politicians were involved in the Petrobras affair. By early 2016, the scandal had escalated into a full-blown political crisis affecting not only President Rousseff, but also former President Luiz Inácio Lula da Silva, resulting in massive demonstrations all over the country involving millions of protesters, both anti and pro-Rousseff. On 17 April 2016, the Chamber of Deputies (the lower house of the Brazilian Parliament) concluded a general vote for the admission of the impeachment process. At that moment, polls showed that 61% of Brazilians believed Rousseff should be impeached, but polls also showed almost the same amount of Brazilians believed Vice President Michel Temer, who was supposed to inherit the presidency following the impeachment process began as Interim President, should be impeached too. In addition, Senator Romero Jucá, appointed as planning minister after Rousseff's dismissal, was caught on tape with former oil executive Sergio Machado agreeing that removing Rousseff is the only way for ending the investigation.

At the same time, Brazil faces its worst economic recession since the 1990s, raising questions about whether the country is adequately prepared for the Games against a volatile political and economic backdrop. According to one OECD spokesperson the Brazilian recession will endure until 2018 and can only be resolved by holding new elections. The IOC, in turn, has stated that it is following the political developments "very closely". On 14 April, the Olympic Security Coordination assured that the economic and political crises would not affect the security and fulfillment of the Games. In his speech during the Olympic torch lighting ceremony in Olympia, IOC President Thomas Bach commented on Brazil's political situation: "This will be the Brazilian Games. Despite the difficulties that the country faces, the event will bring a message of hope to every corner of its territory and also worldwide. The Games will take place in a moment in which the world is shaken by crises. I want to pay tribute to the Brazilian people, who, in a few weeks, will welcome the world with enthusiasm and will leave everyone amazed by its joy and its passion for sports".

On 12 May, President Rousseff was stripped of her powers and duties for 180 days, after an impeachment vote in the Federal Senate, thus Vice President Temer will be acting president during the Games. Rousseff will not be invited to attend any event during the Games. Instead, the main invitation as head of state was sent to Temer as acting president. Temer's legitimacy has been questioned though. Prior to the impeachment vote, the majority of Brazilians supported holding new general elections as a way to solve the political crisis, while only 8% favored Temer's rise to power. As a result of this perception, anti-Temer protests are becoming larger and intenser, and some politicians have claimed the Games will take place amidst political turmoil.

=== Security ===
Since Rio de Janeiro was awarded the 2016 Summer Olympics, the city's crime problems have received more attention. Rio's mayor has admitted that there are "big issues" facing the city in securing the Games from violence. However, he also said that such concerns and issues were presented to the IOC throughout the bidding process. The governor of the state of Rio de Janeiro also highlighted the fact that London faced security problems, with a terrorist attack occurring there on the day after the IOC chose London to host the 2012 Summer Olympics. The estimate was that 5,000 men of the National Public Security Force and 22,000 military officers (14,800 Army; 5,900 Navy and 1,300 of the Brazilian Air Force), in addition to the fixed quota of Rio de Janeiro, will act during the Olympic Games. Many of these officers have been training for possible terrorist attacks, such as on the Metrô. To ensure that no unauthorized persons would be able to enter the Games, additional screening measures were enacted at venues.

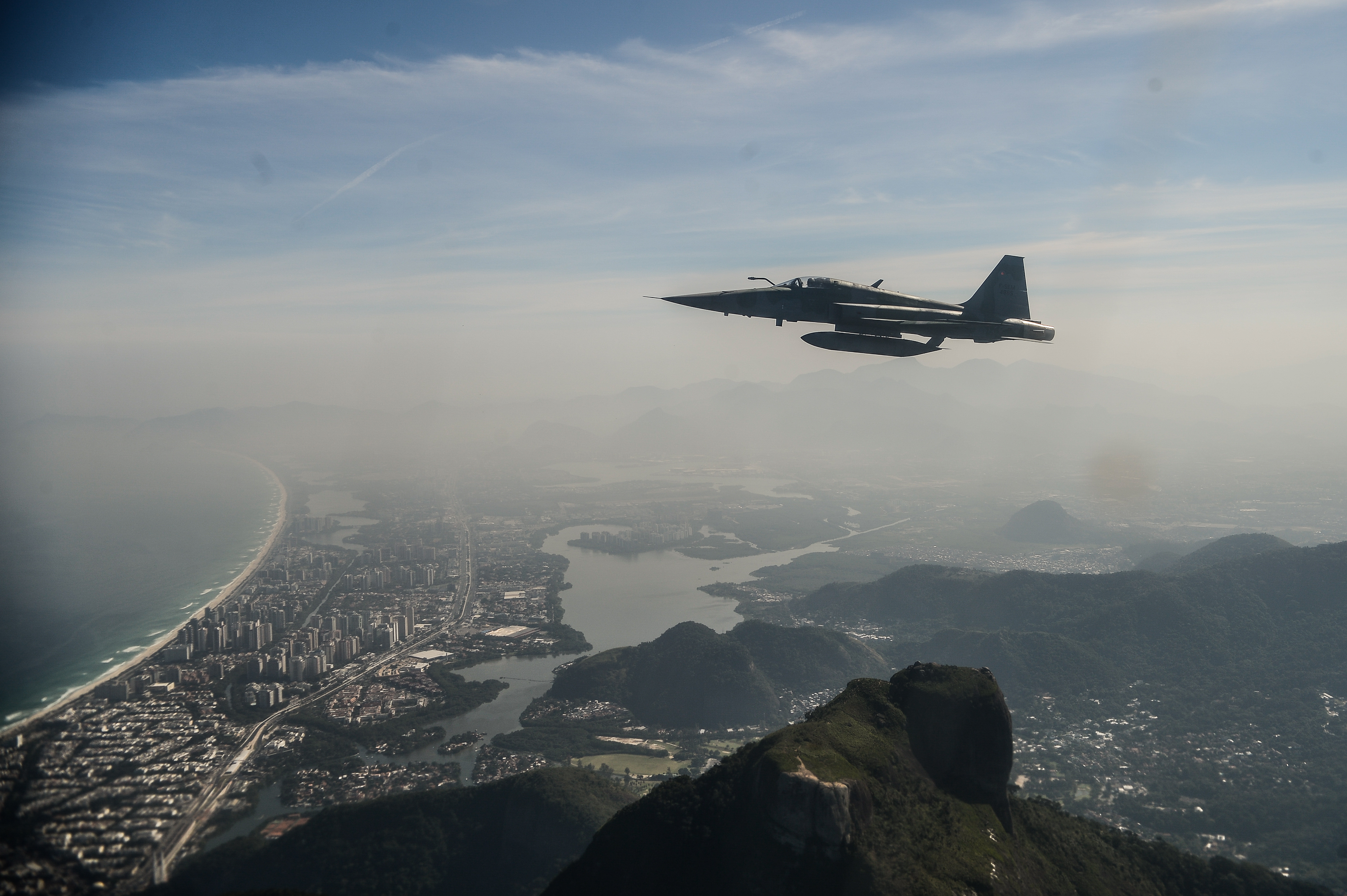
F-5EM Tiger II fighter jet of the Brazilian Air Force during an air intercept training for the 2016 Summer Olympics.

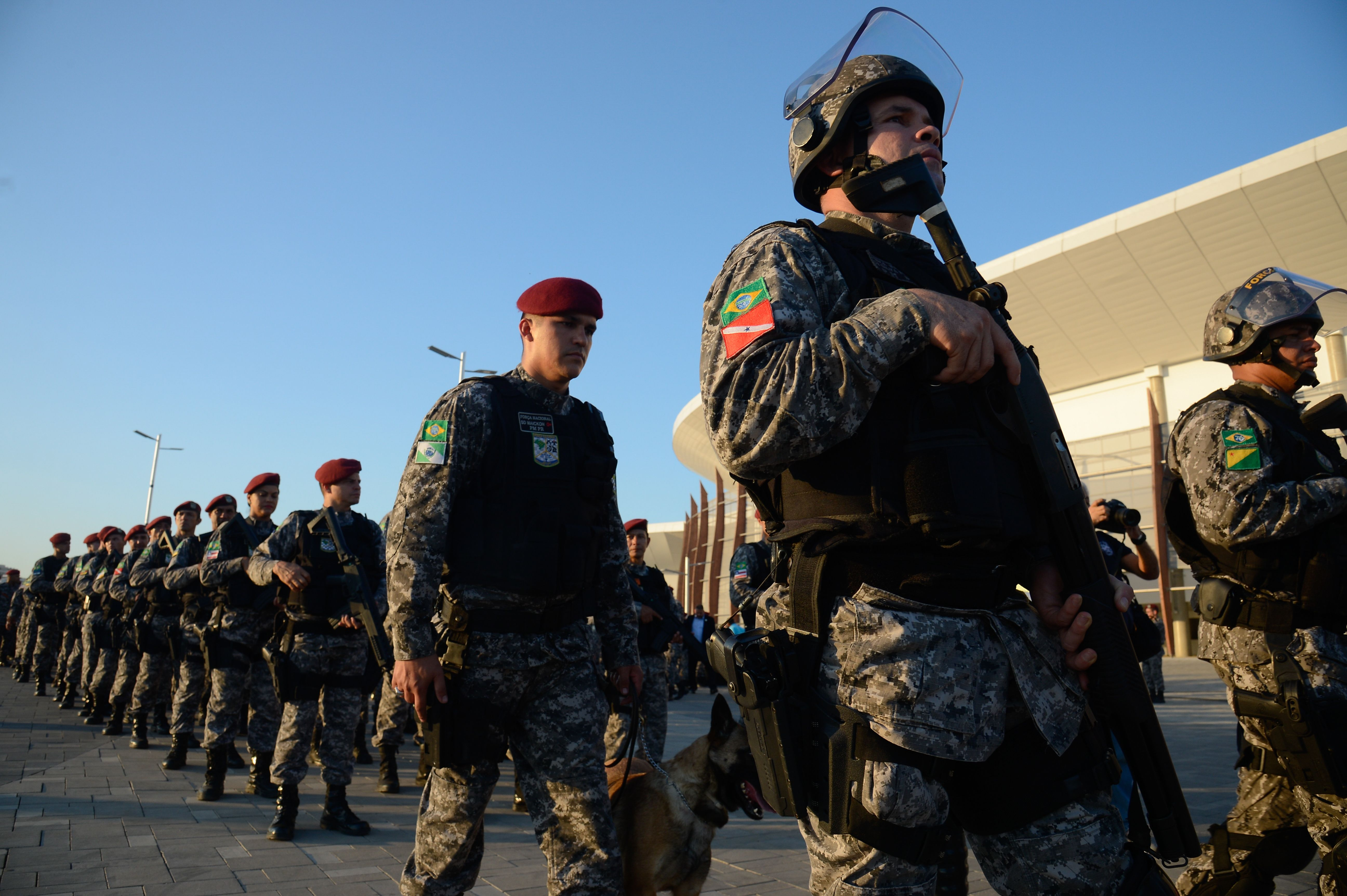
Integrated security operation for the 2016 Summer Olympics

The IOC has expressed optimism regarding the ability of the city and the nation of Brazil to address these concerns, saying that seven years is enough time for Rio de Janeiro to clean up its crime problem. IOC spokesman Mark Adams told The Associated Press, "we have confidence in their capacity to deliver a safe Games in seven years. Security is of course a very important aspect of any Olympic Games no matter where it is in the world. This is of course entirely under the national, regional and city authorities". Luiz Inácio Lula da Silva, former president of Brazil, noted that the city has hosted other high-profile events without major incidents, for example the 2007 Pan American Games.

Community-based Police Pacification Units (UPPs) will be used to build trust in individual communities through the use of street patrols and civic work. Moreover, The Regional Institute of Public Safety reported that the homicide rate of Rio de Janeiro for the first five months of 2012 was at its lowest in the past 21 years, with 10.9 homicides for every 100,000 inhabitants. Despite the decline in homicides and human rights abuses, Human Rights Watch urged Brazil to investigate extrajudicial killings.

=== Crime ===
Despite promises for increased security, there are still security concerns in Rio, with 2,036 killings from January to April 2016. On 21 May 2016, three members representing Spain were robbed at gunpoint in the Santa Teresa neighborhood of Rio de Janeiro, by five youths, two of whom were armed with pistols. In June 2016, one of the bodyguards for the mayor was mugged and killed while off duty; a doctor was killed while on an expressway; and the Australian Paralympic team was robbed at gunpoint. Gang-related shootings on the Red Line expressway, the main road to the Olympic site, were said to be commonplace and had claimed several lives, including that of a 17-year-old girl in May. The girl's murder and other incidents prompted some countries to consider bringing private security forces to the Olympics.

On 30 June 2016, police near the Olympic beach volleyball venue in Copacabana found a foot and other body parts on the shore, possibly from "a woman or young adult" who had been killed. The officers said the parts washed on the sea, triggering possible concerns about the violence in Rio.

On 21 July 2016, the Federal Police of Brazil arrested ten members of an alleged Islamic jihadist terrorist ring accused of planning attacks during the games. The ring was plotting to wreak havoc in a manner similar to the 1972 Munich massacre, with 10 ISIS associates arrested and two more on the run; the two people who had escaped were later arrested. There did not seem to be evidence of a sophisticated terrorist plot.

On 30 July 2016, a fire in the apartments where the Australian Olympic Team prompted an evacuation. The fire was caused by a cigarette, even though Olympic Village is a no-smoking area. Upon return to their rooms, the athletes found that 2 laptops and team shirts had been stolen. It was discovered that the fire alarms were deactivated before the fire with one athlete stating that he slept through the door-knocking and phone calls.

On 4 August 2016, the Australian rowing coaches were robbed at knifepoint close to Ipanema beach. One of the coaches was grabbed around the throat before the attackers fled with credit cards, mobile phones and an Australian team blazer.

On 5 August 2016, the Greek team in the Olympic village reported to officials that many personal items had been stolen from their rooms in the Olympic village including mobile phones, clothes and medical equipment.

On 12 August 2016, an athlete had $20,000 stolen by an Olympic Village employee. The worker was arrested and the money returned.

== Preparations ==
=== Infrastructure concerns ===
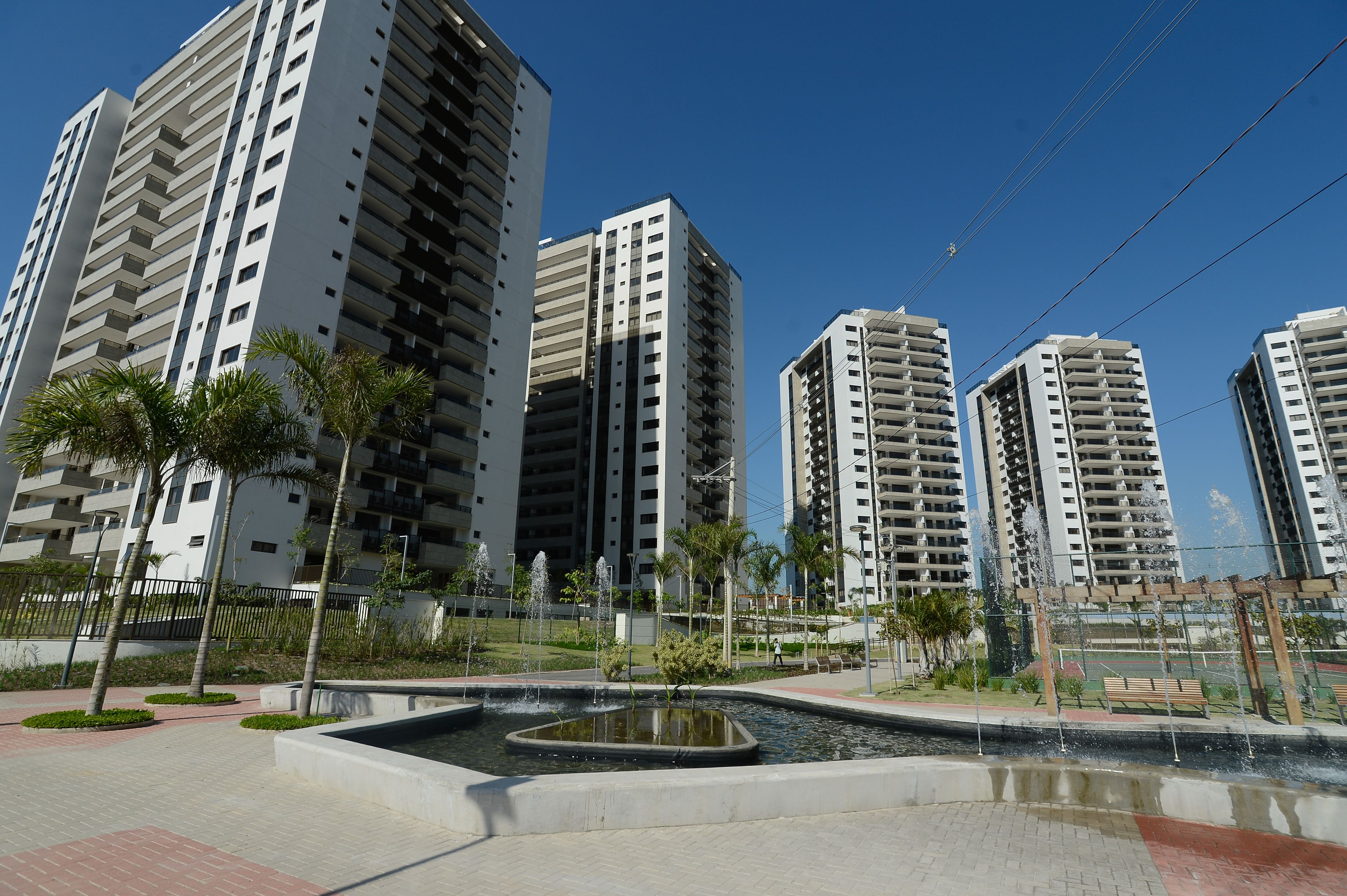
The Rio 2016 Olympic Village

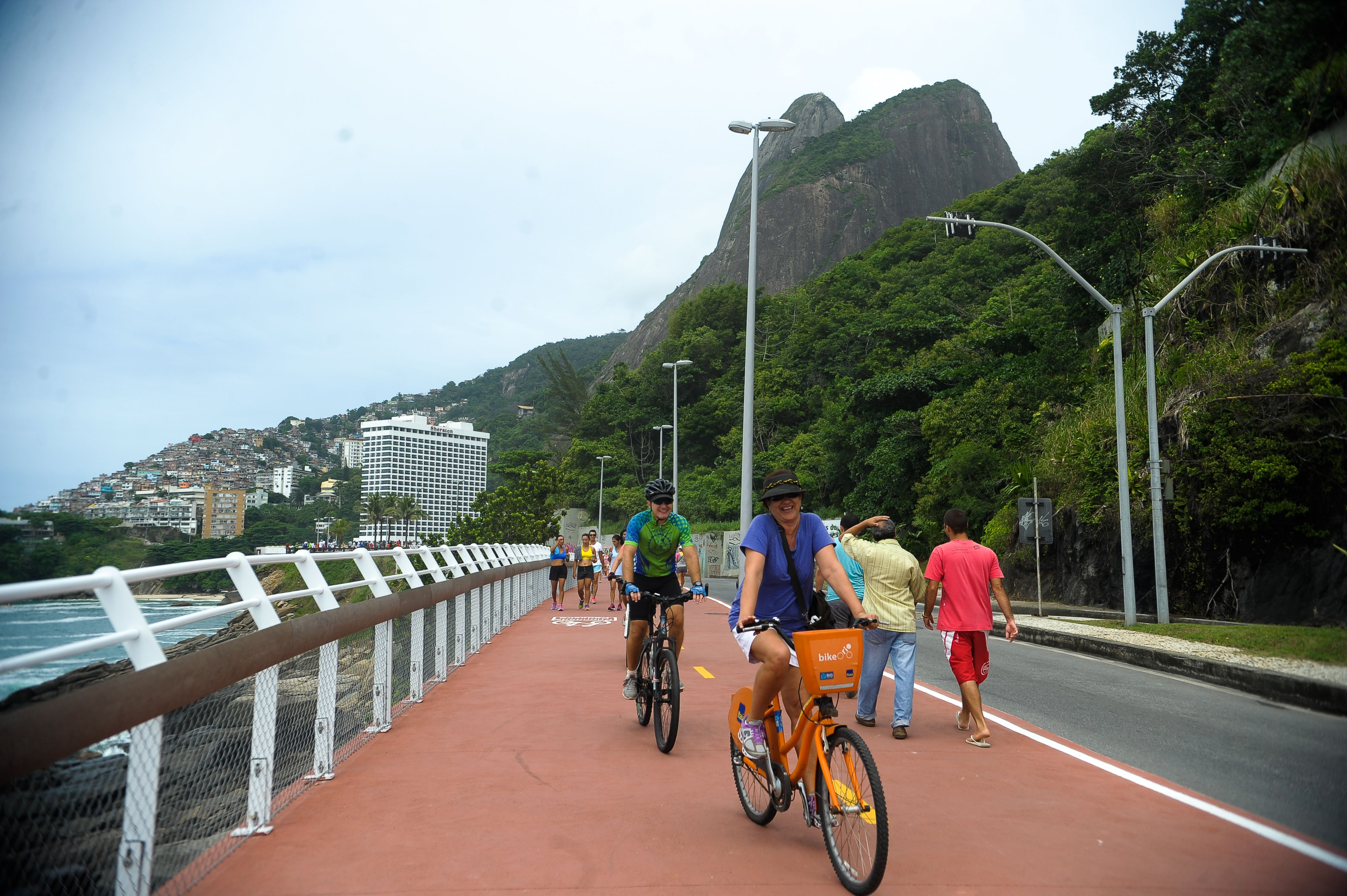
Tim Maia bike path

While the whole city was undergoing major infrastructure improvements, there were concerns that some of the projects would not materialise. On 9 May 2014, the London Evening Standard reported IOC vice-president John Coates calling Brazil's preparations "the worst I’ve experienced" and went on to claim that construction and infrastructure projects were severely behind schedule. "The IOC has formed a special task force to try to speed up preparations but the situation is critical on the ground", the paper quoted him as saying, concluding that such an intervention was "unprecedented". Despite these initial worries, the Rio Olympics Committee reported on 29 December 2015 that most venues were complete except the Rio Olympic Velodrome (76%) and the Youth Arena (75%). Coates' concerns had previously been reported elsewhere in the media.

On 21 April—the day that the Olympic torch was lit—a 50 metres (164 ft) section of the Tim Maia bike path, crossing the Oscar Niemeyer Avenue in São Conrado neighborhood and a part of the legacy of the games, was hit by a giant wave and collapsed. Two pedestrians fell into the ocean to their deaths, and three were injured. Four days after the incident, Rio's mayor Eduardo Paes announced that the bike path would be repaired before the Olympics, and that the companies responsible for the path will be punished.

The Rio 2016 Olympic Village has been described as the largest in Olympic history. Some officials deemed the athletes' village as "unlivable" and unsafe because of major plumbing and electrical hazards still present a fortnight before the opening of the Rio Olympics. Blocked toilets, leaking pipes, exposed wiring, unlit stairwells and dirty floors were among the reported problems at some apartments in the complex. The Australian Olympic team boycotted the village after officials deemed their assigned apartment tower blocks uninhabitable. A team of more than 500 employees of the local Olympic committee worked to fix the problems reported by the delegations. The organizers of the Rio Olympics conceded that there were isolated cases of sabotage by employees during the construction of the Rio 2016 Village.

=== Russian doping scandal and participation restrictions ===
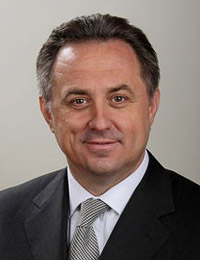
Vitaly Mutko, Russian Minister of Sport

Media attention began growing in December 2014 when German broadcaster ARD reported on state-sponsored doping in Russia, comparing it to doping in East Germany. In November 2015, the World Anti-Doping Agency (WADA) published a report and the International Association of Athletics Federations (IAAF) suspended Russia indefinitely from world track and field events. The United Kingdom Anti-Doping agency later assisted WADA with testing in Russia. In June 2016, they reported that they were unable to fully carry out their work and noted intimidation by armed Federal Security Service (FSB) agents. After a Russian former lab director made allegations about the 2014 Winter Olympics in Sochi, WADA commissioned an independent investigation led by Richard McLaren. McLaren's investigation found corroborating evidence, concluding in a report published in July 2016 that the Ministry of Sport and the FSB had operated a "state-directed failsafe system" using a "disappearing positive [test] methodology" (DPM) from "at least late 2011 to August 2015".

In response to these findings, WADA announced that RUSADA should be regarded as non-compliant with respect to the World Anti-Doping Code and recommended that Russia be banned from competing at the 2016 Summer Olympics. The International Olympic Commission (IOC) rejected the recommendation, stating that the IOC and each sport's international federation would make decisions on each athlete's individual basis. One day prior to the opening ceremony, 278 athletes were cleared to compete under the Russian flag, while 111 were removed because of doping. In contrast, the entire Kuwaiti team was banned from competing under their own flag (for a non-doping related matter).

The IOC's decision on 24 July 2016 was widely criticized by both athletes and writers, as well as members of the Olympic Committee. A member of the IOC Athletes' Commission, Hayley Wickenheiser, wrote, "I ask myself if we were not dealing with Russia would this decision to ban a nation [have] been an easier one? I fear the answer is yes". Writing for Deutsche Welle in Germany, Olivia Gerstenberger said that the head of the IOC, Thomas Bach had "flunked" his first serious test, adding, "With this decision, the credibility of the organization is shattered once more, while that of state-sponsored doping actually receives a minor boost". Bild (Germany) described Bach as "Putin's poodle".

Unlike the IOC, the International Paralympic Committee voted unanimously to ban the entire Russian team from the 2016 Summer Paralympics and suspended the Russian Paralympic Committee, having found evidence that the DPM was also in operation at the 2014 Winter Paralympics.

On 9 December 2016, Canadian lawyer Richard McLaren published the second part of his independent report. The investigation found that from 2011 to 2015, more than 1,000 Russian competitors in various sports (including summer, winter, and Paralympic sports) benefited from the cover-up. Emails indicate that they included five blind powerlifters, who may have been given drugs without their knowledge, and a fifteen-year-old.

=== Aviation incidents ===
On 2 July 2016, two skydivers collided while performing a stunt, practicing for the Olympics where the 28 skydivers would recreate the Olympic rings in the sky during the opening ceremony. The two men's parachutes become tangled-up mid-air after they collided, causing them to fall to their deaths. One man died at the scene and the other died in a hospital. The two deceased men were named as Gustavo Correa Garcez, a national champion, and instructor Guilherme Bastos Padilha. The incident took place over Boituva.

On 26 July 2016, two Brazilian navy aircraft, AF-1 Skyhawks, collided in mid-air near Rio de Janeiro. They were training for the purpose of protecting the Olympics. One of the airplanes' pilots was able to land despite the aircraft being damaged. The other pilot ejected safely before his plane crashed into the sea.

== During the Olympics ==
=== Security ===
On 6 August, a stray bullet was fired at a media tent at the Equestrian Center while about 100 media personnel were present. The bullet pierced the plastic roof of the tent and fell to the ground near a Team Great Britain official and a British photographer. Nobody was hurt during the incident.

On the same day, a "suspicious package" was found near the finish line of the men's cycling road race. As a precaution, security forces performed a controlled explosion on it.

On 9 August, a bus carrying international media was traveling between the Deodoro hockey venue and the main press center at Barra da Tijuca was attacked. Stones thrown at the bus shattered windows. Rio 2016 spokesman Mario Andrada said the attack was "worrying and intolerable".

On 10 August, a stray bullet was found inside the Olympic equestrian centre close to the stable area. The head of Rio 2016 communications, Mario Andrada, said he was in the stables “trying to find out what really happened”.

=== Organization ===
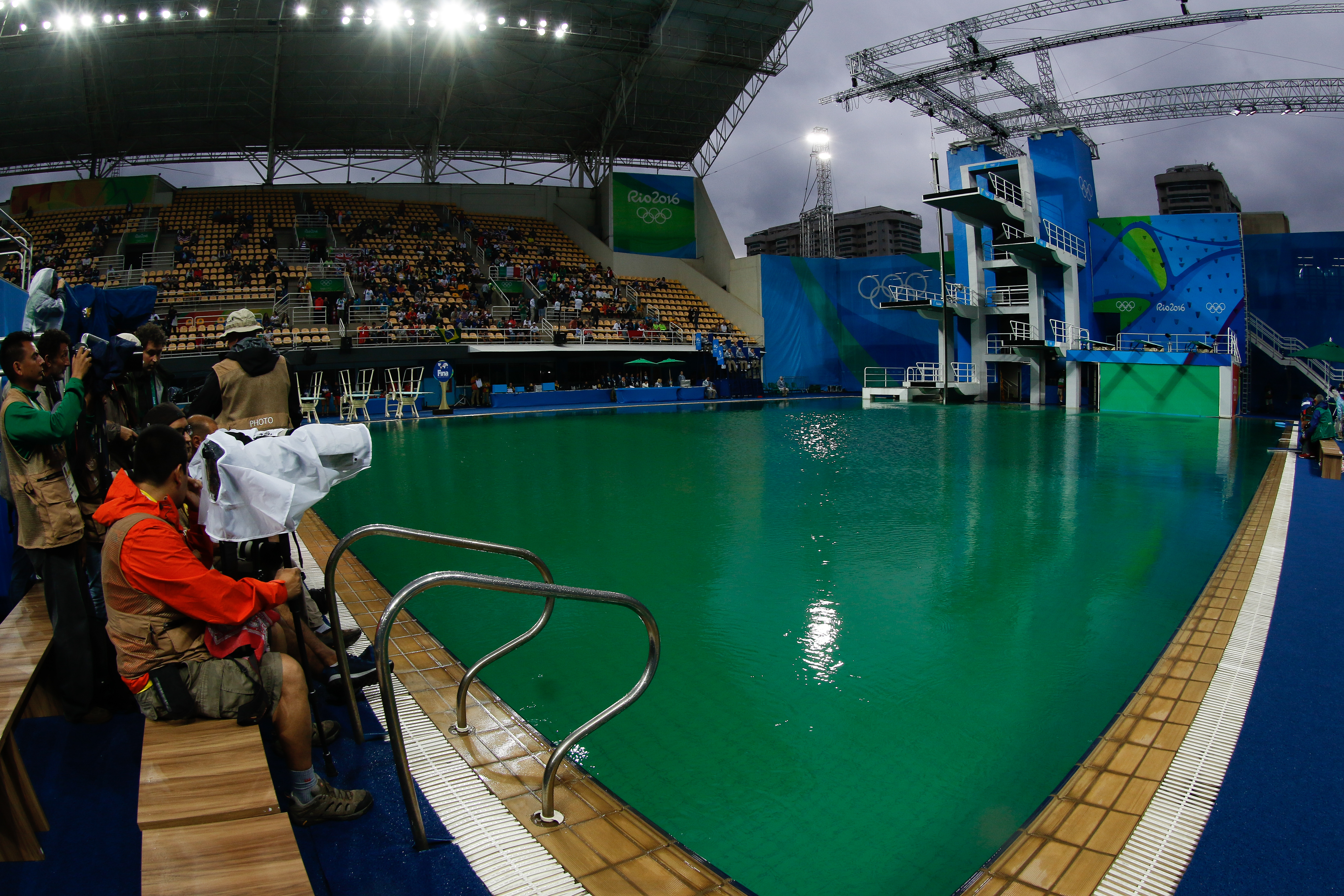
The water at the Maria Lenk Aquatics Center used for the diving competitions turned green on 9 August.

On 4 August, Nigeria played Japan in the men's football group stages. When the national anthem for Nigeria was meant to be played, the Niger national anthem was incorrectly played instead. The Japan national anthem went normally. During the fourth minute of the game, the PA apologized for the mix-up.

Initially, an incorrect version of the Chinese national flag, on which the four smaller stars were pointing upwards (instead of slanted towards the larger star on the flag) was used in all official materials of the Rio 2016 Games, including the flag leading the athletes delegation at the opening ceremony, the flags used in award ceremonies, and the flag on the official Rio 2016 mobile app. However, the mistake remained largely undetected until the first award ceremony featuring the Chinese flag on the second day of the Games, upon which the issue created a huge outcry in China, especially with initial media reports suggesting that the flags had been manufactured in China. Initially, China's State run CCTV America site published an article titled "Rio Olympics: ‘Made in China’ will be everywhere", which stated "All the national flags that will be hoisted during the ceremony are made in China", but was quickly changed after the incident became public.

A spokesperson for the Rio Olympic Committee admitted the mistake and apologized for it, but claimed that all flags had been approved by the respective National Olympic Committees. The Chinese Olympic Committee did not respond to requests for comment, but the Chinese Consulate-General in Rio de Janeiro issued a formal diplomatic complaint and pressed the organizers of the Games to replace the flags with new, correct ones as soon as possible. The Chinese Consulate-General in São Paulo dispatched officials to the flag manufacturer, located on the outskirt of São Paulo, to supervise the express production of new, correct flags. Starting from 11 August (the seventh day of the Games), the correct version of the flag was used.

On 11 August, John Coates, vice president of the IOC, stated that Rio 2016 had been the "most difficult" Games ever and crowd numbers are a "disappointment". Coates said that swathes of empty seats at a number of venues have been a source of frustration for the body.

Starting 9 August, the pool used for diving competitions began turning a green color instead of its natural blue, followed by the water polo pool the next day. Several athletes reported that it affected their performance, either by preventing them from seeing underwater or hurting their eyes (possibly because of increased chlorine to counteract the problem). The color change was officially reported as being caused by a lack of chemicals used for the water treatment process, which resulted in the pH level of the pool to change. The diving pool was closed on 12 August after it began producing a sulfuric smell and was suggested to be a cause of eye itchiness among some athletes who competed within it. A report said that a sanitation contractor had added the dechlorinating sterilizer hydrogen peroxide to water that was already chlorinated, neutralizing the sterilizing effect of chlorine.

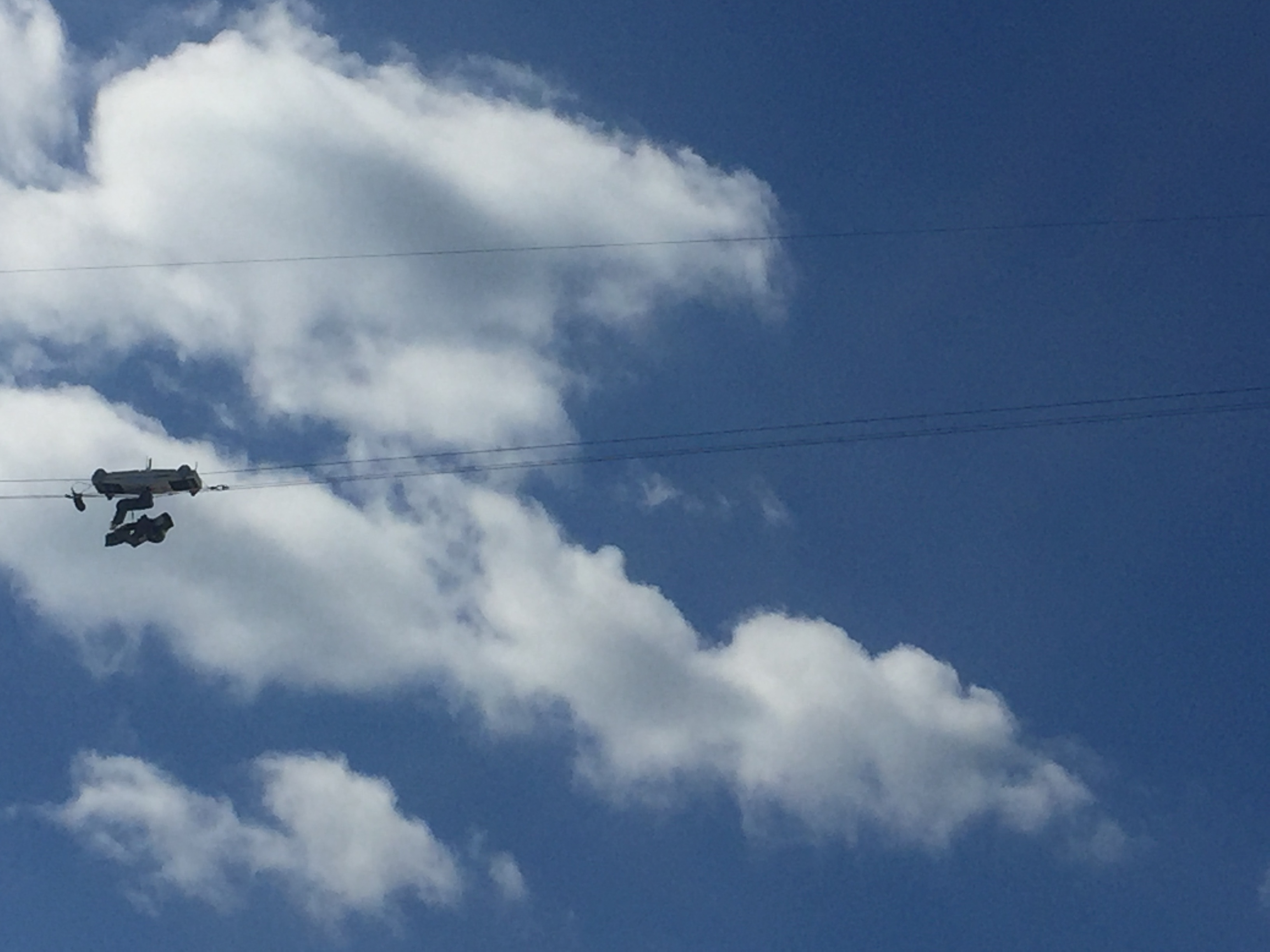
An overhead camera crashed at the Olympic Park on 15 August

On 15 August, seven people, including an 11-year-old girl, were injured after an overhead TV camera crashed to the ground at the Olympic Park.

=== Doping ===
Kenyan athletics coach John Anzrah posed as one of his runners for a drug test. He presented himself as 800-metre runner Ferguson Rotich and even signed the documents for the drug tests. Anzrah was sent home afterwards.

While swimming for the Chinese national team at the 2016 Summer Olympics, Chen Xinyi tested positive for hydrochlorothiazide, a banned substance. Following this, she was suspended from competition in the 2016 Summer Olympics by the Court of Arbitration for Sport.

Kyrgyz athlete Izzat Artykov, bronze medalist in men's 69 kg weightlifting, was suspended from the Games after strychnine was found in his blood sample. He was stripped of the bronze medal.

On 8 December 2016 Russian boxer Misha Aloyan was stripped of the silver medal in 52 kg boxing at the Rio 2016 Summer Olympics after testing positive for tuaminoheptane.

Nijat Rahimov originally won the gold medal in men's 77 kg weightlifting but was disqualified in March 2022 by the Court of Arbitration for Sport for a doping violation (urine substitutions in the weeks before the Games). As of March 2022, medals for this event have not been reallocated, a process that could extend to 2024. If the medal is reallocated, Lü Xiaojun stands to win his third Olympic weightlifting gold medal.

=== Unsportsmanlike crowds ===
Going into the final of Men's floor artistic gymnastics competition held on 14 August, Kenzō Shirai of Japan, the two-time and reigning world champion on floor exercise, was the overwhelming favorite owing to the extremely high difficulty of his routine and excellent execution. But during the final of Men's Floor Shirai had problems with his landings on three of his six passes. In separate interviews after the competition, both Shirai and American Sam Mikulak, who was the top qualifier but finished in last place, expressed disappointment with the crowd, whose booing and jeering had grown increasingly loud during non-Brazilian routines as the competition went on. Eventual competition champion Max Whitlock had avoided this due to his early draw in the final performance.

On 17 August, pole vault silver medallist Renaud Lavillenie was booed by the Rio crowd for a second time in 24 hours. Olympics chief Thomas Bach called the conduct of the crowd "shocking" and "unacceptable at the Olympics". IAAF chief Lord Coe consoled Lavillenie after the incident.

=== Boxing judging ===
Controversy surrounded the new judging system in boxing; the previous system of computerized scoring was replaced with a 10-point system similar to professional boxing, with five judges scoring each boxer based on factors such as quality of punches landed, effective aggressiveness, and ring generalship and defense. After each round, scores from a random selection of three of the judges were counted; the winner of the round was awarded 10 points, and the opponent received a lower score based on their performance.

Two results in particular attracted controversy (both involving Russian athletes whose victories were put in question): the defeat of Vasily Levit by Russian Evgeny Tishchenko in the men's heavyweight gold-medal fight, drawing jeers from the audience, and the defeat of Michael Conlan by Russian Vladimir Nikitin in the men's bantamweight quarter-final, after which Conlan accused AIBA and the Russian team of cheating, even tweeting to Russian President Vladimir Putin "Hey Vlad, How much did they charge you bro??" The AIBA would remove an unspecified number of judges and referees following the controversy, stating that they "determined that less than a handful of the decisions were not at the level expected" and "that the concerned referees and judges will no longer officiate at the Rio 2016 Olympic Games"; however, the original decision would still remain.

On 30 September 2021, 5 years after the conclusion of the games, an independent report by professor Richard McLaren confirmed that there was a system in place at the games that manipulated the results of boxing matches. The report stated that there were at least 11 fights at the Rio games that were suspicious, including the controversial defeats of Conlan and Levit as well as the gold medal match between France's Tony Yoka and Great Britain's Joe Joyce. It was reported that there was possible favouritism towards the French team during the tournament as the executive director of the AIBA, Karim Bouzidi, was French. Other fights were reportedly manipulated to allow Yoka an easier route to the final whilst there was a bribery attempt in a fight involving France's Sofiane Oumiha. The report also stated that there were 11 other fights that would have had different outcomes if the controversial new scoring system was not put in place.

=== Swimming pool data ===
Researchers at two American universities questioned whether a current in the pool may have affected swimming times, giving some an unfair advantage in the Rio Olympics, particularly in the single-length 50m events. Data from the Games seems to suggest that swimmers in one half of the pool had an unfair advantage over those in the other, and that this has been a persistent problem in the sport.

Research at the Indiana University's Counsilman Center for the Science of Swimming, and at Eastern Michigan University, suggested that swimmers in the higher-numbered lanes had a performance boost in the 50m, which has competitors swim one pool length. There was a reverse effect for swimming the opposite direction. On a longer race which involves swimming more than one length of the pool, swimmers in the lower-numbered lanes had a boost on the return.

In results from the men's and women's 50m heats for every type of stroke in Rio, the researchers found that almost all those who qualified for the final swam in lanes four to eight. Athletes who then moved to the lower-numbered lanes showed a decrease in performance. Only one medallist in the 50m swim came from the lower lanes – US swimmer Anthony Ervin.

=== Lochtegate ===
Lochtegate is a name of a scandal involving United States swim team members Ryan Lochte, Jimmy Feigen, Gunnar Bentz, and Jack Conger during the 2016 Summer Olympics held in Rio de Janeiro, Brazil. While initial news stories reported that Lochte and three other US swimmers had been robbed at gunpoint after a night out in Rio, later details emerged that the "armed robbers posing as police" were actually security guards at a gas station where the swimmers had urinated outside the bathroom and Lochte allegedly vandalized a framed poster, and ended with the swimmers providing money to the guards. Some of the swimmers were detained in Brazil as witnesses. Ultimately, the athletes each released statements, and one swimmer paid a fine of approximately $10,800 to a Brazilian charity in order to get his passport back. Lochte apologized for not being more candid about the gas station dispute, and subsequently lost four major sponsorships.

On September 8, both the U.S. Olympic Committee and USA Swimming suspended Lochte for 10 months and Bentz, Conger, and Feigen for four months. Additionally, Lochte was required to complete 20 hours of community service, and Bentz was required to complete 10 hours. All were made ineligible for financial support during their suspensions, removed from the U.S. Olympic delegation to the White House, barred from U.S. Olympic training centers, and blocked from attending USA Swimming's year-end Golden Goggles celebration.

Lochte was charged in Brazil with falsely reporting a crime. The scandal gained significant media attention both during the games and after their conclusion. In July 2017, the court in Brazil dismissed the charges against Lochte, saying his actions "did not rise to the level of filing a false crime report."

=== Daily Beast story ===
On August 11, 2016, The Daily Beast published an article entitled "I Got Three Grindr Dates in an Hour in the Olympic Village", written by Nico Hines, the site's London editor, who was assigned to cover the Olympic Games. Hines, a heterosexual married man, signed up for several gay and straight online dating apps, including Tinder, Bumble and Grindr, and documented his experiences in the Olympic Village. While not specifically naming names, Hines provided enough detail in the article to identify individual athletes, leading to widespread criticism that this information could be used against closeted gay athletes, especially those living in repressive countries. Facing intense backlash online, The Daily Beast edited the piece to remove details that could allow athletes to be identified, and editor in chief John Avlon added a lengthy editor's note. Criticism challenging the value of the piece continued, and The Daily Beast eventually removed the article altogether and issued an apology. In March 2017, Hines issued a formal apology for his actions, and it was announced by the website's editor Hines would be returning to The Daily Beast "following a lengthy period of intense reflection".

Andrew M. Seaman, ethics committee chair for the Society of Professional Journalists, called the article "journalistic trash, unethical and dangerous". The National Lesbian and Gay Journalists Association stated "The reporting was unethical, extremely careless of individual privacy and potentially dangerous to the athletes". Vince Gonzales, professor of professional practice at USC Annenberg School for Communication and Journalism wrote "I think this borders on journalistic malpractice". The president of GLAAD, Sarah Kate Ellis, wrote "How this reporter thought it was OK—or that somehow it was in the public's interest—to write about his deceitful encounters with these men reflects a complete lack of judgment and disregard for basic decency, not to mention the ethics of journalism". Swimmer Amini Fonua, who represented Tonga at the Rio games, criticized the article as 'deplorable', writing: "It is still illegal to be gay in Tonga, and while I’m strong enough to be me in front of the world, not everybody else is. Respect that."

== Anti-Israel incidents ==
Prior to the Olympics, Facebook allowed users to add the Olympic logo and the team flag to their profile pictures; however, Israel was not included on this list. The Israeli flag was later added to the list; however, it was not listed alphabetically, but rather was included at the end of the list.

The Lebanese delegation was assigned to ride from the Olympic village to the opening ceremony on the same bus as the Israeli delegation. The head of the Lebanese team, Salim al-Haj Nicolas, admitted that he demanded that the bus door be closed on the Israeli team, and that the Lebanese demanded that the Israeli athletes not board the bus. Udi Gal, an Israeli Olympic sailor, said his team ultimately decided to travel separately to avoid an "international and physical incident", but added "How could they let this happen on the eve of the Olympic Games? Isn't this the opposite of what the Olympics represents?"

A Saudi Arabian judoka, Joud Fahmy, was accused of forfeiting her match in order to avoid competing against Israeli Gili Cohen. Fahmy, Saudi Arabia's news agency Al Arabiya, and the Saudi Olympic delegation said that Fahmy forfeited because she received an injury. Jim Nieto, the martial arts instructor who coached her before the Olympics, said it seemed fishy that she, after taking part in the Opening Ceremony, was reportedly injured so close to her fight date, because top competitors generally do not fight the day before their competition. He said "I feel sorry for her. Let her fight — even if she lasts 10 seconds. She busted her butt for almost a year to get there".

Egyptian judoka Islam El Shehaby refused to shake hands with Israeli Or Sasson, or to perform the traditional post-match bow (giving only a quick nod), after Sasson defeated El Shehaby in a first-round match in the heaviest weight class on 12 August. American coach Jimmy Pedro called the Egyptian's behavior "completely dishonorable and totally unsportsmanlike". El Shehaby was sent home early by the IOC and Egypt's Olympic committee for refusing to bow to his opponent and the mat.

== Ticket scandal ==
On 5 August, the day of the 2016 Summer Olympics opening ceremony, police in Rio de Janeiro arrested two people for attempted illegal resale of hundreds of tickets allocated to the Olympic Council of Ireland (OCI). One of the two was employed by THG Sports, which was the OCI's authorised ticket reseller (ATR) in 2012 but not 2016; the OCI denied any involvement. Shane Ross, the Irish Minister of State, promised a "robust inquiry". Pro 10 Sports Management, the OCI's 2016 ATR, said the man arrested was working as their agent to distribute tickets which had been paid for legitimately. On 17 August, Pat Hickey, the OCI president, was arrested in Rio in connection with the investigation.

== Policies on social media ==
In October 2015, the IOC has new rules on social media it stated that "The use of Olympic Material transformed into graphic animated formats such as animated GIFs (i.e. GIFV), GFY, WebM, or short video formats such as Vines and others, is expressly prohibited." and also stated that "Broadcasting images via live-streaming applications (e.g. Periscope, Meerkat) is prohibited inside Olympic venues."

== Abandoned venues ==
After the 2016 Summer Olympics and the 2016 Summer Paralympics, many of its Olympic venues remained abandoned and unused just 6 months after the events. Many of its photos depict of venues being run-down as a result of neglect from officials, including the Maracanã Stadium where it was largely abandoned (which has since been repaired as of 2024).

== Animal abuse ==
During the relaying of the torch in Manaus, "Juma", a female jaguar, was used as a mascot. She escaped her handlers after the ceremony and four tranquiliser darts failed to stop her approaching a soldier. She was killed with a single pistol shot. The death provoked outrage similar to that of Harambe the gorilla killed earlier in 2016.

== See also ==
- Concerns and controversies over the 2010 Commonwealth Games
- Controversies at the 2012 Summer Paralympics
- List of athletes at the 2016 Summer Olympics with a prior doping offence
- Olympic Games scandals and controversies
