= Robert Jacques =

Robert Jacques may refer to:

- Robert Jacques (footballer, born 1947), French football player and manager
- Robert Jacques (footballer, born 1957), French football player and manager
- Robert Jacques, with Nicolas Abel François Frionnet composer of the first national anthem of Niger (1962-2023)
