= Flag of Niger =

Republic of Niger
- Use: National flag
- Proportion: 6:7 (by convention; see below.)
- Adopted: 23 November 1959; 66 years ago
- Design: A horizontal tricolour of orange, white, and green; charged with an orange circle in the centre.

The flag of Niger (Hausa: tutar Nijar) has been the national flag since 1959, a year prior to its formal independence from French West Africa. It uses the national colors of orange, white and green, in equal horizontal bands, with an orange circle in the center. It forms one of the official national symbols of the Republic of Niger, along with the coat of arms, the national anthem ("The Honor of the Fatherland"), and the national motto: "Fraternité, Travail, Progrès".

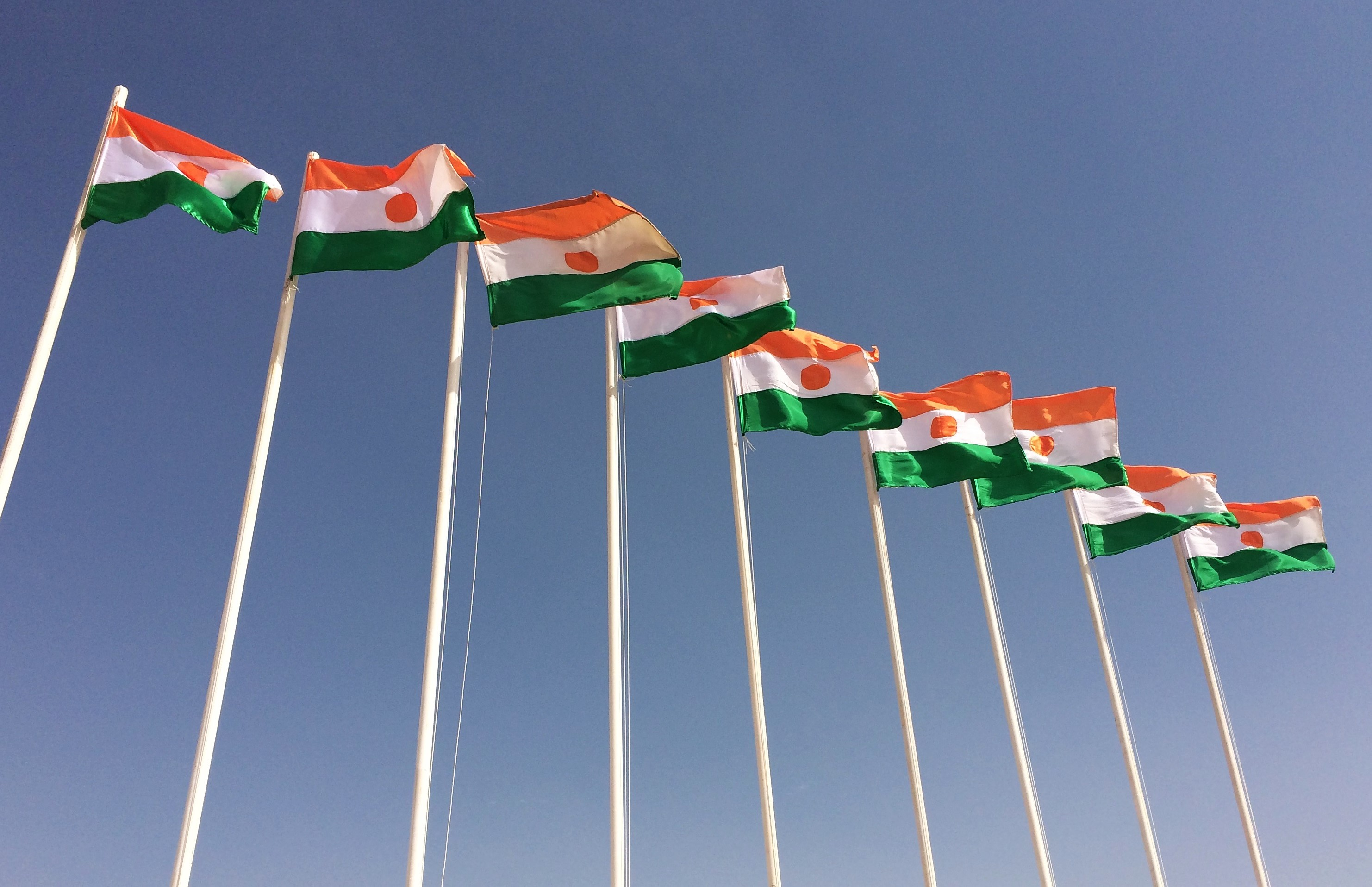
Flags of Niger

== Legal definition ==
Prior to the independence from French West Africa, the flag of Niamey was adopted by the Territorial Assembly of the Niamey Colony on 23 November 1959, shortly before the proclamation of the Republic within the French Community on 18 December 1959. The flag was designed in 1958. It was retained upon independence in 1960 and has remained unchanged through to the 2010 Constitution.

== Symbolism ==
A number of sources have described the symbolic intent of the flag, although official sources have yet to confirm. Common interpretations are that the upper orange band represents the northern regions of the Sahara Desert or the Saharian zone, the center white band represents the Sahelian zone, and the lower green band represents the fertile regions of southern Niger or the Sudanian zone, the orange disc in the center band is thought to stand for the sun.

== Ratio ==
The flag's traditional portrayal with an unusual 6:7 ratio is of unknown significance and is not used consistently in print applications of the Nigerien government. The ratio is not explicitly specified in the Constitution of Niger.

Other ratios seen

Ratio 2:3

Ratio 3:5

Ratio 1:2

== Historical national flags ==
Flag	Years of use	Ratio	Government	Description
	1902–1904	2:3	As part of Senegambia and Niger	The French tricolor was used as the official flag of Niger for most of its history as a French colony.
	1904–1922	2:3	As part of Upper Senegal and Niger	The French tricolor was used as the official flag of Niger for most of its history as a French colony.
	1922–1959	2:3	Colony of Niger	The French tricolor was used as the official flag of Niger for most of its history as a French colony.
	1959–present	6:7	Colony of Niger	The current flag, consisting of a horizontal triband of orange, white and green; charged with an orange circle in the center, was adopted as the official flag of the Colony of Niger on 23 November 1959. It has remained the national flag of the Republic of Niger since its independence in 1960.
	1959–present	6:7	Republic of Niger	The current flag, consisting of a horizontal triband of orange, white and green; charged with an orange circle in the center, was adopted as the official flag of the Colony of Niger on 23 November 1959. It has remained the national flag of the Republic of Niger since its independence in 1960.

== Other flags ==
=== Military flags ===
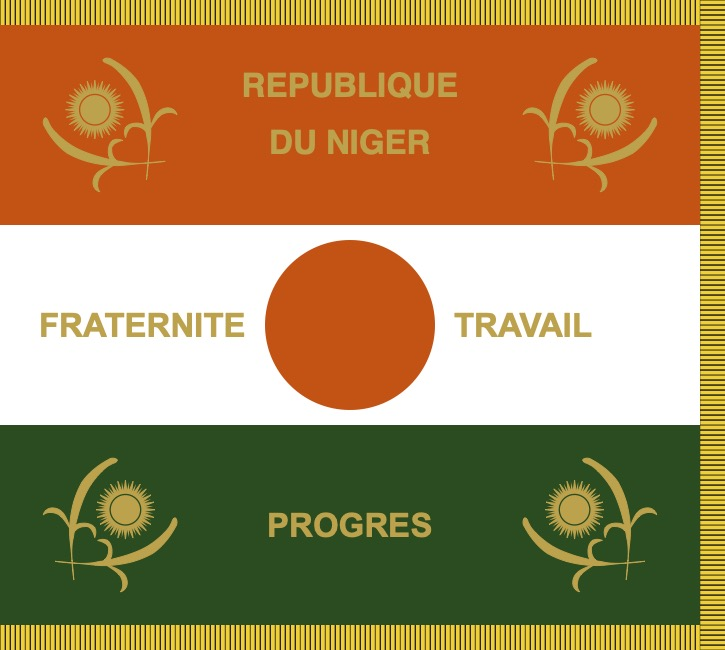
Flag of the Niger Armed Forces, obverse side

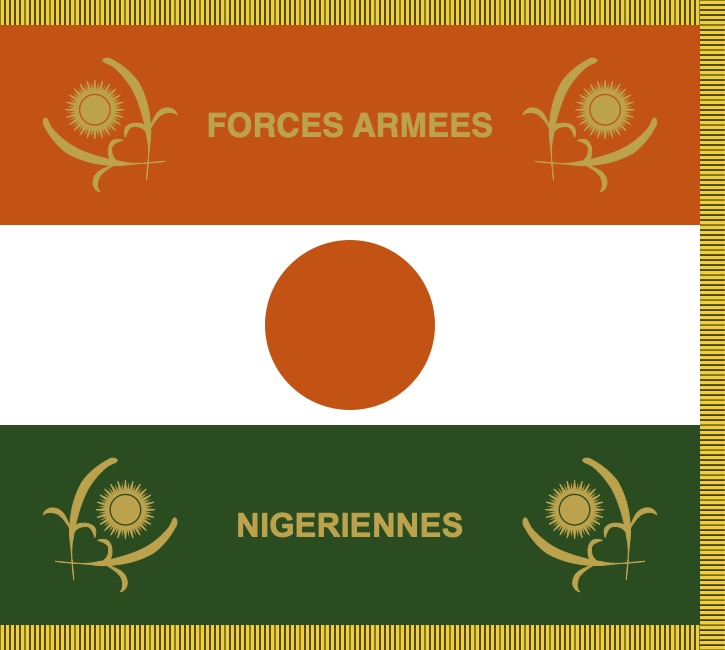
Flag of the Niger Armed Forces, reverse side

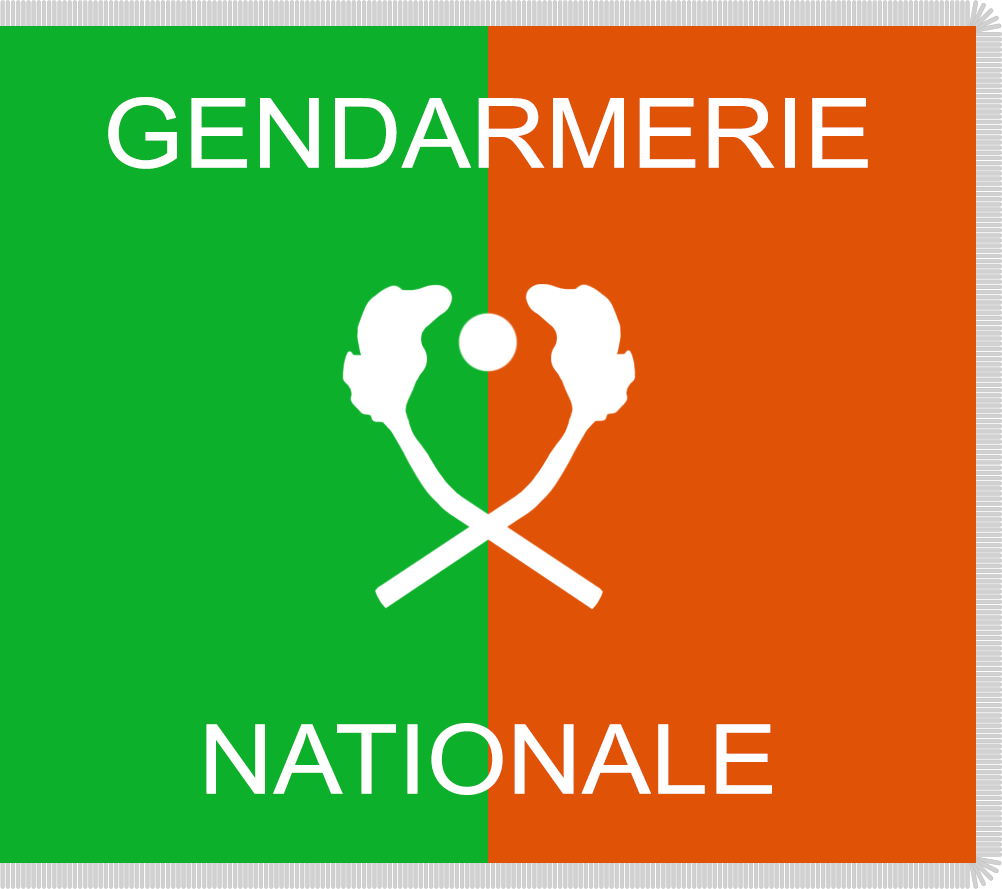
Flag of the Gendarmerie Nationale

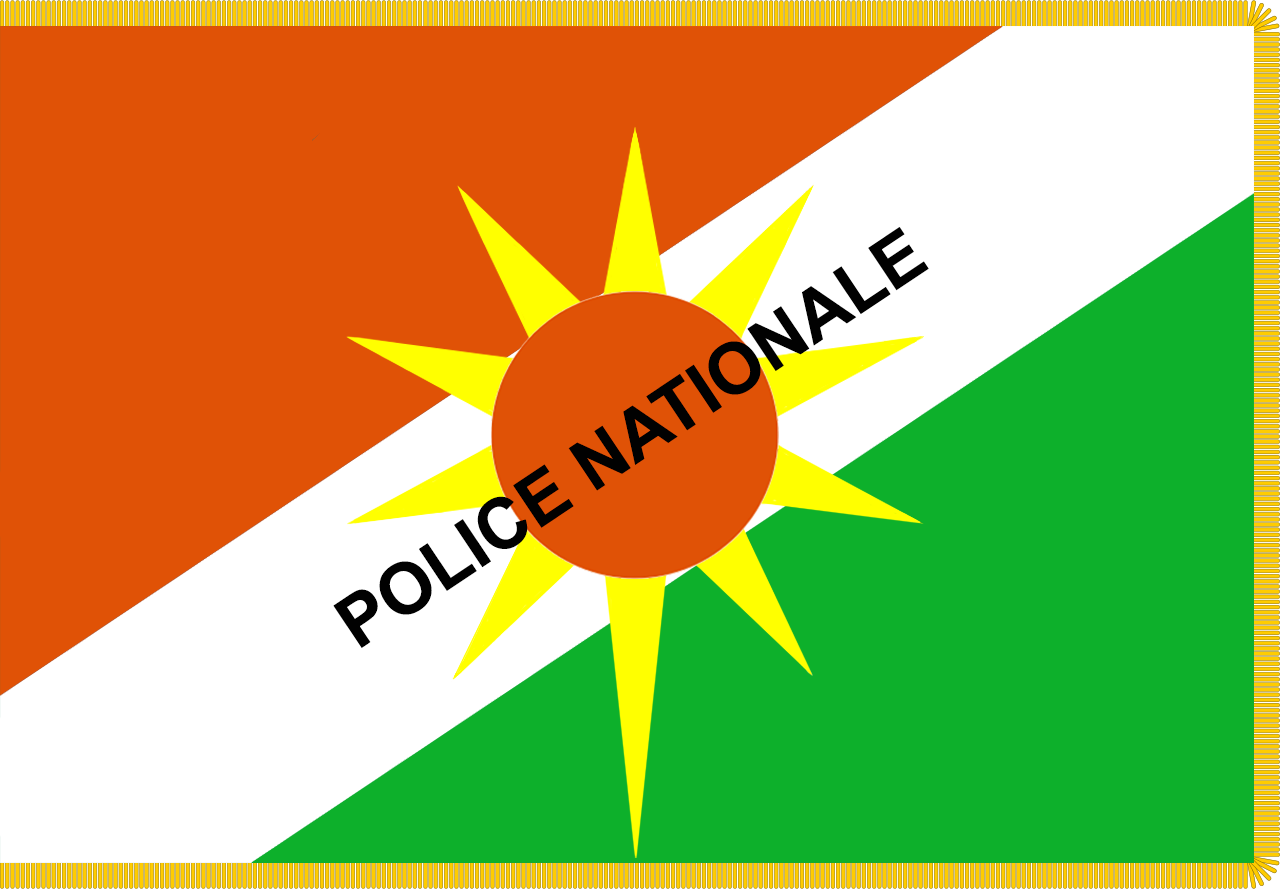
Flag of the National Police

Roundel of the Niger Air Force

Historical roundel of the Niger Air Force (1961–1980)

=== Ethnic group flags ===
Flag of the Hausa people (53.1% of the total population of Niger (Note: See: Demographics of Niger § Ethnic groups))

Flag of the Kanuri people (5.9% of the total population of Niger)

Flag of the Toubou people (0.4% of the total population of Niger)

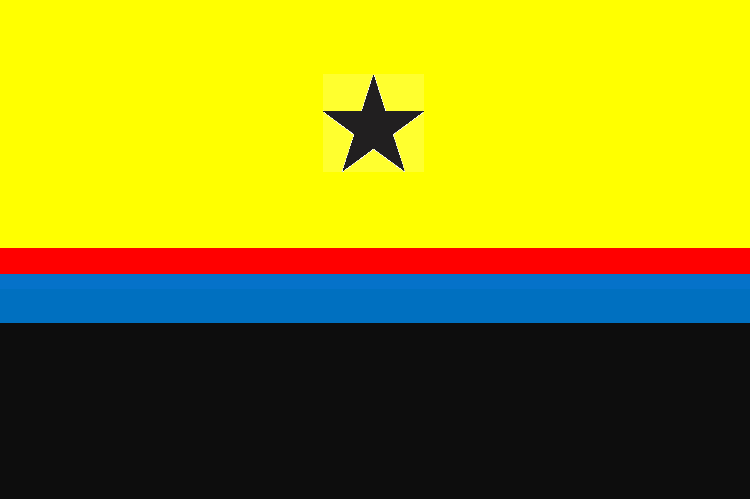
Flag of Daza-speaking Toubou people

== See also ==
- List of Nigerien flags
- Coat of arms of Niger
- Flag of India, also horizontal orange-white-green tricolor, but with a blue Ashoka Chakra rather than an orange circle.
- Flag of Hungary, simple red-white-green tricolor rather than an orange-white-green one
