= List of Nigerien flags =

This is a list of flags used in Niger.

== National flag ==
Flag	Date	Use	Description
	1959–present	Flag of Niger	A horizontal triband of orange, white, and green, charged with an orange circle in the centre.

== Ethnic flags ==
Flag	Date	Use	Description
	?–present	Flag of the Hausa people	A white field with a Dagin Arewa in the center. Used unofficially to represent the Hausa people. (Note: See: Demographics of Niger § Ethnic groups)
	?–present	Flag of the Kanuri people	A horizontal triband of blue, yellow, and green, with a yellow star in the green band.
	?–present	Flag of the Toubou people	A horizontal bicolor of yellow and blue, with a black star in the center.
	?–present	Flag of the Daza people	A horizontal bicolour of yellow and black, divided with two lines of red and blue and a black star in the center of the yellow stripe.

== Political flags ==
Flag	Date	Use	Description
	2015–present	Flag of the Patriotic Movement for the Republic	A vertical bicolor of orange and white with an orange sun in the white band.

== Military flags ==
Flag	Date	Use	Description
	1961–present	Flag of the Niger Armed Forces (obverse)	A horizontal triband of orange, white, and green; charged with an orange circle in the centre, four suns with wheat in the corners, a golden fringe, the name of the country, and the motto "Fraternite, Travail, Progres".
	1961–present	Flag of the Niger Armed Forces (reverse)	A horizontal triband of orange, white, and green; charged with an orange circle in the centre, four suns with wheat in the corners, a golden fringe (shown here on the wrong side), and the name of the armed forces.
	1962–present	Flag of the Gendarmerie Nationale	A vertical bicolor of green and orange with a white fringe, a white sun with wheat, and the name of the National Gendarmerie.
	1999–present	Flag of the National Police	A diagonal triband of orange, white, and green with an orange sun with yellow rays in the center, a golden fringe, and the name of the National Police.

== Historical flags ==
=== Kanem–Bornu Empire ===
Flag	Date	Use	Description
	700–1380	Flag of the Kanem Empire	A white field with a green palm tree in the center.
	1380–1890	Flag of the Bornu Empire	A brown field with a white crescent moon in the center.

=== French rule ===
Flag	Date	Use	Description
	1890–1940; 1944–1959	Flag of France	A vertical tricolour of blue, white, and red (proportions 3:2).
	1940–1942	Flag of Vichy France	A vertical tricolour of blue, white, and red with an axe and seven golden stars.
	1943–1944	Flag of Free France	A vertical tricolour of blue, white, and red with a red Cross of Lorraine.

== See also ==
- Flag of Niger
- Coat of arms of Niger
