= Constitution of Niger =

The Republic of Niger has had seven constitutions, two substantial constitutional revisions, and two periods of rule by decree since its independence from French colonial rule in 1960. The "Seventh Republic" operated under the Constitution of 2010 until its dissolution in 2023 by General Omar Tiani in a coup d'état. The junta declared a five-year transitional charter in 2025.

== Constitution of 25 February 1959 ==
The Constituent Assembly of Niger, a body created from the Territorial Assembly of Niger elected in December 1958, ratified the Constitution of 1959 by a vote of 44 to 8. The Constitution provided a parliamentary system with limited internal self-government within the French Community. The former Governor of Niger, Don-Jean Colombani, remained the head of state, now titled High Commissioner of Niger. Powers including defense, foreign affairs, and currency were retained by France. On 12 March 1959 the Constituent Assembly became the Legislative Assembly of Niger, with the head of government, Hamani Diori, retaining the title of President of the Council. Executive powers were vested in the Assembly. The new Assembly was to have 60 deputies elected for 5-year terms. The constitution established elements, such as the Flag of Niger, the National anthem of Niger and the Coat of Arms of Niger, along with language on the naming of political bodies, rights and powers which have been retained in subsequent texts.

== Constitution of 8 November 1960 (First Republic) ==
The Constitution of 8 November 1960 marks the first fully independent constitutional system of the Republic of Niger: the Nigerien First Republic. With a constitutional revision in 1965, the system remained in place until the 1974 Nigerien coup d'état.

This constitution was revised on 7 September 1965.

== 1974 Military Rule ==
Following the 1974 Nigerien coup d'état, a military council governed the nation without recourse to a Constitution until 1989, or a defined civilian element until 1982. The leader of the 1974 coup, General Seyni Kountché ruled as head of state and President of the Supreme Military Council (CSM), an advisory body which after 1982, contained elements of a Council of Ministers, with an appointed Prime Minister, holding limited powers. A consultative National Council for Development (CND) replaced the National Assembly. Political parties were illegal. Following the General's death on 10 November 1987, General Ali Saïbou became President of the CSM and began a series of reforms which led to the Second Republic.

== Constitution of September 1989 (Second Republic) ==
The Constitution of September 1989 established a single political party and a consultative assembly in place of a National Assembly.

== Constitution of December 1992 (Third Republic) ==
The constitution of December 1992 was created over more than a year, following the formation of the civilian National Conference to supersede semi-Military rule. Ratified on 26 December 1992, approved by referendum and enacted 22 January 1993, the Constitution created a dual executive system. The President, as Head of State, was popularly elected to a five-year term, limited to two terms, and named the Prime Minister. The Prime Minister, as Head of Government, was chosen by an 83-person National Assembly, elected by proportional representation. Consequently, by 1994 Niger faced a President who was a political rival of his own Prime Minister. The National Conference also inserted strong constitutional provisions guarding Human Rights, a commission meant to guard freedom of the press, and explicitly tasked the Supreme Court with protecting these rights.

== Constitution of May 1996 (Fourth Republic) ==
The constitution of December 1992 was suspended by a military coup led by Ibrahim Baré Maïnassara in January 1996. The Constitution of 12 May 1996 was approved by referendum as the Fourth Republic. Following an election disputed nationally and internationally, Maïnassara declared himself winner in the first round of presidential elections. The 1996 constitution was marked by a very strong executive and the ability to rule by decree. When less than three years later Maïnassara was himself killed in the coup of 9 April 1999, the military reappointed Ibrahim Hassane Mayaki as prime minister for a transition government and a transitional cabinet consisting of 20 members, most of whom were civilian to create a new constitution. Coup leader and head of the National Reconciliation Council (CRN) Major Daouda Malam Wanké quickly announced its intention to promulgate a new constitution and institute a return to civilian rule. The interim government also replaced 7 of Niger's regional military leaders. Wanké announced that he would not run for the presidency and disqualified all military and security personnel, as well as all members of the transitional government from standing for election. Wanké named a 60-member independent national election commission to oversee the establishment of the election roles and the polling. The CRN renounced any form of remuneration during the transition period and moved to reduce by half the salaries of future members of government.

A new constitution designed to spread power among the president, prime minister, and legislature was approved by referendum despite an extremely low voter turnout in July 1999.

== Constitution of 18 July 1999 (Fifth Republic) ==
Niger's 1999 constitution restores the semi-presidential system of government of the December 1992 constitution (Third Republic) in which the President of the Republic is elected by universal suffrage for a five-year term, and a prime minister, named by the president, share executive power. As a reflection of Niger's increasing population, the unicameral National Assembly was expanded in 2004 to 113 deputies elected for a 5-year term under a majority system of representation. Political parties must attain at least 5% of the vote in order to gain a seat in the legislature.

== Constitution of 18 August 2009 (Sixth Republic) ==
In 2009, President Mamadou Tandja organised a constitutional referendum. It offered a Sixth Republic, with a fully presidential system, the suspension of the 1999 Constitution and a 3 years interim government with Tandja for president. It was declared illegal by the Constitutional Court but Tandja dissolved the Court and assumed emergency powers. The opposition boycotted the referendum and the new constitution was adopted with 92.5% of voters and a 68% turnout, according to official results.

== Constitution of 2010 (Seventh Republic) ==
President Mamadou Tandja was ousted on 18 February 2010 by a military coup d'état. The junta, called "Supreme Council for the Restoration of Democracy" and led by Salou Djibo, organised the transition. On 31 October 2010, a new constitution was adopted by referendum with 90.19% in favor and a 52.02% turnout (official results of 25 November).

== 2025 transitional charter ==
On 26 March 2025, a transitional charter replaced the constitution which declared junta leader Abdourahamane Tiani President of Niger for a period of five years. Hausa was declared national language of Niger, replacing French.
