= Robert Jacques (footballer, born 1947) =

French football player and manager

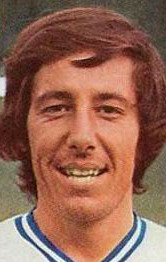
- Jacques with Troyes in 1976

Personal information
- Date of birth: 11 September 1947 (age 79)
- Place of birth: Mont-Saint-Martin, France
- Height: 1.82 m (6 ft 0 in)
- Position: Defender

Youth career
- 1964–1965: Longwy
- 1965–1966: Reims

Senior career*
Years	Team	Apps	(Gls)
1966–1970	Reims	92	(1)
1970–1971	Red Star	3	(0)
1971–1978	Troyes	202	(3)
1978–1980	Tavaux-Damparis		
Total		340+	(10+)

Managerial career
- 1978–1980: Tavaux-Damparis
- * Club domestic league appearances and goals

Robert Jacques (born 11 September 1947) is a French former professional football player and manager.

== After football ==
Jacques was the chief executive of ES Municipaux Troyes from 1985 to 2009.
