= List of athletes at the 2016 Summer Olympics with a prior doping offence =

As of 8 August 2016 11,491 athletes were registered to compete at the 2016 Summer Olympics held in Rio de Janeiro, Brazil.

All Olympic sports are signed up to the World Anti-Doping Agency (WADA) code which operates on a strict liability principle, whereby an athlete is strictly liable for any adverse analytical finding from their urine or blood samples. Until 2015, the standard punishment for a first doping offence was two years suspension. For a second or subsequent offence, the standard punishment is between 8 years suspension and a lifetime ban. From 2015 onwards, the standard suspension for an adverse finding involving an unspecified substance such as steroids and human growth hormone was increased to four years.

In July 2016 the International Olympic Committee (IOC) decided, following the publication of the McLaren Report, that the eligibility of all Russian athletes to compete in the 2016 Olympics must be determined individually by each sport's governing body. This decision was based on the findings about the Russian state-sponsored doping program. Two athletes, swimmer Yuliya Yefimova and cyclist Olga Zabelinskaya, whose participation would not have been allowed under this ruling, was exceptionally allowed to compete by the IOC after their ban was deemed "unenforceable" by the Court of Arbitration for Sport. At least 96 other athletes, representing 52 countries in 13 sports, who were registered to compete have previously been convicted of a doping offence.

== Athletes ==
List of participating athletes with prior doping offence(s)
Name	Country	Sport	Year of violation	Anti-doping rule violation	Sanction	Ref.
Ahmad Hazer	Lebanon	Athletics	2013	Adverse analytical finding (Metenolone)	2 years	
Alejandro Valverde Belmonte	Spain	Cycling	2010	Use or attempted use of a prohibited substance or method (Operación Puerto)	2 years	
Alessandra Aguilar	Spain	Athletics	2011	Adverse analytical finding	3 months	
Alexandr Spac	Moldova	Weightlifting	2013	Adverse analytical finding (Stanozolol, Methyltestosterone)	2 years	
Alexandr Zaichikov	Kazakhstan	Weightlifting	2013	Adverse analytical finding (Stanozolol)	2 years	
Andrea Baldini	Italy	Fencing	2008	Adverse analytical finding (Furosemide)	6 months	
Andreas Ostholt	Germany	Equestrian	2005	Adverse analytical finding – horse (Hydroxy-lidocaine)	1 month	
Andrés Silva	Uruguay	Athletics	2015	Adverse analytical finding (Androstane)	6 months	
Asafa Powell	Jamaica	Athletics	2013	Adverse analytical finding (Oxilofrine)	6 months	
Bobby Lea	United States	Cycling	2015	Adverse analytical finding (Oxycodone)	6 months	
Briken Calja	Albania	Weightlifting	2013	Adverse analytical finding (Androsterone)	2 years	
Bruno de Barros	Brazil	Athletics	2009	Adverse analytical finding (rh-EPO)	2 years	
Christian Ahlmann	Germany	Equestrian	2008	Adverse analytical finding – horse (Capsaicin)	8 months	
Christine Ohuruogu	Great Britain	Athletics	2006	Whereabouts non-compliance	1 year	
Damiano Caruso	Italy	Cycling	2010	Use or attempted use of a prohibited substance or method	2 years (1 suspended)	
Darya Pachabut	Belarus	Weightlifting	2012	Adverse analytical finding (Stanozolol)	2 years	
Daynara de Paula	Brazil	Swimming	2010	Adverse analytical finding (Furosemide)	6 months	
Denis Ulanov	Kazakhstan	Weightlifting	2013	Adverse analytical finding (Stanozolol)	2 years	
Dimitrios Chondrokoukis	Cyprus	Athletics	2012	Adverse analytical finding (Stanozolol)	2 years	
Eric Lamaze	Canada	Equestrian	1996; 2000	Adverse analytical finding (Cocaine); Adverse analytical finding (Ephedrine, Pseudoephedrine, Cocaine)	7 months Warning	
Erik Tysse	Norway	Athletics	2010	Adverse analytical finding (CERA)	2 years	
Esref Apak	Turkey	Athletics	2013	Adverse analytical finding (Stanozolol)	2 years	
Estela García	Spain	Athletics	2011	Adverse analytical finding (Diuretic)	2 years	
Farkhad Kharki	Kazakhstan	Weightlifting	2013	Adverse analytical finding (Metenolone)	2 years	
Femi Ogunode	Qatar	Athletics	2012	Adverse analytical finding (Clenbuterol)	2 years	
Flávia Oliveira	Brazil	Cycling	2009	Adverse analytical finding (Oxilofrine)	1 year and 6 months	
Fränk Schleck	Luxembourg	Cycling	2012	Adverse analytical finding (Xipamide)	1 year	
Frédérick Bousquet	France	Swimming	2010	Adverse analytical finding (Heptaminol)	2 months	
Furkan Şen	Turkey	Athletics	2013	Adverse analytical finding (Dehydrochloromethyltestosterone)	2 years	
Geno Petriashvili	Georgia	Wrestling	2014	Adverse analytical finding (Trimetazidine)	6 months	
Gladys Tejeda	Peru	Athletics	2015	Adverse analytical finding (Furosemide)	6 months	
Gor Minasyan	Armenia	Weightlifting	2013	Adverse analytical finding (Norandrosterone)	2 years	
Grégory Baugé	France	Cycling	2010	Whereabouts non-compliance	1 year	
Hamid Ezzine	Morocco	Athletics	2009	Refusal or failure to submit to doping control	2 years	
Hong Liu	China	Athletics	2016	Adverse analytical finding (Higenamine)	1 month	
Hugo Parisi	Brazil	Diving	2013	Adverse analytical finding (Prednisolone)	3 months	
Inika Mcpherson	United States	Athletics	2014	Adverse analytical finding (Benzoylecgonine)	1 year and 9 months	
Iryna Dekha	Ukraine	Weightlifting	2013	Adverse analytical finding (Stanozolol)	2 years	
Isabell Werth	Germany	Equestrian	2009; 2013	Adverse analytical finding – horse (Fluphenazine); Adverse analytical finding – horse (Cimetidine)	1 year 6 months	
Ivan Emilianov	Moldova	Athletics	2011	Adverse analytical finding (Metenolone, Stanozolol)	2 years	
Ivan Stević	Serbia	Cycling	2008	Use or attempted use of a prohibited substance or method (Oil for Drugs)	2 years	
Ivan Tsikhan	Belarus	Athletics	2004, 2005 (Retested 2012); 2008	Adverse analytical finding (Methandienone, Oxandrolone); Adverse analytical finding (Testosterone)	2 years Overturned on technicality but not exonerated	
Jan Sterba	Czech Republic	Canoeing	2012	Adverse analytical finding (β-Methylphenethylamine)	Warning	
Jiří Orság	Czech Republic	Weightlifting	2013	Adverse analytical finding (Tamoxifen)	2 years	
Justin Gatlin	United States	Athletics	2001; 2006	Adverse analytical finding (Amphetamine); Adverse analytical finding (Testosterone)	2 years (Reinstated after 13 months); 4 years	
Kuk Hyang Kim	North Korea	Weightlifting	2012	Adverse analytical finding (Methyltestosterone, Methandriol)	2 years	
LaShawn Merritt	United States	Athletics	2009–10	Adverse analytical finding (Dehydroepiandrosterone)	1 year and 9 months	
Laverne Jones-Ferrette	Virgin Islands	Athletics	2010	Adverse analytical finding	6 months	
Leevan Sands	Bahamas	Athletics	2006	Adverse analytical finding (Levomethamphetamine)	6 months	
Luvo Manyonga	South Africa	Athletics	2012	Adverse analytical finding (Methamphetamine)	1 year and 6 months	
Mads Glaesner	Denmark	Swimming	2013	Adverse analytical finding (Levomethamphetamine)	3 months	
Man Asaad	Syria	Weightlifting	2010	Adverse analytical finding (Metandienone)	2 years	
Marcelo Melo	Brazil	Tennis	2007	Adverse analytical finding (Isometheptene)	2 months	
Marin Čilić	Croatia	Tennis	2013	Adverse analytical finding (Nikethamide)	4 months	
Mariya Ryemyen	Ukraine	Athletics	2014	Adverse analytical finding (Methandienone)	2 years	
Martina Hingis	Switzerland	Tennis	2007	Adverse analytical finding (Benzoylecgonine)	2 years	
Meryem Erdoğan	Turkey	Athletics	2012	Athlete biological passport anomaly	2 years	
Michael Whitaker	Great Britain	Equestrian	2009	Adverse analytical finding – horse (Altrenogest)	4 months	
Michal Balner	Czech Republic	Athletics	2010	Adverse analytical finding (Cannabis)	1 month	
Muminjon Abdullaev	Uzbekistan	Wrestling	2012	Adverse analytical finding (Nandrolone)	2 years	
Nataliia Lupu	Ukraine	Athletics	2014	Adverse analytical finding (Methylhexaneamine)	9 months	
Nicolas Maréchal	France	Volleyball	2010	Whereabouts non-compliance	6 months	
Nijat Rahimov	Kazakhstan	Weightlifting	2013	Adverse analytical finding (Oxandrolone, Dehydromethyltestosterone)	2 years	
Ning Zetao	China	Swimming	2011	Adverse analytical finding (Clenbuterol)	1 year	
Oleksandr Pielieshenko	Ukraine	Weightlifting	2013	Adverse analytical finding (Stanozolol)	2 years	
Ondrej Kružel	Slovakia	Weightlifting	2012	Adverse analytical finding (Drostanolone)	2 years	
Piotr Lisek	Poland	Athletics	2012	Adverse analytical finding (Methylhexanamine)	6 months	
Rasa Drazdauskaitė	Lithuania	Athletics	2003	Adverse analytical finding (Stanozolol)	2 years	
Rui Alberto Faria da Costa	Portugal	Cycling	2010	Adverse analytical finding (Methylhexanamine)	5 months	
Sandra Perković	Croatia	Athletics	2011	Adverse analytical finding (Methylhexanamine)	6 months	
Sara Moreira	Portugal	Athletics	2011	Adverse analytical finding (Methylhexanamine)	6 months	
Sara Ramadhani	Tanzania	Athletics	2014	Adverse analytical finding (Isometheptene)	2 years	
Semoy Hackett	Trinidad and Tobago	Athletics	2011; 2012	Adverse analytical finding (Methylhexaneamine); Adverse analytical finding (Methylhexaneamine)	6 months 2 years and 4 months	
Shane Rose	Australia	Equestrian	2007	Adverse analytical finding – horse (Pentobarbital)	1 month	
Shelly-Ann Fraser-Pryce	Jamaica	Athletics	2010	Adverse analytical finding (Oxycodone)	6 months	
Sohrab Moradi	Iran	Weightlifting	2013	Adverse analytical finding (Methadone)	2 years	
Steven López	United States	Taekwondo	2006	Adverse analytical finding (L-methamphetamine)	3 months	
Sukanya Srisurat	Thailand	Weightlifting	2011	Adverse analytical finding (Methandienone)	2 years	
Tae-hwan Park	South Korea	Swimming	2015	Adverse analytical finding (Testosterone)	1 year and 6 months	
Tahesia Harrigan-Scott	British Virgin Islands	Athletics	2011	Adverse analytical finding (Methylhexanamine)	6 months	
Tameka Williams	Saint Kitts and Nevis	Athletics	2012	Use or attempted use of a prohibited substance or method Possession of a prohibited substance or method	3 years	
Tatsiana Sharakova	Belarus	Cycling	2012	Adverse analytical finding (Tuaminoheptane)	1 year and 6 months	
Tsholofelo Thipe	South Africa	Athletics	2012	Adverse analytical finding (Norandrosterone, Testosterone)	2 years	
Tuğçe Şahutoğlu	Turkey	Athletics	2013	Adverse analytical finding (Stanozolol)	2 years	
Tyson Gay	United States	Athletics	2013	Adverse analytical finding (Exogenous anabolic-androgenic steroid)	1 year	
Vânia Neves	Portugal	Swimming	2009	Adverse analytical finding (Prednisone)	2 years	
Viktor Troicki	Serbia	Tennis	2013	Refusal or failure to submit to doping control	1 year	
Yang Sun	China	Swimming	2014	Adverse analytical finding (Trimetazidine)	3 months	
Yelena Ryabova	Turkmenistan	Athletics	2013	Adverse analytical finding (Dehydrochloromethyltestosterone)	2 years	
Yelyzaveta Bryzgina	Ukraine	Athletics	2013	Adverse analytical finding (Drostanolone)	2 years	
Yohan Blake	Jamaica	Athletics	2009	Adverse analytical finding (Methylxanthine)	3 months	
Yuri van Gelder	Netherlands	Gymnastics	2009	Adverse analytical finding (Cocaine)	1 year	
Yulia Efimova	Russia	Swimming	2013	Adverse analytical finding (7-Keto-DHEA)	1 year and 4 months	
Olga Zabelinskaya	Russia	Cycling	2014	Adverse analytical finding (octopamine)	1 year and 6 months	
Yuliya Leantsiuk	Belarus	Athletics	2008	Adverse analytical finding (Testosterone)	2 years	
Zalina Marghieva	Moldova	Athletics	2009 (Retested 2013)	Adverse analytical finding (Dehydrochloromethyltestosterone, Stanozolol)	2 years	
Zoltán Kővágó	Hungary	Athletics	2012	Refusal or failure to submit to doping control	2 years	

== See also ==
- Doping at the Olympic Games
