= La Nigérienne =

Former national anthem of Niger

English: The Nigerien
- Former national anthem of Niger
- Lyrics: Maurice Albert Thiriet
- Music: Robert Jacquet and Nicolas Abel François Frionnet
- Adopted: 1961; 65 years ago
- Relinquished: 23 June 2023
- Succeeded by: The Honour of the Fatherland

"La Nigérienne" (French pronunciation: [la ni.ʒe.ʁjɛn]; "The Nigerien"; Hausa: Dan Nijar) is the former national anthem of Niger. The lyrics are by Maurice Albert Thiriet; Robert Jacquet and Nicolas Abel François Frionnet wrote the music. It was adopted as Niger's anthem in 1961 and relinquished in 2023.

== History ==
The anthem was written by French film composer Maurice Albert Thiriet. The music was composed by two other Frenchmen, Robert Jacquet and Nicolas Abel François Frionnet. It was adopted in 1961, a year after Niger gained independence from France.

On 21 November 2019, President Mahamadou Issoufou announced that he had decided to change the national anthem. The decision followed criticism that some of the lyrics appeared to express gratitude to the former coloniser, France, with Nigeriens on social media challenging lines three and four. A committee chaired by Prime Minister Brigi Rafini was "charged with reflecting on the current anthem by providing corrections" and "if possible find a new anthem that responds to the current context of Niger". Created in 2018, it was composed of several members of the Government and about fifteen "experts experienced in writing and musical composition". Assamana Malam Issa, the Minister of Cultural Renaissance, said a hymn must be found "that can galvanize the population, be for us a kind of war cry to touch our patriotic fiber".

On 23 June 2023, the National Assembly adopted The Honor of the Fatherland as Niger's new anthem.

== Lyrics ==
=== French original ===
French lyrics

Auprès du grand Niger puissant
Qui rend la nature plus belle,
Soyons fiers et reconnaissants
De notre liberté nouvelle !

Évitons les vaines querelles
Afin d'épargner notre sang,
Et que les glorieux accents
De notre race soit sans tutelle !

S'élèvent dans un même élan
Jusqu'à ce ciel éblouissant,
Où veille son âme éternelle
Qui fera le pays plus grand !

Refrain :
Debout ! Niger ! Debout !
Que notre œuvre féconde
Rajeunisse le cœur de ce vieux continent !
Et que ce chant s'entende
Aux quatre coins du monde
Comme le cri d'un peuple équitable et vaillant !

Debout ! Niger ! Debout !
Sur le sol et sur l'onde,
Au son des tam-tams
Dans leur rythme grandissant,
Restons unis toujours,
Et que chacun réponde
À ce noble avenir
Qui nous dit: En avant !

IPA transcription (Note: See Help:IPA/French and African French.)

[opɾe dy gɾɑ̃ niʒe pɥisɑ̃]
[ki ɾɑ̃ la natyɾə ply bɛlə]
[swajõ fjez‿e ɾəkɔnɛsɑ̃]
[də nɔtɾə libɛɾte nuvɛlə]

[evitõle vɛnə kəɾɛlə]
[afɛ̃ depaɾɲe nɔtɾə sɑ̃]
[e kəle glɔɾjøz‿ aksɑ̃]
[də nɔtɾə ɾasə swa sɑ̃ tytɛlə]

[selɛvə dɑ̃z‿ œ̃ mɛm elɑ̃]
[ʒyska sə sjɛl eblwisɑ̃]
[u vɛjə sõn‿ ɑm etɛɾnɛlə]
[ki fəɾa ləpei ply gɾɑ̃]

[ɾəfɾɛ̃]
[dəbu niʒe dəbu]
[kə nɔtɾ œvɾə fekõdə]
[ɾaʒœnisə lə kœɾ də sə vjø kõtinə]
[e kə sə ʃɑ̃ sɑ̃tɑ̃də]
[o katɾə kwɛ̃ dy mõdə]
[kɔmə lə kɾi dœ̃ pœpl ekitable vajɑ̃]

[dəbu niʒe dəbu]
[syɾ lə sɔle syɾ lõdə]
[o sõde ta-tɑ̃]
[dɑ̃ lœɾ ɾitmə gɾɑ̃disɑ̃]
[ɾɛstõz‿ yni tuʒuɾ]
[e kə ʃakœ̃ ɾepõdə]
[a sə nɔbl avəniɾ]
[ki nu dit:ɑ̃n‿ avɑ̃]

=== Translations ===
Hausa lyrics

A duk faɗin ƙasar Nijar mai ƙarfi
Wanda yake sanya yanayi da kyau,
Bari mu kasance masu girman kai da godiya
Don sabon 'yancinmu!

Mu guji yawan jayayya
Domin mu tsare kanmu daga zubar da jini,
Kuma da daukaka muryoyin
Raceabilarmu ta 'yanci daga mamayar!

Mu tashi a tsalle guda
Ya yi tsayi kamar sama,
Inda ya tsare har abada rai
Wanene zai sa ƙasar ta girma!

Ƙungiyar mawaƙa:
Tashi! Nijar! Tashi!
Ka sanya ayyukanmu masu amfani
Ka sake zuciyar zuciyar wannan tsohuwar nahiya!
Bari kuma a ji waƙar
A cikin sasannoni huɗu na duniya
Kamar kukan mai adalci da jaruntaka!

Tashi! Nijar! Tashi!
A kan ƙasa, da a kan raƙuman ruwa,
Zuwa cikin sautin wakoki
A cikin girma waƙoƙi
Bari mu kasance da haɗin kai koyaushe,
Kuma kowa ya amsa
Zuwa wannan kyakkyawar makoma
Wanne ya gaya mana: Ku ci gaba!

English translation

Throughout great powerful Niger
Which makes nature more beautiful,
Let us be proud and grateful
For our newfound freedom!

Let us avoid vain quarrels
In order to spare ourselves bloodshed,
And may the glorious voices
Of our race be free of domination!

Let us rise in a single leap
As high as the dazzling sky,
Where stands guard its eternal soul
Which will make the country greater!

Chorus:
Arise! Niger! Arise!
May our fruitful labours
Rejuvenate the heart of this old continent!
And may the song be heard
In the four corners of the Earth
As the cry of a fair and valiant people!

Arise! Niger! Arise!
On the ground and on the wave,
To the sound of the drums
In their growing rhythms
Let us always remain united,
And may each one respond
To this noble future
Which tells us: Go forward!
