= Coat of arms of Niger =

- Armiger: Republic of the Niger
- Adopted: 1958
- Shield: Vert, a sun rayonned or, accosted to dexter with a spear in pale charged with two Touareg swords in saltire, and to sinister with three ears of millet, one in pale and two in saltire, accompanied in point with a head of zebu, all or
- Supporters: This shield rests on a trophy formed by four flags of the Republic of Niger
- Motto: République du Niger "Republic of Niger"

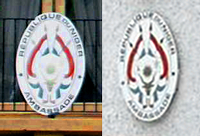
Comparisons of the official coat of arms of Niger, as used in two Embassies of the Republic of Niger (to Canada and to the United States of America). Note the differences in both scale and shield colour with the seal used on documents of the President and National Assembly of the Republic of Niger.

The coat of arms of Niger shows a trophy of four national flags, in the colors orange, white, and green. In the middle, the state seal is arranged. On a green or gold shield the four golden symbols are shown. In the middle, there is a sun, to the left there is a vertical spear with two crossed Tuareg swords, to the right are three pearl millet heads and underneath is the frontal view of a zebu head. Under the coat of arms, there is a ribbon bearing the name of the country in French language: République du Niger. While the constitution of Niger stipulates the color of the symbols upon the shield, there is no uniformity on the color of the shield. The 1999 Constitution reproduces the text of earlier constitutions, making a distinction between the Seal of State (Le Sceau de l'État) for which no shield colour is stipulated and the Coat of Arms of the Republic (Les Armoiries de la République) for which Sinople is stipulated as the shield colour. Sinople is analogous to Vert (Green) in heraldry, but official buildings and documents do not display green shields. Embassies and official documents use white, with gold emblems. The website of the President of Niger uses gold or yellow with dark gold or black emblems. The National Assembly of Niger meets below a large coat of arms with the shield coloured gold and the emblems in a darker gold.

== Official description ==
Article 1 of the Constitution of Niger describes the coat of arms as follows:

The coat of arms of the Republic consists of a shield vert, a sun rayonned or, accosted to dexter with a spear in pale charged with two Touareg swords in saltire, and to sinister with three ears of millet, one in pale and two in saltire, accompanied in point with a head of zebu, all or. This shield rests on a trophy formed by four flags of the Republic of Niger. The inscription "République du Niger" is placed underneath

== Gallery ==
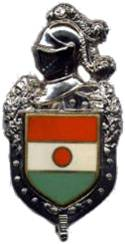

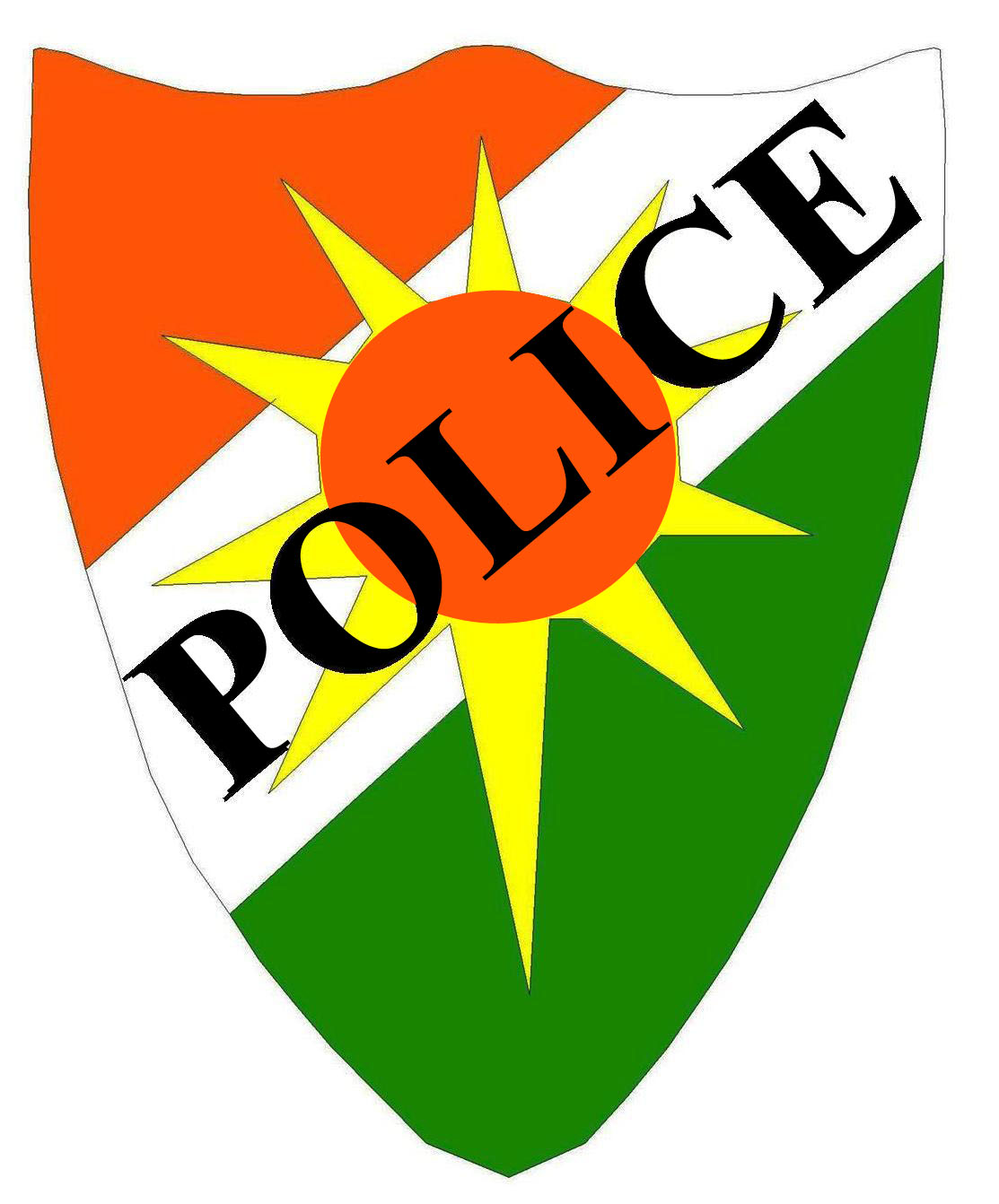
