= The Honour of the Fatherland =

National anthem of Niger

- National anthem of Niger
- Adopted: 23 June 2023; 3 years ago
- Preceded by: "La Nigerienne"

Audio sample
- file; help

The Honour of the Fatherland (French: L'Honneur de la Patrie; Hausa: Darajar Ƙasa) is the national anthem of Niger. It was adopted on 23 June 2023, replacing La Nigerienne, which was adopted in 1961, a year after the country's gaining of independence.

== History ==
Niger, a former colony of France, became an independent country in 1960. The following year, the country adopted La Nigerienne as its national anthem. In 2019, President Mahamadou Issoufou announced his plans to replace La Nigerienne, following concerns that the lyrics expressed perceived gratitude towards the colonial power. A committee was established to reflect on the current anthem and find a new anthem if necessary. On June 23, 2023, the National Assembly adopted The Honor of the Fatherland as the country's new anthem to replace La Nigerienne.

== Lyrics ==
French lyrics

Des rives du Niger aux confins du Ténéré
Frères et sœurs nous sommes
Enfants d’une même Patrie le Niger
Nourris de la sève des mêmes idéaux
Pour un Niger de paix libre fort et uni
Pour un Niger prospère le Pays de nos rêves
Pour l’honneur de la Patrie
Incarnons la vaillance et la persévérance
Et toutes les vertus de nos dignes aïeux
Guerriers intrépides déterminés et fiers
Défendons la patrie au prix de notre sang
Faisons du Niger symbole de dignité
Emblème et flambeau de l’Afrique qui avance
Pour ces nobles idéaux debout et en avant
En avant pour le travail en avant pour le combat
Nous demeurons debout
Portant haut le drapeau de notre cher Pays
Dans le ciel d’Afrique et dans tout l’Univers
Pour construire ensemble
Un monde de justice de paix et de progrès
Et pour faire du Niger la fierté de l’Afrique.

Hausa lyrics

Daga Bankunan Nijar zuwa kan iyakokin Ténéré
Yan'uwa mune
Ƴaƴan kasar uba daya Nijar
Rarraba da ruwan ƴaƴan itace iri ɗaya
Domin kasar Nijar mai karfi da hadin kai mai zaman lafiya
Ga kasar Nijar mai albarka kasar burinmu
Don darajar Uban
Haɗa ƙarfin hali da juriya
Da dukkan kyawawan halaye na magabata na kwarai
Jarumai marasa tsoro sun ƙudura da girman kai
Kare kasar nan akan kudin jininmu
Mu sanya Nijar ta zama alamar mutunci
Tambari da fitilar ciyar da Afirka gaba
Don waɗannan maɗaukakin maɗaukaki tsaya ku tafi
Gaba don aikin gaba don yaƙin
Mun tsaya a tsaye
Dauke tutar kasarmu mai daraja
A cikin sararin samaniyar Afirka da ko'ina cikin Duniya
Don gina tare
Duniyar adalci, zaman lafiya da ci gaba
Da kuma sanya Nijar ta zama abin alfaharin Afirka.

English translation

From the shores of the Niger to the edges of the Ténéré
Brothers and sisters we are
Children of a same fatherland Niger
Fed of the sap of the same ideals
For a Niger of peace, free, strong, and united
For a prosperous Niger, the country of our dreams
For the honor of the fatherland
Let us incarnate the valiance and the perseverance
And all the virtues of our worthy forefathers
Intrepid, determined and proud warriors
Let us defend the homeland at the price of our blood
Let us make Niger the symbol of dignity
The emblem and torch of Africa advancing
For these noble ideals, arise and go forward
Forward for work and forward for the fight
We remain standing
Holding high the flag of our dear country
In the sky of Africa and in the whole universe
To construct together
A world of justice, peace and progress
And to make Niger the pride of Africa
