= Libya–Niger relations =

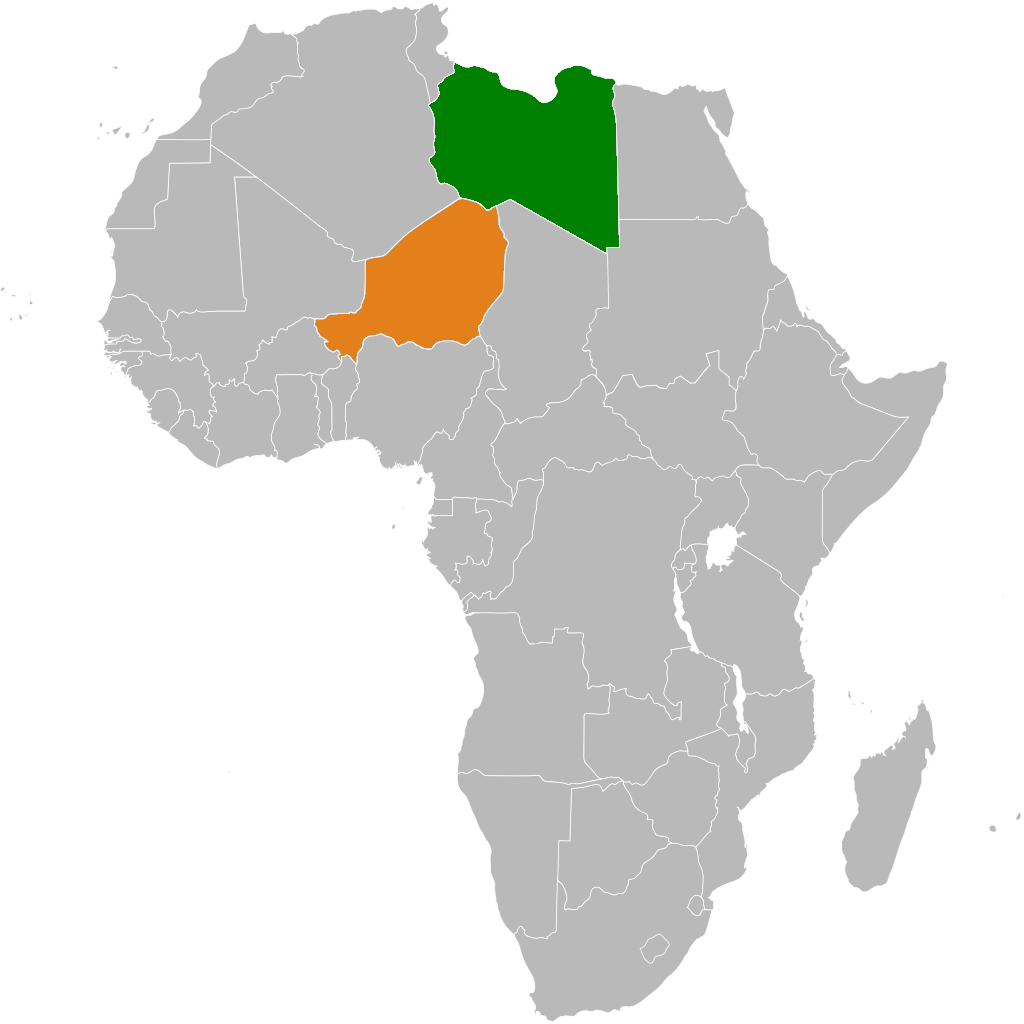

- Libya: Niger

Libya–Niger relations are the bilateral relations between Libya and Republic of Niger. The two countries are members of the Group of 77 and the United Nations.

== During and After Libyan Civil War ==
Libyan relations with Niger since the formation of the National Transitional Council have been somewhat tenuous, though Niger recognised the NTC as Libya's legitimate governing authority on 27 August 2011.

In early September 2011, a large convoy of Libyan military vehicles that the NTC said included stockpiles of gold bullion belonging to the Libyan treasury, as well as members of the Gaddafi government, crossed into Niger, allegedly with assistance from Nigerien Tuaregs. The NTC called on the Nigerien government to stop the convoy and arrest wanted members of the government, warning of consequences for Libya–Niger relations if it failed to do so. However, after briefly denying the convoy's presence in Niger, the Nigerien government later said it was considering granting refugee status to the Libyans, including military commanders Ali Kana and Mansour Dhao, both wanted by the NTC on charges of crimes against the Libyan people, as they were not sought by the International Criminal Court. A similar scenario played out when Al-Saadi Gaddafi, one of Muammar Gaddafi's sons and a top military commander during the war, entered Niger and was placed under house arrest by the government but was then granted refuge status in the country, over the protests of the NTC and its allies. On 1 October, Nigerien Justice Minister Marou Amadou reiterated his government's refusal to extradite Al-Saadi Gaddafi, but said the NTC was welcome to interrogate him in Niamey, Niger's capital. The Nigerien government has officially acknowledged receiving 32 wanted members of the government, but refuses to turn them over to the NTC on humanitarian grounds. On 11 November, Nigerien President Mahamadou Issoufou said his government had officially decided to grant asylum to Al-Saadi Gaddafi.

After Saadi Gaddafi made comments calling for an uprising against the NTC in Libya, a spokesman for the Libyan interim authority said on 11 February 2012 that Tripoli demanded Niger extradite Saadi and other ex-regime officials to face trial in Libya. The Nigerien government must send the fugitives from justice back to their home country, the NTC spokesman demanded, in order for Niger to "preserve its relationship and interests" in Libya. However, Nigerien government officials rejected the demand, citing the country's policy of not extraditing anyone who could face capital punishment.

== Resident diplomatic missions ==
- Libya has an embassy in Niamey.
- Niger has an embassy in Tripoli.

== See also ==
- Libya–Niger border
- Foreign relations of Libya
- List of diplomatic missions of Libya
- List of diplomatic missions in Libya
- Foreign relations of Niger
- List of diplomatic missions in Niger
- List of diplomatic missions of Niger
