= M. Daouda Diallo =

Nigerian politician

- Born: 1939; Dosso, Niger
- Died: 28 June 2014 (aged 74–75)
- Resting place: Lamorde
- Citizenship: Nigerien

Daouda Diallo (born 1939 in Dosso, Niger – 28 June 2014 in Niamey) was a Nigerien politician who served as the Minister of Foreign Affairs of Niger from 1979 to 1983.

== Life ==
Daouda Diallo attended primary school in Dori, Say, and Niamey. Between 1968 and 1972, he received training as a radio broadcaster at the Office de Coopération Radiophonique (OCORA) in Paris, an organization that supported radio broadcasting in former French colonies such as Niger.

Following the military coup of April 15, 1974, in which the Supreme Council of the Armed Forces led by Seyni Kountché seized power, Daouda was appointed head of the Association des Amis du Niger (Association of Friends of Niger), based at the Nigerien Embassy in Paris. Later that year, he returned to Niger and assumed the role of Director of the Office de Radiodiffusion Télévision du Niger (ORTN), the state broadcasting agency.

From 1985, Diallo served as Minister of Information, Culture, Posts and Telecommunications. In 1987, his official title was briefly Minister of Culture and Communication, until he left the government that same year following the death of Seyni Kountché.

== Death ==
He died in 2014 and was buried in Lamordé, his family's burial ground.
