= Foreign relations of Niger =

Niger pursues a moderate foreign policy and maintains friendly relations with both East and West. It is a member state of the United Nations. Niger maintains a special relationship with France and enjoys close relations with its West African neighbours.

== Multilateral relations ==
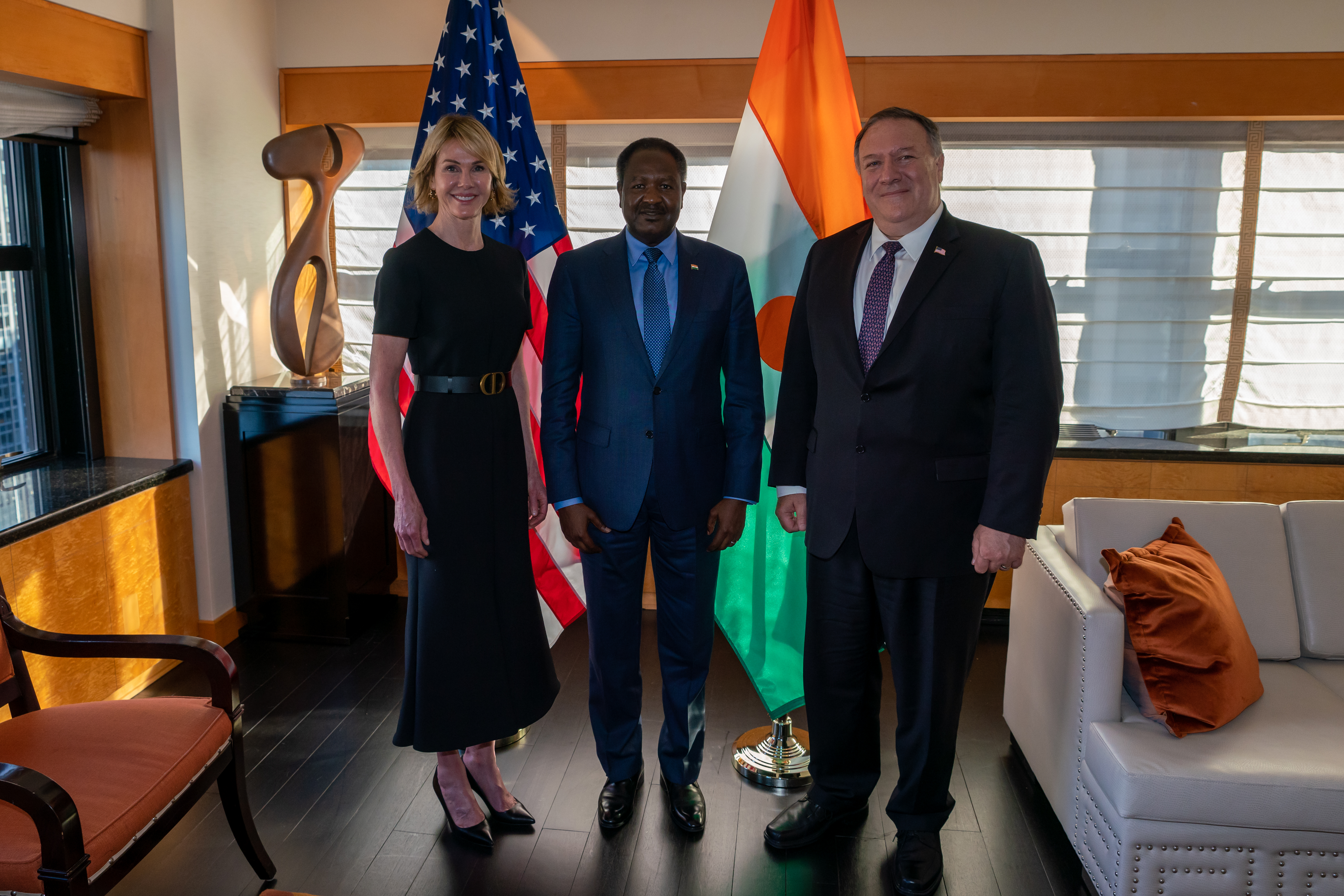
US Ambassador to the United Nations Kelly Craft and US Secretary of State Mike Pompeo meet with Niger Ambassador to the United Nations Abdou Abarry

It is a charter member of the Organization of African Unity and the West African Monetary Union. Also, it belongs to the Niger Basin Authority and the Lake Chad Basin Commission, the Economic Community of West African States, the Non-Aligned Movement, and the Organisation of Islamic Cooperation. Niger belongs to the United Nations and its main specialized agencies and, in 1980-81, served on the UN Security Council. The first president of Niger, Hamani Diori, maintained close relations with the West and became internationally prominent in his diplomatic work, seeking to broker resolutions to conflicts in Africa and beyond. His involvement as a negotiator was particularly prominent during the Nigerian Civil War.

Niger maintains a permanent purpose to the United Nations Headquarters in New York City, at 417 East 50th Street. In 2009, its Ambassador to the United Nations was Ibrahim A. Abani.

== Diplomatic relations ==
List of countries which Niger maintains diplomatic relations with:

#	Country	Date
1	Germany	2 August 1960
2	United Kingdom	3 August 1960
3	United States	3 August 1960
4	France	4 August 1960
5	Japan	16 March 1961
6	Switzerland	26 May 1961
7	Nigeria	8 June 1961
8	South Korea	27 July 1961
9	Ghana	24 August 1961
10	Belgium	22 September 1961
11	Italy	23 September 1961
—	Israel (suspended)	9 November 1961
12	Netherlands	20 December 1961
13	Liberia	1961
14	Sierra Leone	1961
15	Lebanon	11 March 1962
16	Guinea	20 March 1962
17	Canada	27 April 1962
18	Mali	1 August 1962
19	Togo	26 October 1962
20	Luxembourg	18 December 1962
21	Egypt	7 July 1963
22	Morocco	1 October 1963
23	Sudan	1963
24	Norway	24 January 1964
25	Austria	30 January 1965
26	Algeria	12 March 1965
27	Denmark	25 May 1965
28	Sweden	26 May 1965
29	Spain	May 1965
30	Ethiopia	6 October 1965
31	Pakistan	15 October 1965
32	Libya	17 November 1965
33	Peru	November 1965
34	Syria	13 September 1966
35	Saudi Arabia	20 November 1966
36	Kuwait	22 November 1966
37	Turkey	30 March 1967
38	Gabon	22 April 1968
39	Tunisia	24 April 1968
40	Romania	20 June 1969
41	Mauritania	4 December 1969
42	Iceland	26 January 1970
—	Sovereign Military Order of Malta	9 January 1971
43	Poland	30 June 1971
—	Holy See	20 July 1971
44	Democratic Republic of the Congo	12 August 1971
45	Russia	17 February 1972
46	Serbia	17 March 1972
47	Zambia	29 September 1972
48	Hungary	3 February 1973
49	Senegal	2 March 1973
50	Bulgaria	5 March 1973
51	Ivory Coast	30 October 1973
52	Cameroon	13 February 1974
53	China	20 July 1974
54	North Korea	6 September 1974
55	Bahrain	11 November 1974
56	Vietnam	7 March 1975
57	Uganda	8 April 1975
58	Iran	11 June 1975
59	Argentina	23 June 1975
60	United Arab Emirates	9 July 1975
61	Portugal	10 July 1975
62	Brazil	24 October 1975
63	Mexico	6 November 1975
64	Finland	28 November 1975
65	Czech Republic	22 December 1975
66	Rwanda	1975
67	Cuba	25 April 1976
68	India	18 July 1977
69	Barbados	25 June 1979
70	Guyana	25 June 1979
71	Jamaica	25 June 1979
72	Greece	June 1979
73	Trinidad and Tobago	1979
74	Albania	18 June 1980
75	Angola	28 August 1980
76	Oman	3 September 1980
77	Gambia	23 February 1981
78	Central African Republic	9 May 1981
79	Kenya	12 May 1981
80	Burkina Faso	30 June 1981
81	Philippines	16 December 1981
82	Haiti	17 December 1981
83	Benin	14 May 1982
84	Thailand	30 July 1982
85	Qatar	14 September 1982
86	Bangladesh	17 February 1983
87	Yemen	4 January 1985
88	Zimbabwe	10 February 1986
89	Colombia	5 October 1988
—	State of Palestine	18 January 1989
90	Brunei	1 May 1990
91	Jordan	25 July 1990
92	South Africa	9 May 1994
93	Slovakia	26 April 1995
94	Azerbaijan	10 October 1995
95	Bosnia and Herzegovina	18 October 1995
96	Singapore	1 June 1998
—	Ukraine (suspended)	1 October 1999
97	North Macedonia	15 November 2000
98	Cyprus	17 September 2002
99	Venezuela	8 October 2005
100	Estonia	12 October 2005
101	Slovenia	22 June 2006
102	Laos	8 December 2006
103	Botswana	21 December 2006
104	Saint Vincent and the Grenadines	31 May 2007
105	Guatemala	13 November 2007
106	Ireland	Before April 2008
107	Malta	11 December 2008
108	Liechtenstein	17 December 2008
109	Djibouti	20 April 2009
110	Australia	7 May 2009
111	Paraguay	2010
112	Indonesia	21 September 2011
113	Belarus	29 March 2012
114	Latvia	17 April 2012
115	Malaysia	24 April 2012
116	Georgia	30 May 2012
—	Kosovo	25 January 2013
117	Uruguay	6 March 2013
118	Equatorial Guinea	5 November 2013
119	Namibia	26 March 2014
120	Mozambique	29 March 2014
121	Lithuania	30 May 2014
122	Fiji	9 September 2014
123	Montenegro	12 September 2014
124	Seychelles	18 November 2014
125	Mongolia	25 March 2015
126	Madagascar	13 January 2016
127	Malawi	8 March 2016
128	Armenia	26 November 2016
129	Tanzania	23 March 2017
130	Lesotho	17 August 2017
131	Tajikistan	26 August 2017
132	Nepal	20 September 2017
133	Kazakhstan	21 September 2017
134	Mauritius	26 March 2018
135	Dominican Republic	28 September 2018
136	Nicaragua	8 August 2019
137	Monaco	9 October 2019
138	Comoros	21 November 2020
139	Guinea-Bissau	10 February 2021
140	Turkmenistan	22 June 2021
141	Andorra	5 April 2022
142	Burundi	25 April 2023
143	South Sudan	19 July 2023
144	Eritrea	17 November 2023
145	Somalia	15 January 2026
146	Cape Verde	26 February 2026
147	Cambodia	26 September 2026
148	Kyrgyzstan	26 September 2026
149	Chad	Unknown
150	Republic of the Congo	Unknown
151	Iraq	Unknown
152	New Zealand	Unknown

== Bilateral relations ==
Country	Formal Relations Began	Notes
Benin		Despite the occasional recurrence of a border conflict over Lété Island in the Niger River, Benin and Niger, both former French subjects of French West Africa, relations are close. Niger relies on the port at Cotonou, and to a lesser degree Lomé (Togo), and Port Harcourt (Nigeria), as its main route to overseas trade. Niger operates a Nigerien Ports Authority station, as well as customs and tax offices in a section of Cotonou's port, so that imports and exports can be directly transported between Gaya and the port. French Uranium mines in Arlit, which produce Niger's largest exports by value, travel through this port to France or the world market.
Canada	27 April 1962	Both countries established diplomatic relations on 27 April 1962: Canada is accredited to Niger from its embassy in Bamako, Mali.; Niger is accredited to Canada from its embassy in Washington, D.C., United States.
Chad		Chad has an embassy in Niamey.; Niger has an embassy in N'Djamena.
China	20 July 1974	See China–Niger relations China established diplomatic relations with Niger on July 20, 1974. On June 19, 1992, the transitional government of Niger declared the reestablishment of the "diplomatic relations" with Taiwan. The Chinese Government thus announced its suspension of diplomatic relations with Niger on July 30 of the same year. On August 19, 1996, China and Niger re-established diplomatic relations.: China has an embassy in Niamey.; Niger has an embassy in Beijing.
France	4 August 1960	See France–Niger relations Both countries established diplomatic relations on 4 August 1960 Niger has maintained close ties with France, its former colonial power. Following Niger's independence in 1960, France maintained several hundred advisers at all levels of Niger's government and military. In the 1960s, the Military of Niger was drawn entirely from Nigerien former members of the French Colonial Forces: officered by Frenchmen who agreed to take joint French-Nigerien citizenship. In 1960 there were only ten African officers in the Nigerien army, all of low rank. President Diori signed legislation to end the employment of expatriate military officers in 1965, some continued to serve until the 1974 coup, when all French military presence was evacuated. As well, the French had maintained until 1974 around 1,000 troops of the 4th Régiment Interarmes d'Outre-Mer (Troupes de Marine) with bases at Niamey, Zinder, Bilma and Agadez. In 1979 a smaller French force was again based permanently in Niger. Franco-Nigerien relations continue to be close, with France as Niger's top export partner (in value), and the French government being almost entirely dependent upon Niger for the Uranium which fuels its extensive Nuclear Power system, mined in the northern town of Arlit.: France has an embassy in Niamey.; Niger has an embassy in Paris.
Germany	2 August 1960	See Germany–Niger relations Both countries established diplomatic relations on 2 August 1960: Germany has an embassy in Niamey.; Niger has an embassy in Berlin.
India	18 July 1977	See India–Niger relations: India has an embassy in Niamey.; Niger maintains an embassy in New Delhi.
Italy	23 September 1961	Both countries established diplomatic relations on 23 September 1961 when first Ambassador of Italy to Niger M. Renzo Luigi Romanelli, presented his credentials to President of Niger Diori Hamani. In December 2017, Prime Minister Paolo Gentiloni announced that 470 Italian soldiers would be deployed to Niger in an effort to mitigate the European migrant crisis.
Kosovo	25 January 2013	Niger officially recognised the Republic of Kosovo on 15 August 2011. Kosovo and Niger established diplomatic relations on 25 January 2013.
Libya	17 November 1965	See Libya–Niger relations
Mali	1 August 1962	Both countries established diplomatic relations on 1 August 1962 Niger has close relations with its neighbour Mali, with large scale trade links and sizable population movement between the two nations. Both were subject states in French West Africa. Niger and Mali have fought related Tuareg insurgencies in their respective northern territories in the 1990s and mid-2000s. The road border entering Niger from Benin at Gaya. Niger relies on its neighbors, especially Benin and Nigeria for seaports which provide access to world markets.
Mexico	6 November 1975	Both countries established diplomatic relations on 6 November 1975: Mexico is accredited to Niger from its embassy in Abuja, Nigeria.; Niger is accredited to Mexico from its embassy in Washington, D.C., United States.
Nigeria	8 June 1961	See Niger–Nigeria relations Both countries established diplomatic relations on 8 June 1961 when M. Elhad Camatte Hammodon Maiga, ambassador of Niger to Nigeria presented his letters of credentials to the Governor General Azikiwe Nigeria maintains close relations with the Republic of Niger, in part because both nations share a large Hausa minority on each side of their 1,500 km (930 mi) border. Hausa language and cultural ties are strong, but there is little interest in a pan-Hausa state. The two nations formed the Nigeria-Niger Joint Commission for Cooperation (NNJC), established in March, 1971 with its Permanent Secretariat in Niamey, Niger.: Niger has an embassy in Abuja.; Nigeria has an embassy in Niamey.
Russia		See Niger–Russia relations: Niger has an embassy in Mosow.; In April 2025, Russian Foreign Minister Sergey Lavrov announced that Russia would reopen its embassy in Niger.
Spain	May 1965	See Niger–Spain relations: Niger is accredited to Spain from its embassy in Paris, France.; Spain has an embassy in Niamey.
Turkey	30 March 1967	See Niger–Turkey relations: Niger has an embassy in Ankara.; Turkey has an embassy in Niamey.; Trade volume between the two countries was US$72 million in 2019.
United States	3 August 1960	See Niger–United States relations Both countries established diplomatic relations on 3 August 1960 A conservative foreign policy has meant that under Niger's first president and—following military coup—the 1974–1991 military government, Niger maintained good relations with the United States, Israel, and NATO governments in general. During the Cold War, Niger maintained a non-confrontational attitude to the Soviet Union and its allies. Recently after Washington added Niger to the list of 39 countries for which visa issuance was suspended, Niger retaliated by banning the entry of American citizens and announcing that it would stop issuing entry visas to American citizens as of August 28, 2025.: Niger has an embassy in Washington, D.C.; United States has an embassy in Niamey.

== Other ==
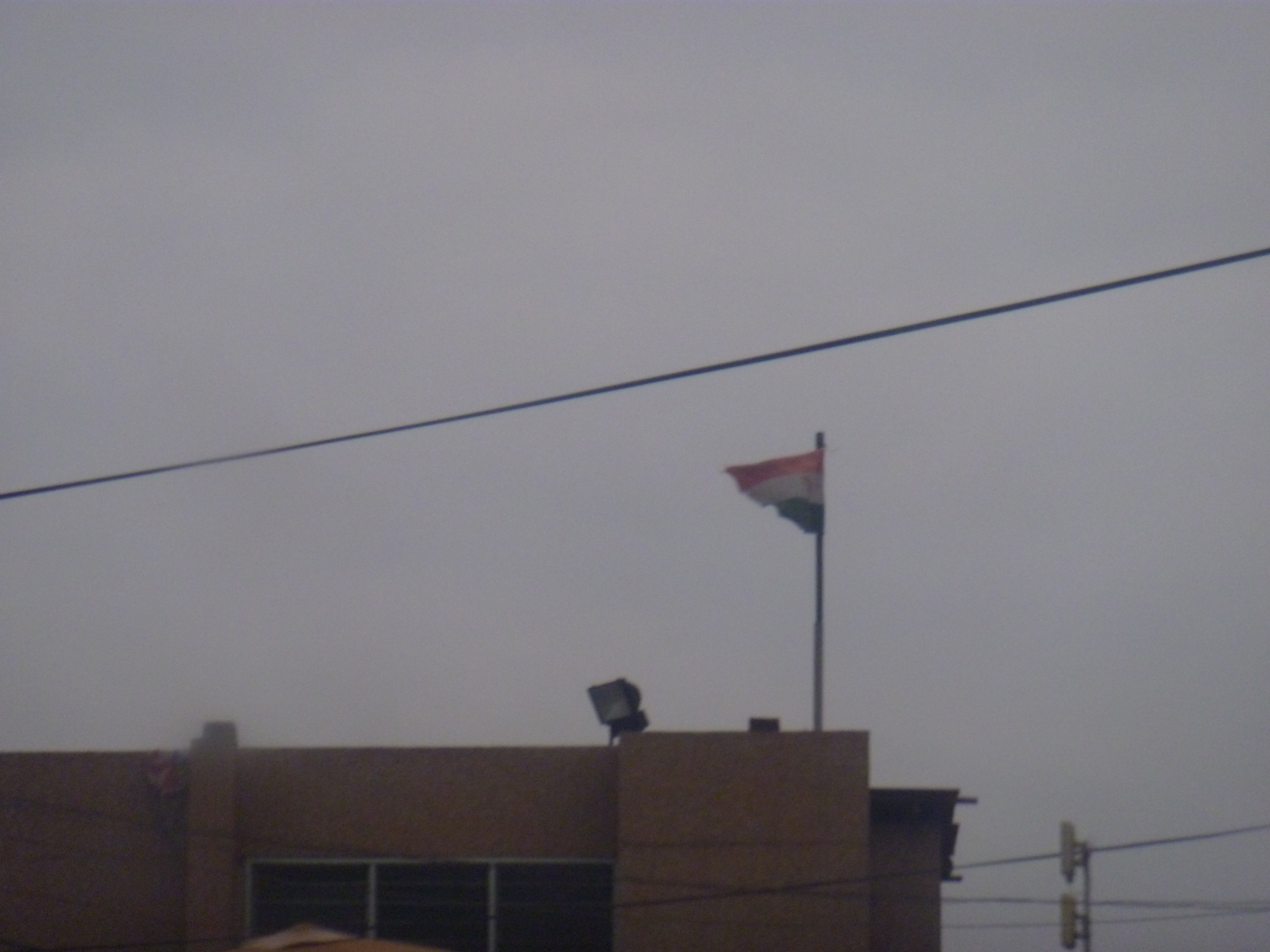
Niger's office in Accra, Ghana

Niger has only 24 permanent embassies abroad, although more have permanent representation in Niamey, either through national embassies or other representatives. The United Kingdom, for instance, operates its permanent office for relations to Niger from Accra, Ghana, while Niger's permanent representative resides at the Nigerien Embassy in Paris.

Many other small or distant nations have no formal diplomatic relations with Niamey except through their respective consulates at the United Nations Headquarters in New York City. Australia, for instance, only signed the instruments of formal diplomatic relations with Niamey on 7 May 2009, through their respective consular officials at the UN.

== Border disputes ==
Libya has in the past claimed a strip along their border of about 19,400 km^{2} in northern Niger. There have been several decades of unresolved discussions regarding the delimitation of international boundaries in the vicinity of Lake Chad between Niger, Nigeria, Chad, and Cameroon. The lack of firm borders, as well as the receding of the lake in the 20th century led to border incidents between Cameroon and Chad in the past. An agreement has been completed and awaits ratification by Cameroon, Chad, Niger, and Nigeria.

Niger has an ongoing conflict with Benin over Lété Island, an island in the River Niger approx. 16 kilometres long and 4 kilometres wide, located around 40 kilometers from the town of Gao, Niger. Together with other smaller islands in the River Niger, it was the main object of a territorial dispute between Niger and Benin, which had begun when the two entities were still under French rule. The island, and seasonally flooded land around it is valuable to semi-nomadic Puel cattle herders as a dry season pasturage. The two countries had almost gone to war over their border in 1963 but finally chose to settle by peaceful means. In the early 90s a joint delimitation commission was tasked with solving the issue but could not reach an agreement. In 2001 the two parties chose to have the International Court of Justice (ICJ) decide on the matter once and for all. In 2005, the ICJ ruled in Niger's favour.

Niger has ongoing processes delimiting sections of their borders with Burkina Faso and Mali, disputes which date back to the colonial period. These entities, along with Benin and other nations which do not border Niger, were semi independent elements of French West Africa. Within the colonial administration, borders were frequently changed, with Niger colony once possessing large portions of what is now Burkina Faso and Mali, as well as much of northern Chad, later associated with French Equatorial Africa. Disputes between these post-independence nations have been minor and peaceful.

== See also ==
- List of diplomatic missions in Niger
- List of diplomatic missions of Niger
