= Niger–Turkey relations =

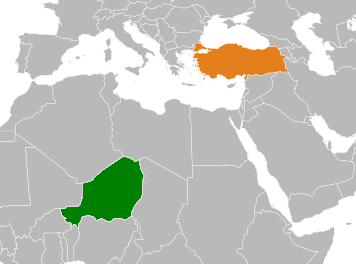
- Niger: Turkey

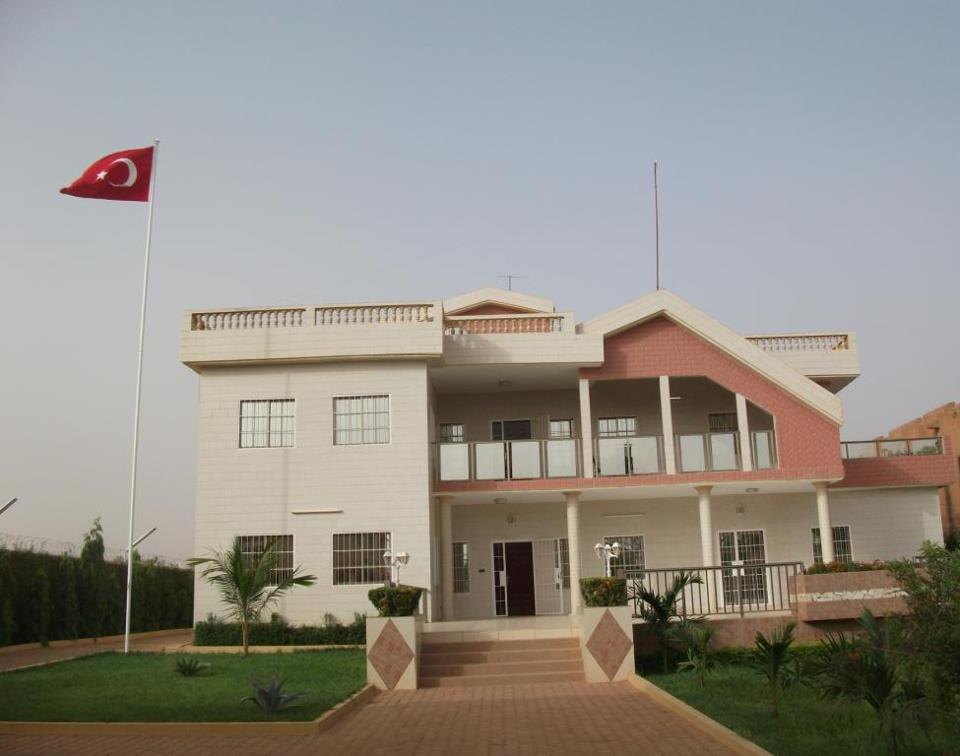
Turkish embassy in Niamey

Niger–Turkey relations are the foreign relations between Niger and Turkey. Turkey has an embassy in Niamey since January 2012 while Niger has an embassy in Ankara since October 2012 and consulates in Istanbul, Bursa and Antalya. 29 international treaties and agreements were signed between the 2 countries since 2012.

Then Prime Minister of Turkey Recep Tayyip Erdoğan visited Niger once in January 2013 while the President of Niger Mahamadou Issoufou visited Turkey once in March 2014 and Prime Minister of Niger Brigi Rafini visited Turkey once in January 2018.

The trade volume between two nations was $46,485,000 in 2013, $35,272,000 in 2014 and $31,351,000 in 2015, almost all of it being Turkish exports to Niger. Trade volume reached $72,000,000 in 2019.

== See also ==
- Foreign relations of Niger
- Foreign relations of Turkey
