= Germany–Niger relations =

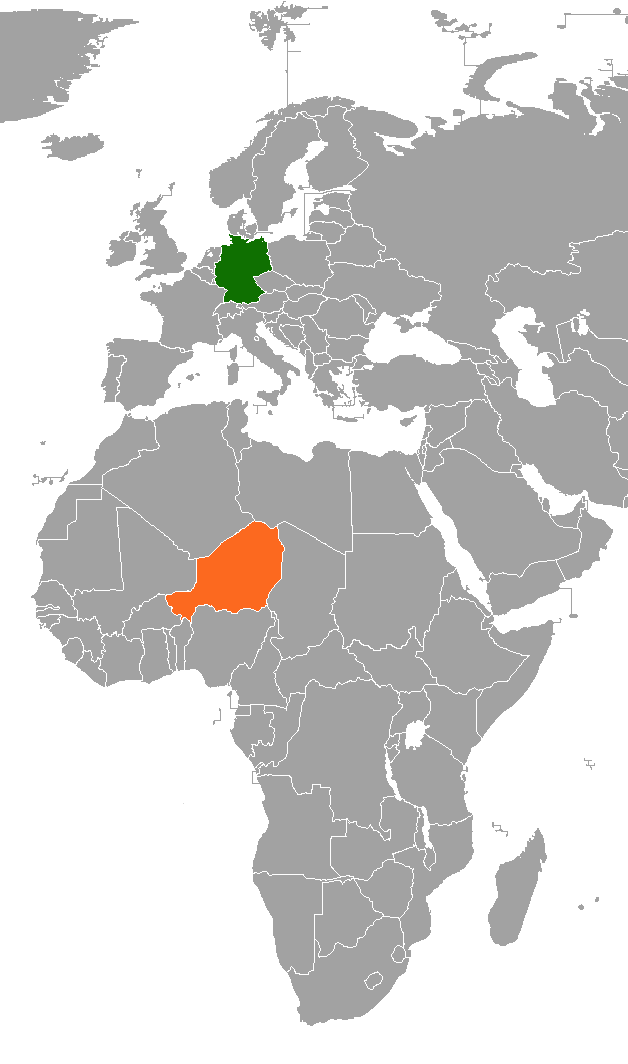

- Germany: Niger

Germany–Niger relations focus primarily on cooperation in development, security, and migration policy. Since 2016, bilateral relations have been significantly intensified, with several state visits at the highest level.

== History ==
West Germany opened an embassy in Niamey in 1963. From the beginning, cooperation was primarily focused on development cooperation. One year later, a treaty on the promotion of capital investments was signed, and in 1968 the predecessor organization of today's Gesellschaft für Internationale Zusammenarbeit sets up an office in Niamey. After the abandonment of the Hallstein Doctrine, Niger also maintained official diplomatic relations with the German Democratic Republic from 1975 until German reunification. (GDR). In 1977, a technical cooperation agreement was agreed.

On November 15, 1999, the German embassy was closed in the face of unrest that erupted after the assassination of President Ibrahim Baré Maïnassara, and reopened on September 6, 2002.

In 2010, the German government temporarily suspended development aid to the country following the military coup against Nigerien President Mamadou Tandja.

After 2016, relations between the two countries were intensified significantly. That year, Development Minister Gerd Müller, Foreign Minister Frank-Walter Steinmeier, Defense Minister Ursula von der Leyen and German Chancellor Angela Merkel visited the country. In return, Niger's President Mahamadou Issoufou visited Germany several times between 2016 and 2018. During government negotiations, German development aid was doubled to over 115 million for the period 2018–2020. Per capita, the country thus became one of the largest recipients of aid. In May 2019, Chancellor Merkel visited the country again as part of a West Africa trip. The agenda included security policy, cooperation in the fight against illegal migration and transnational drug trafficking, and the development partnership between the two countries.

As of 2012, Germany is participating in the EU civilian mission EUCAP Sahel Niger, which aims to train Niger's police, national guard, and gendarmerie and enable them to effectively combat organized crime and terrorism. The Bundeswehr is also training forces and security personnel in Niger. From 2013, Germany used a base in Niamey since 2013 as a supply hub for its forces in neighbouring Mali where they were serving as part of the United Nations peacekeeping mission MINUSMA. In May 2022, Chancellor Olaf Scholz visited the base. Shortly after the European Union ended its military mission in the country in 2024, Germany kept its military air transport hub in Niamey open. However, negotiations to extend the agreement of operating its airbase in Niamey fell apart, because the base's personnel would no longer benefit immunity from prosecution. On 30 August 2024, the German Army withdrew troops from junta-run Niger, ending an eight-year mission.

== Economic relations ==
Due to poverty in the country, Niger is not a major buyer of German goods. The countries' bilateral trade volume in 2021 was a comparatively modest 27 million euros.

Germany has been an important partner in development cooperation for decades. From 1962 to about 2022, development aid given was over one billion euros. Priority areas include food security, governance, education, health, migration management, and employment. The long-standing partnership gives Germany a good public image in the country.

== Sports ==
The Germans Heinz-Peter Überjahn (1980) and Gernot Rohr (2012-2014) were coaches of the Niger national football team.

== Diplomatic missions ==
- Germany has an embassy in Niamey.
- Niger has an embassy in Berlin.

== See also ==
- Foreign relations of Germany
- Foreign relations of Niger
