= Niger–Spain relations =

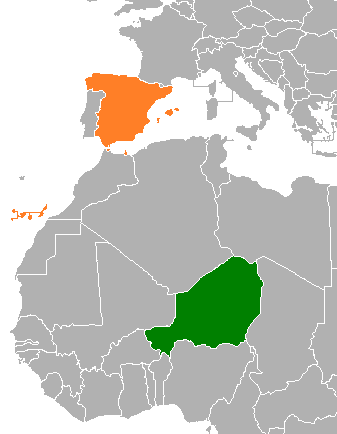
- Niger: Spain

Niger–Spain relations are the bilateral and diplomatic relations between these two countries. Spain has an embassy in Niamey. Niger is accredited to Spain from its embassy in Paris, France.

== Diplomatic relations ==
Spain maintains diplomatic relations with Niger since May 1965. The Spanish Embassy in Niamey began its activities in August 2007. The Technical Cooperation Office opened in summer 2009. The Ministry of Interior opened in April 2011 and the Ministry of Interior Presidency in 2013.

Bilateral relations are very good especially in the chapters of political dialogue and cooperation (African, Sahelian and West African ECOWAS), development cooperation (Niger is one of the 23 priority countries of Spanish cooperation) and cooperation in JHA matters ( illegal migration, documentary fraud, police cooperation, training).

== Cooperation ==
The priority character that Niger currently has for Spanish cooperation is manifested in the fact that in the current IV Master Plan it remains one of the 23 countries of concentration of its cooperation. In this sense, the signing of the document of adoption of the Spanish-Nigerien Country Association Framework in September 2014 by the foreign ministers Margallo and Bazoum in Madrid, opens a new period of cooperation that extends until 2016 and in which there is the commitment of the Spanish cooperation to disburse more than 20 million euros in these three years, around two priority sectors: Rural Development and Food and Nutrition Security; and the Health sector. These commitments are consistent with the priorities of the Nigerien Government and are expressed in the Country Partnership Framework in Spain's proposal to “contribute to the improvement of Food and Nutrition Security of the most vulnerable Nigerien population, preventing their causes, intervening on their effects and building resilience at local, national and regional levels."

== See also ==
- Foreign relations of Niger
- Foreign relations of Spain
