= Libya–Niger border =

International border

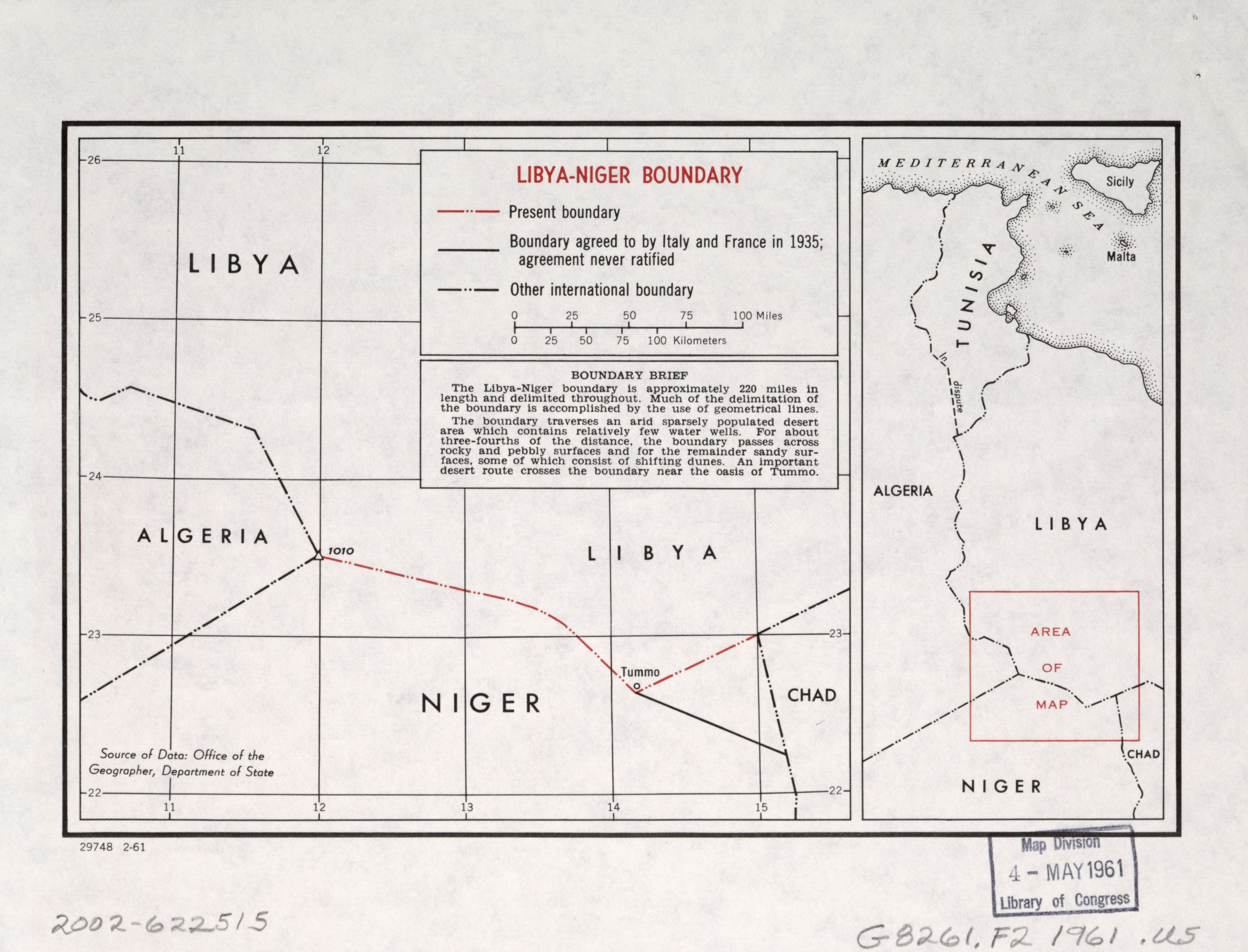
Map of the Libya-Niger border

The Libya–Niger border is 342 kilometres (213 miles) in length and runs from the tripoint with Algeria in the west to the tripoint with Chad in the east.

== Description ==
The border starts in the west at the Algerian tripoint, just to the north of the Salvador Passage. It then proceeds in a south-easterly direction, curving further to the south down to Tumu, whereupon it veers sharply to the north-east up to the Chadian tripoint. The borders runs through a remote stretch of the Sahara desert.

== History ==
The 1880s saw intense competition among European powers for territories in Africa, a process known as the Scramble for Africa. The process culminated in the Berlin Conference of 1884, in which the European nations concerned agreed upon their respective territorial claims and the rules of engagements going forward. As a result of this France gained control the upper valley of the Niger River (roughly equivalent to the areas of modern Mali and Niger). France occupied this area in 1900, declaring it the military territory of Niger, ruled originally from Zinder. Niger was originally included, along with modern Mali and Burkina Faso, within the Upper Senegal and Niger colony, however it was split off in 1911 and became a constituent territory of the federal colony of French West Africa (Afrique occidentale française, abbreviated AOF).

Italy meanwhile, which desired territory in the area of modern Libya, sought to emulate the colonial expansion of the other European powers, and they indicated their recognition of the above line to France on 1 November 1902. The Ottoman Empire had ruled the coastal areas of what is today Libya since the 16th century, organised into the Vilayet of Tripolitania, with an ill-defined border in the south. In September 1911 Italy invaded Tripolitania, and the Treaty of Ouchy was signed the following year by which the Ottomans formally ceded sovereignty of the area over to Italy. The Italians organised the newly conquered region into the colonies of Italian Cyrenaica and Italian Tripolitania, and gradually began pushing the limits of the territories to the south; later, in 1934, they united the two territories as Italian Libya. France and Italy delimited the border between French Algeria and Italian Libya in 1919, which also covered the segment of the modern Libya–Niger border as far south as Tumu. The precise details of the delimitation of the section east from Tumu to the Chad tripoint remains somewhat hazy, however the convention line as currently in place appears to have been agreed upon at some time in this period. The Libya-Niger border was formerly longer than it is currently, prior to the transfer on 18 March 1931 of the Tibesti Mountains from Niger to Chad.

During the North African Campaign of the Second World War, Italy was defeated and its African colonies were occupied by the Allied powers, with Libya split into British and French zones of occupation. Libya was later granted full independence on 2 December 1951. A Franco-Libyan treaty was signed on 1 August 1955 which recognised the existing boundary. Niger later gained independence from France on 3 August 1960 and the border became an international frontier between two independent states.

In recent years the border region has gained renewed focus, due to increasing numbers of African migrants crossing it, seeking to reach Europe. France has started to assist in policing the border in recent years given the insecurity there, from the Madama army base in northern Niger, 100 kilometres (62 miles) south of the Libyan border.

== Border Crossings ==
The main border crossing is at Tumu, Libya.

== See also ==
- Libya-Niger relations
