= List of diplomatic missions in Niger =

This is a list of diplomatic missions in Niger. At present, the capital city of Niamey hosts 28 embassies.

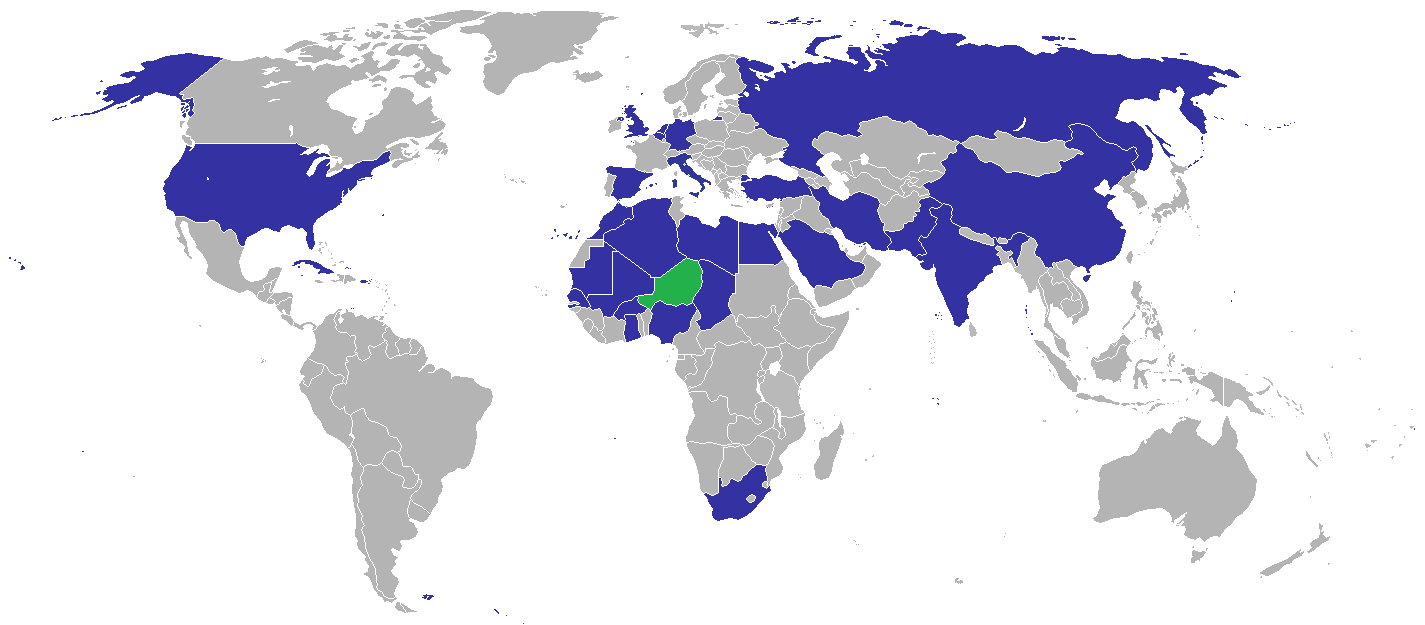
Map of diplomatic missions in Niger

== Diplomatic missions in Niamey ==
=== Embassies ===
1. Algeria
2. Belgium
3. Burkina Faso
4. Chad
5. China
6. Cuba
7. Egypt
8. Germany
9. Ghana
10. India
11. Iran
12. Italy
13. Libya
14. Mali
15. Mauritania
16. Morocco
17. Netherlands
18. Nigeria
19. Pakistan
20. Russia
21. Saudi Arabia
22. Senegal
23. South Africa
24. Sovereign Military Order of Malta
25. Spain
26. Turkey
27. United Kingdom
28. United States

=== Other missions or delegations ===
1. European Union (Delegation)

== Consulates ==
=== Agadez ===
- Algeria
- Libya

== Gallery ==
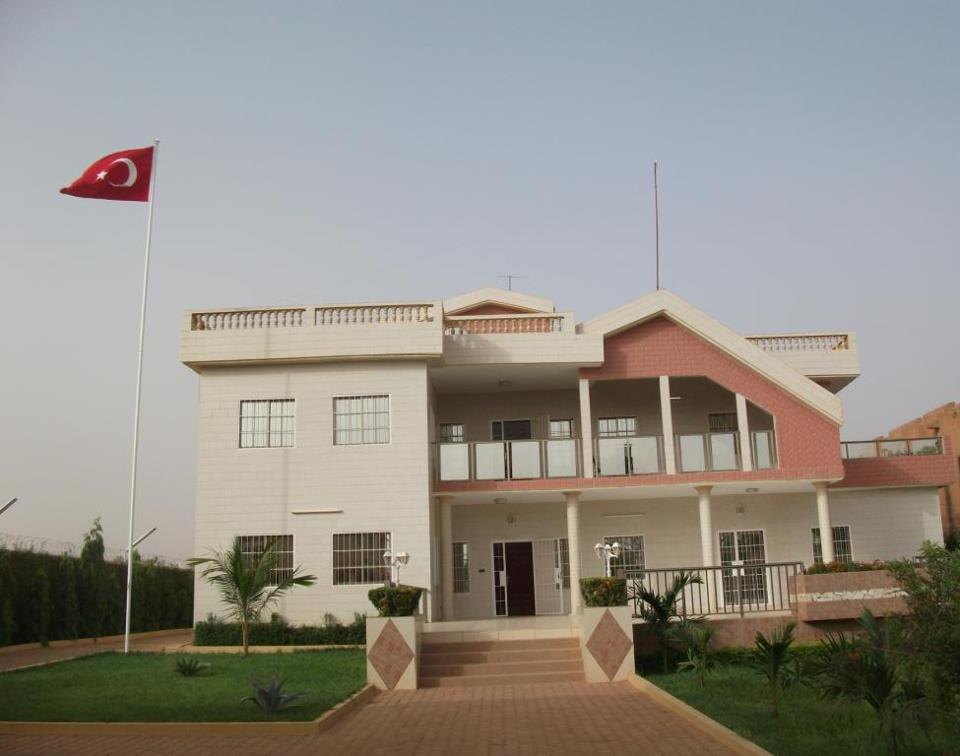
Embassy of Turkey

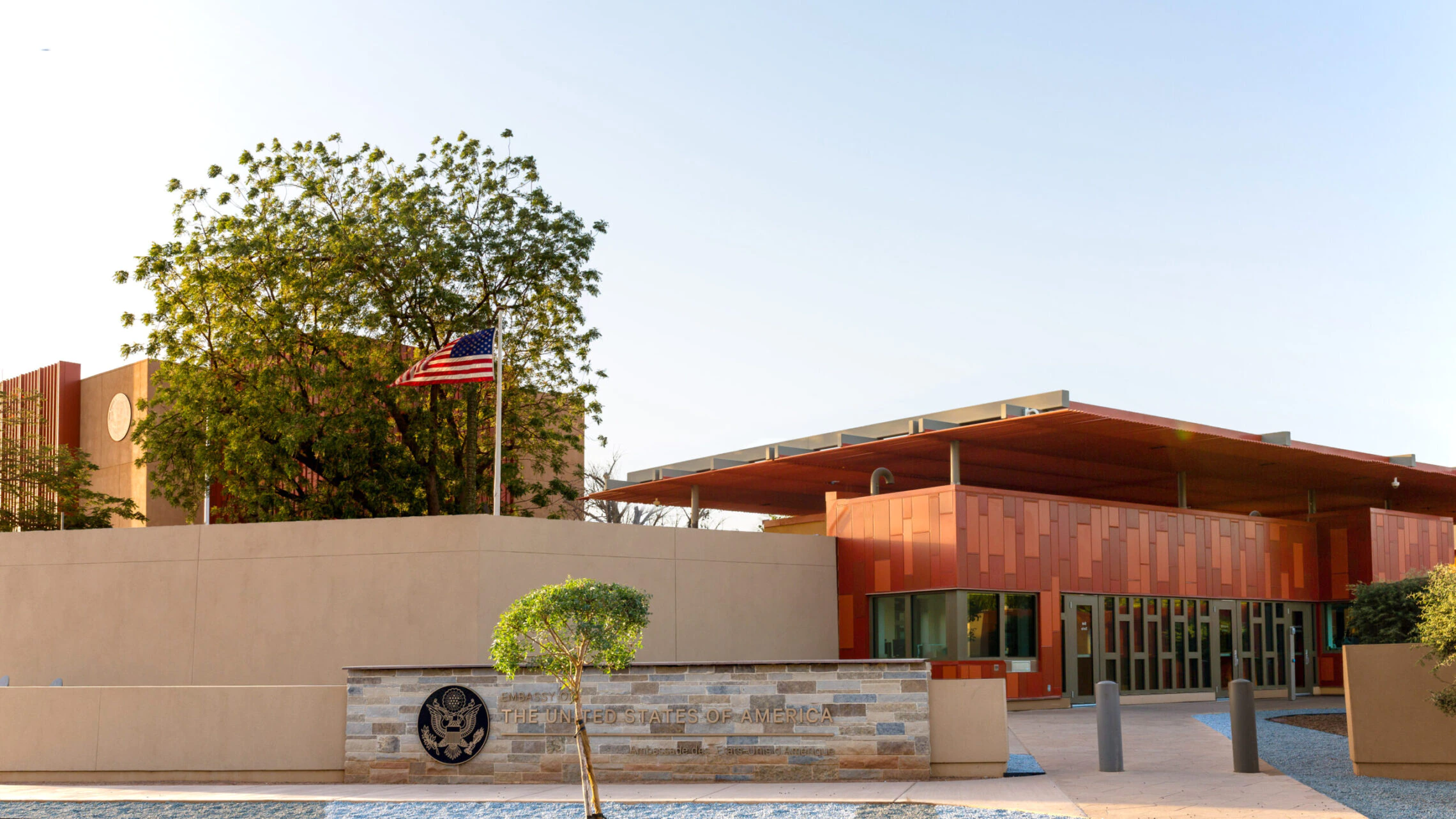
Embassy of the United States

== Non-resident embassies ==
- Afghanistan (Cairo)
- Argentina (Abuja)
- Australia (Abuja)
- Austria (Algiers)
- Azerbaijan (Cairo)
- Bahrain (Tripoli)
- Bangladesh (Abuja)
- Brazil (Abuja)
- Bulgaria (Algiers)
- Cameroon (Abuja)
- Canada (Abidjan)
- Central African Republic (N'Djamena)
- Colombia (Cairo)
- Costa Rica (Paris)
- Croatia (Paris)
- Cyprus (Tripoli)
- Czech Republic (Abuja)
- Denmark (Ouagadougou)
- Equatorial Guinea (Abuja)
- Greece (Dakar)
- Indonesia (Abuja)
- Iraq (Tripoli)
- Ireland (Abuja)
- Italy (Abidjan)
- Ivory Coast (Ouagadougou)
- Japan (Abidjan)
- Kenya (Abuja)
- Lesotho (Tripoli)
- Malaysia (Accra)
- Maldives (Riyadh)
- Malta (Valletta)
- Mexico (Abuja)
- Nicaragua (Ouagadougou)
- Norway (Dakar)
- Panama (Cairo)
- Philippines (Tripoli)
- Poland (Tunis)
- Portugal (Abuja)
- Qatar (Abuja)
- Romania (Abuja)
- Serbia (New York City)
- Seychelles (Addis Ababa)
- Slovakia (Algiers)
- Somalia (Juba)
- South Korea (Abuja)
- Switzerland (Abuja)
- Tanzania (Abuja)
- Thailand (Abuja)
- United Arab Emirates (N'Djamena)
- United Kingdom (Bamako)
- Vietnam (Algiers)
- Zambia (Abuja)

== Former embassies ==
1. Benin (2026)
2. Canada
3. France (2024)
4. South Korea (1989)

== See also ==
- Foreign relations of Niger
- List of diplomatic missions of Niger
