= Niger–Russia relations =

- Niger: Russia

Historically, Niger and Russia have had very little contact. However, following the 2023 Nigerien coup d'état, the two nations became close allies, with Russia becoming the new Nigerien government's preferred military partner.

== History ==
=== Early relations and Cold War ===
Niger, a former French colony, had virtually no direct contact with the Russian Empire. After Niger gained independence in 1960, the Soviet Union sought to establish ties, but engagement remained limited. Niger's first president, Hamani Diori, kept a pro-Western stance and maintained close relations with France and its allies. Unlike some neighboring states (for example, Mali, where many elites studied in Moscow during the 1960s), Niger did not align with the Eastern Bloc. Diplomatic relations with the USSR were eventually established in the early 1970s, but the relationship was largely symbolic and low-key. Diori's government (1960–1974) and the military regime that followed continued to rely on France, the United States, and other Western partners for aid and security.

=== Relations After 1991 ===
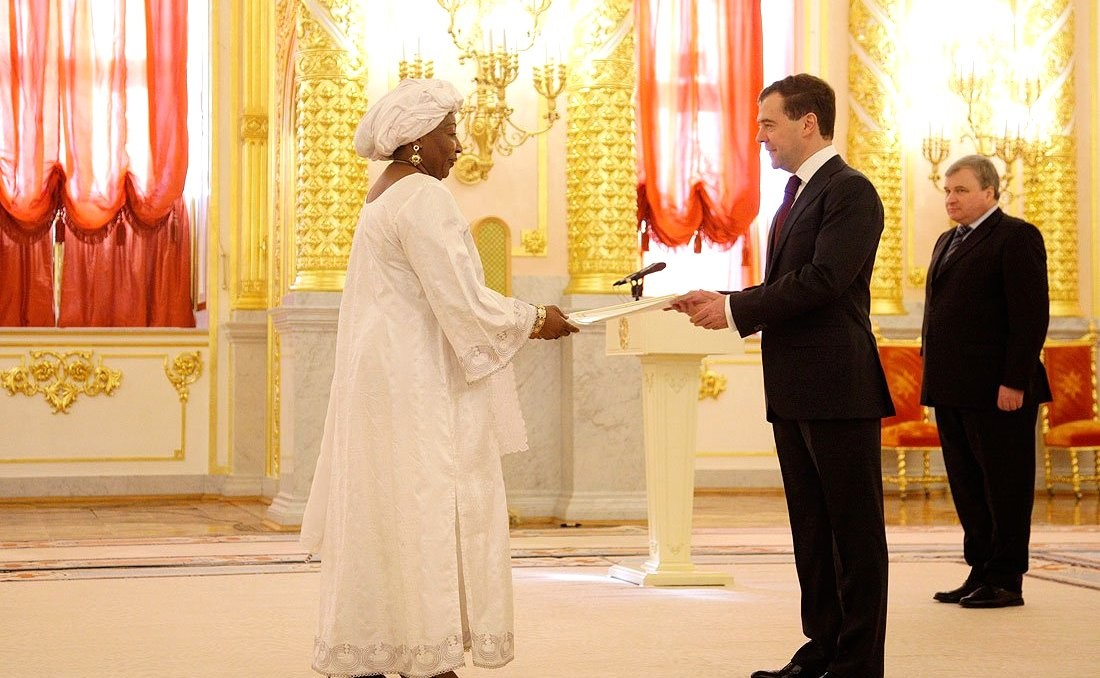
Dmitry Medvedev with Amina Djibo Bazindre (2010)

With the dissolution of the Soviet Union in 1991, Niger's ties to Moscow entered a long lull. The new Russian Federation scaled back its diplomatic footprint in Africa, even closing its embassy in Niamey in the 1990s. For over three decades thereafter, Russia had no resident embassy in Niger. Bilateral interactions were scarce. Niger's governments in the 1990s and 2000s remained aligned with Western nations and international institutions, relying on France, the U.S., and the EU for development aid and security partnerships.

Under President Mahamadou Issoufou (2011–2021) and President Mohamed Bazoum (2021–2023), Russia remained a secondary player compared to France and the U.S. Notably, President Bazoum took pro-Western positions internationally, including backing Ukraine at the United Nations during the 2022 Russian invasion.

==== 2023 Niger military coup ====
A watershed came with Niger's 2023 military coup. On July 26, 2023, the Nigerien army led by General Abdourahamane Tiani ousted Bazoum's elected government. In the aftermath, the new junta dramatically pivoted away from Western partners and reached out to Russia. Within months, Niger's military leaders revoked key security agreements with France and the United States and expelled Western troops from its soil. Moscow – which had only limited prior involvement in Niger – quickly signaled support for the junta. In late 2023 and early 2024, high-level contacts multiplied: Tiani held a phone call with Russian President Vladimir Putin to discuss strengthened cooperation, and the junta's Prime Minister Ali Lamine Zeine visited Moscow to seek deeper partnerships in defense, energy, and agriculture. In November 2024, Russian Deputy Prime Minister Alexander Novak led a high-level delegation to Niger, coinciding with meetings of the new Sahel alliance (AES) in Bamako and Niamey.

In April 2025, Russian Foreign Minister Sergey Lavrov announced that Russia would reopen its embassy in Niger by 2025.

== Economic ties ==
Bilateral economic ties between Niger and Russia have historically been small, but they are now focused on strategic resources. By June 2025, Niamey moved to nationalize the Somair uranium mine, explicitly linking this policy to Niger's pivot away from France and toward new partners. In this context, Niger's leaders have actively courted Russian involvement. In November 2024, Niger's mining minister declared that Russian firms were invited to invest in Niger's uranium and other natural resources, amid the breakdown in ties with France. In mid-2024, reports emerged that Rosatom – Russia's state nuclear energy corporation – was seeking ways to take over the uranium facilities and permits formerly held by Orano. In March 2024, a Nigerien delegation attended the Atomexpo forum in Sochi (Russia's flagship nuclear industry conference) to discuss closer nuclear cooperation.

Beyond uranium, gold and other minerals have featured in discussions. Niger has significant gold deposits, and reports suggest the junta may offer Russian entities access to some gold mining concessions in exchange for security backing. For instance, in late 2023 a Nigerien official hinted that certain gold mines might be given to Russian partners as part of expanded cooperation. This mirrors Russia's pattern in other African states (like Mali and Sudan), where Kremlin-linked private companies (often associated with the Wagner Group) have pursued gold mining deals.

In early 2024, Niger and Russia signed memoranda on strengthening cooperation in agriculture and fertilizer supply to help Niger's food security.

== Security cooperation ==
After the July 2023 coup, Niger's new military regime made security cooperation with Russia a top priority. The junta, feeling threatened by potential regional intervention and the loss of French/U.S. support, sought assistance from Moscow. Russian officials responded positively. In August 2023, as the coup leaders faced condemnation from ECOWAS and Western nations, thousands of Nigeriens rallied in Niamey waving Russian flags – a public signal of welcome to Russian involvement. Yevgeny Prigozhin, the chief of Russia's Wagner Group mercenary company, even applauded the Nigerien coup via a Telegram message, calling it a victory against colonizers and offering Wagner's services to the new authorities

In the months that followed, formal military agreements were indeed inked between Niamey and Moscow. On December 4, 2023, Niger's defense chief (General Salifou Modi) met Russian Deputy Defense Minister Yunus-Bek Yevkurov in Niamey to sign a memorandum on military cooperation. This accord provided for an expanded Russian role in training and advising Niger's army, and reportedly for the deployment of a contingent of Russian military instructors to Niger. On-the-ground presence of Russian personnel in Niger began materializing in late 2023 and 2024. By October 2023, unconfirmed reports suggested small numbers of Russian “instructors” had arrived in Niger, transiting via Libya. Then, in April 2024, a Russian transport plane landed in Niamey delivering a shipment of military hardware and about 100 Russian troops. The 100 Russian personnel, described as the “Africa Corps” (a unit name used for re-hatted Wagner fighters under Russian command), were deployed as trainers and advisers to the Nigerien military.

== See also ==
- List of ambassadors of Russia to Niger
