= List of diplomatic missions of Niger =

Niger Countries that host Nigerien embassies Countries that host only Nigerien consular missions

This is a list of diplomatic missions of Niger, excluding honorary consulates. Niger maintains permanent diplomatic missions in 25 nations around the world, both on the ambassadorial and the consular level. The diplomatic staff of the Republic of Niger reports to the Presidency of Niger through the Nigerien Ministry of Foreign Affairs and Cooperation. It belongs to the United Nations and its main specialized agencies and in 1980-81 served on the UN Security Council. Niger maintains a special relationship with France and enjoys close relations with its West African neighbours. It is a charter member of the Organisation of African Unity and the West African Monetary Union and also belongs to the Niger River Commission and the Lake Chad Basin Commission, the Economic Community of West African States, the Non-Aligned Movement, and the Organisation of the Islamic Cooperation.

== Africa ==
- Algeria
  - Algiers (Embassy)
  - Tamanrasset (Consulate)
- Benin
  - Cotonou (Embassy)
- Burkina Faso
  - Ouagadougou (Consulate-General)
- Cameroon
  - Yaoundé (Embassy)
- Chad
  - N'Djamena (Embassy)
- Egypt
  - Cairo (Embassy) (Note: Also accredited to Eritrea, Palestine, & Sudan.)
- Ethiopia
  - Addis Ababa (Embassy) (Note: Also accredited to Kenya, Rwanda, & United Nations Environment Programme .)
- Ghana
  - Accra (Embassy)
- Ivory Coast
  - Abidjan (Embassy)
- Libya
  - Tripoli (Embassy)
  - Sabha (Consulate)
- Mali
  - Bamako (Embassy)
- Morocco
  - Rabat (Embassy)
- Nigeria
  - Abuja (Embassy)
  - Kano (Consulate-General)
- Senegal
  - Dakar (Embassy)
- South Africa
  - Pretoria (Embassy) (Note: Also accredited to Mozambique.)
- Sudan
  - Khartoum (Consulate-General) (Note: Subordinate to the embassy in Cairo.)
- Togo
  - Lomé (Embassy)

== Americas ==
- Cuba
  - Havana (Embassy)
- United States
  - Washington, D.C. (Embassy)

== Asia ==
- China
  - Beijing (Embassy)
- India
  - New Delhi (Embassy) (Note: Also accredited to Australia, Malaysia, & New Zealand.)
- Iran
  - Tehran (Embassy) (Note: Also accredited to Turkmenistan.)
- Kuwait
  - Kuwait City (Embassy) (Note: Also accredited to Bahrain.)
- Qatar
  - Doha (Embassy)
- Saudi Arabia
  - Riyadh (Embassy) (Note: Also accredited to Oman.)
  - Jeddah (Consulate-General)
- Turkey
  - Ankara (Embassy)
- United Arab Emirates
  - Abu Dhabi (Embassy)
  - Dubai (Consulate)

== Europe ==
- Belgium
  - Brussels (Embassy) (Note: Also accredited to Netherlands & Organisation for the Prohibition of Chemical Weapons.)
- Denmark
  - Copenhagen (Embassy) (Note: Also accredited to Finland, Iceland, Norway, & Sweden.)
- France
  - Paris (Embassy) (Note: Also accredited to Holy See & Spain.)
- Germany
  - Berlin (Embassy) (Note: Also accredited to Hungary, Latvia, Lithuania, & Serbia.)
- Italy
  - Rome (Embassy) (Note: Also accredited to Greece.)
- Russia
  - Moscow (Embassy) (Note: Also accredited to Azerbaijan.)

== Multilateral organisations ==
- United Nations
  - New York City (Permanent Mission) (Note: Also accredited to Guatemala.)
  - Geneva (Permanent Mission) (Note: Also accredited to Austria, Liechtenstein, & Switzerland.)
- UNESCO
  - Paris (Permanent Mission)

== Gallery ==
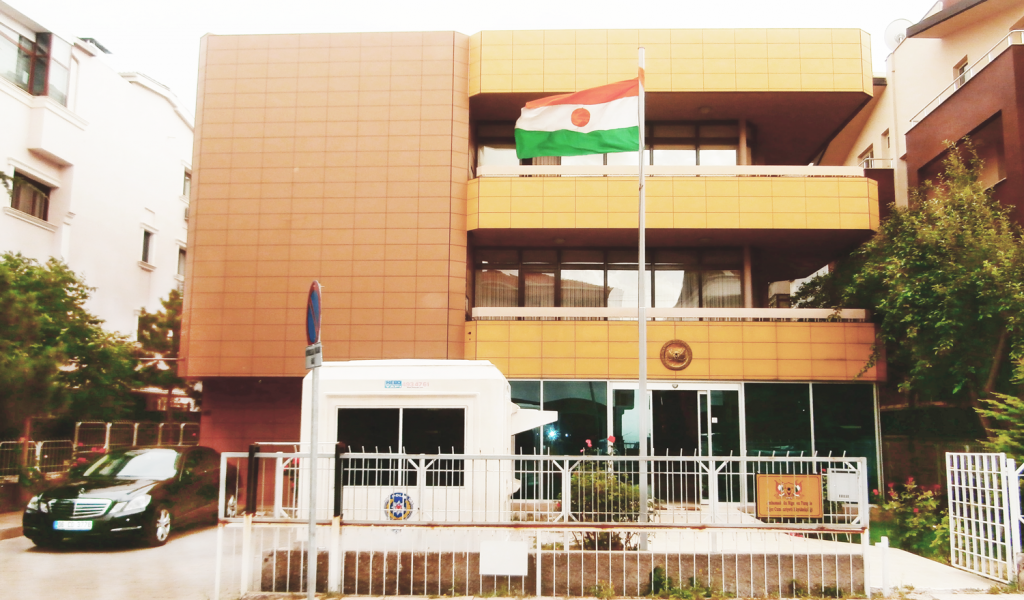
Embassy in Ankara

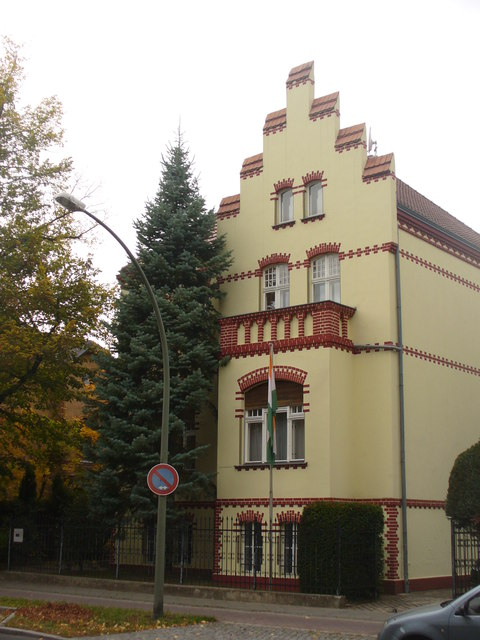
Embassy in Berlin

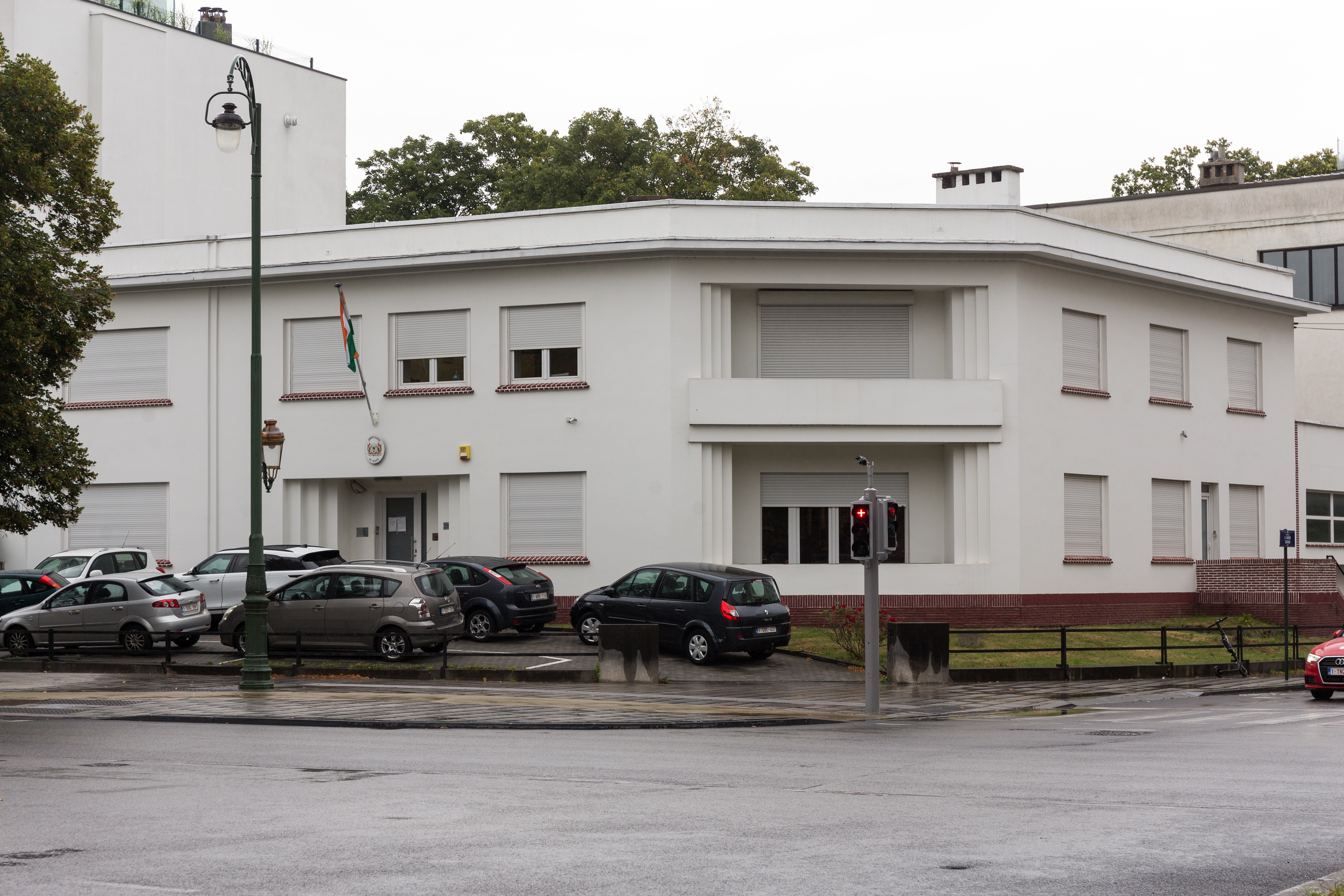
Embassy in Brussels

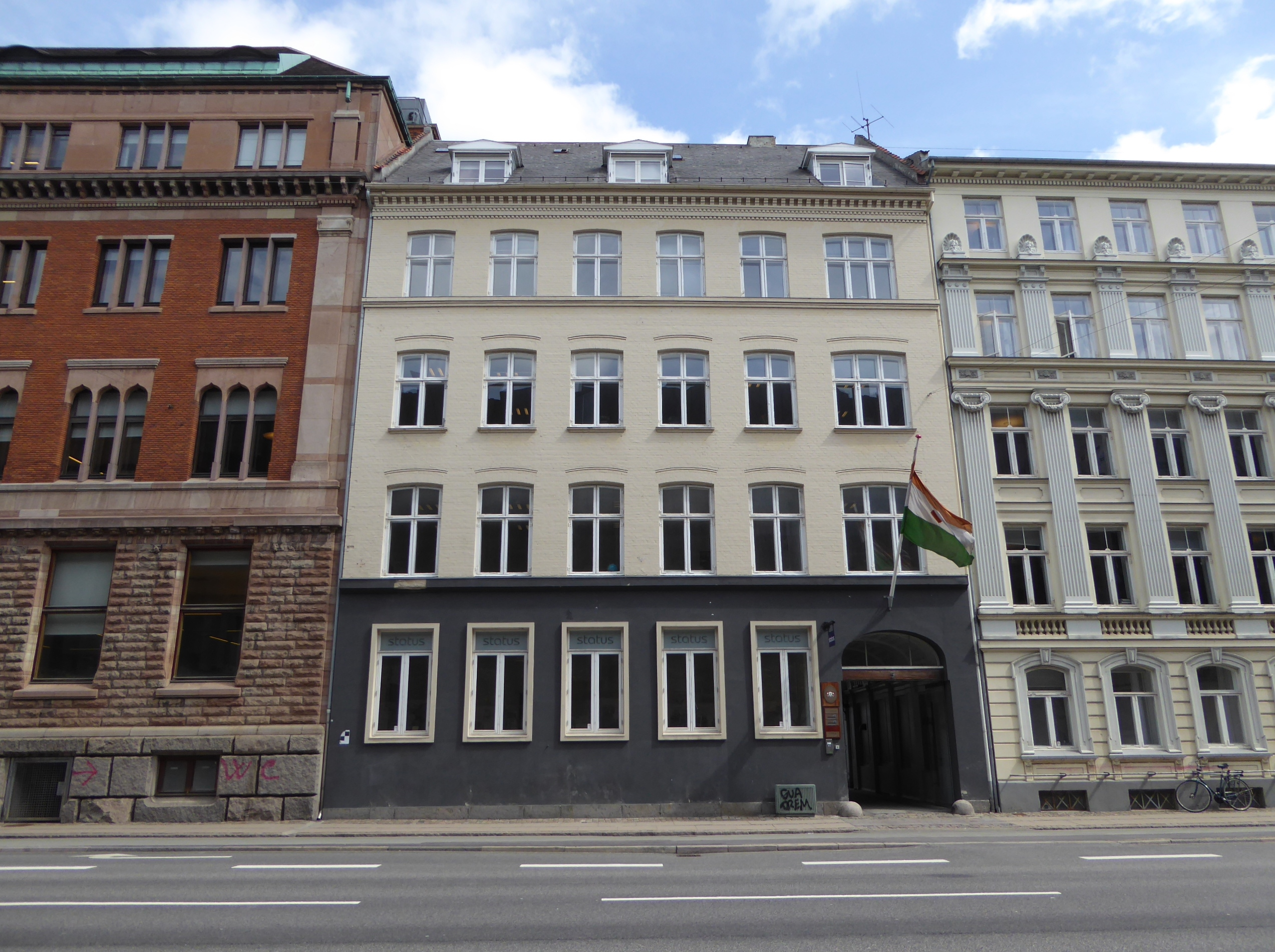
Embassy in Copenhagen

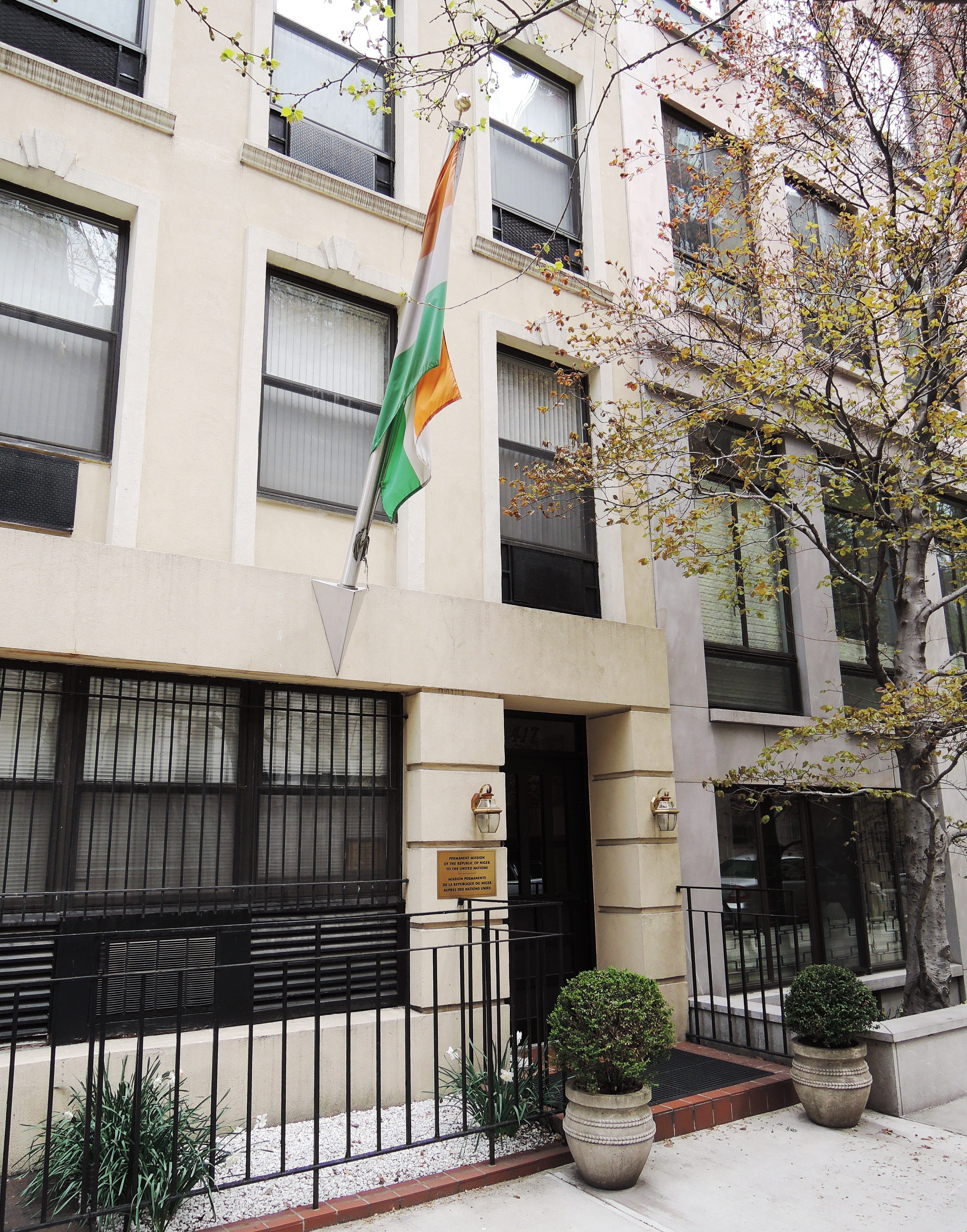
Permanent Mission to the U.N. in New York City

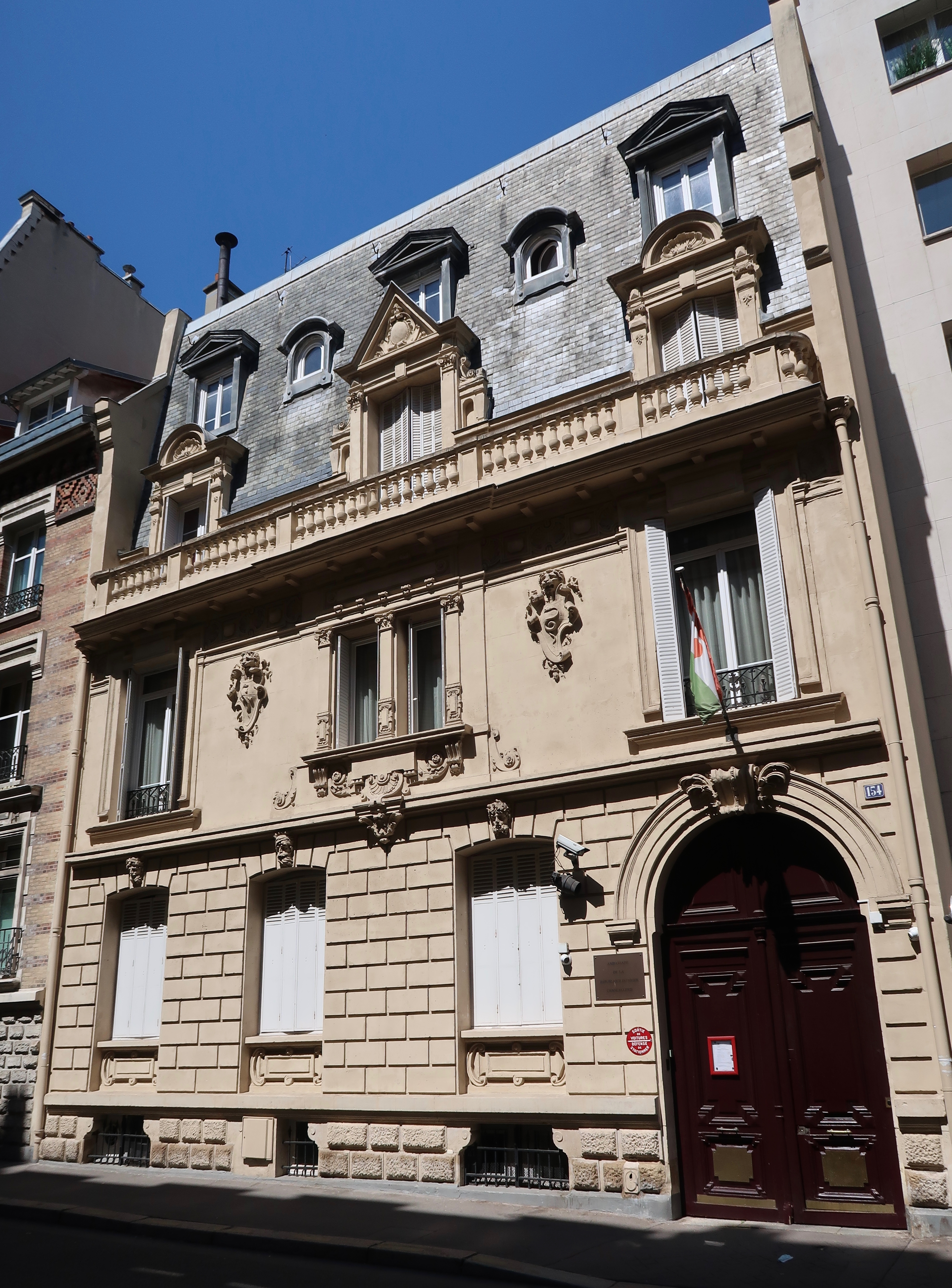
Embassy in Paris

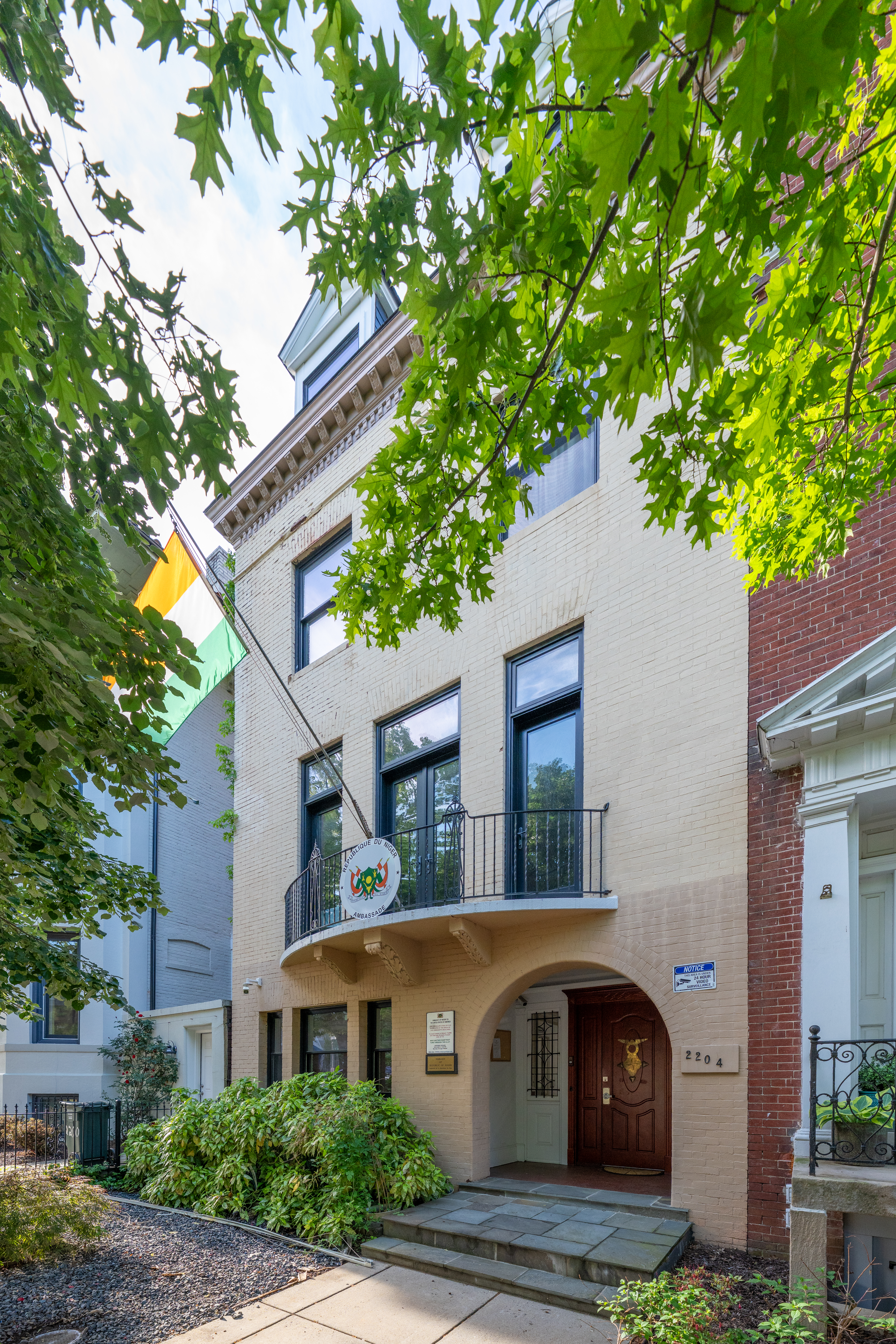
Embassy in Washington, D.C.

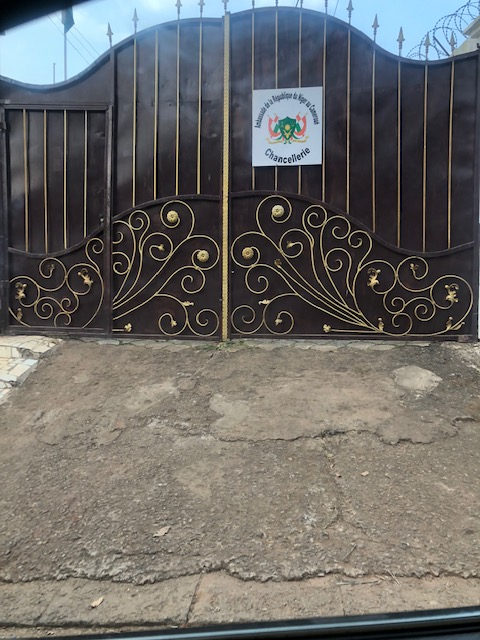
Embassy in Yaoundé

== See also ==
- Foreign relations of Niger
- List of diplomatic missions in Niger
- Visa policy of Niger
