= Cinema of Mozambique =

Filmmaking in Mozambique

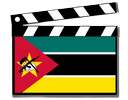

The cinema of Mozambique (Portuguese: Cinema de Moçambique) refers to the films and the film industry of Mozambique, which creates films in Portuguese (see List of Mozambican films). Furthermore, some foreign films have been produced about Mozambique or were shot there, such as Sidney Pollack's 2005 The Interpreter, Edward Zwick's 2006 Blood Diamond, and Teresa Prata's 2007 Sleepwalking Land (Terra Sonambula), an adaptation of the novel by Mozambican author Mia Couto.

== History ==
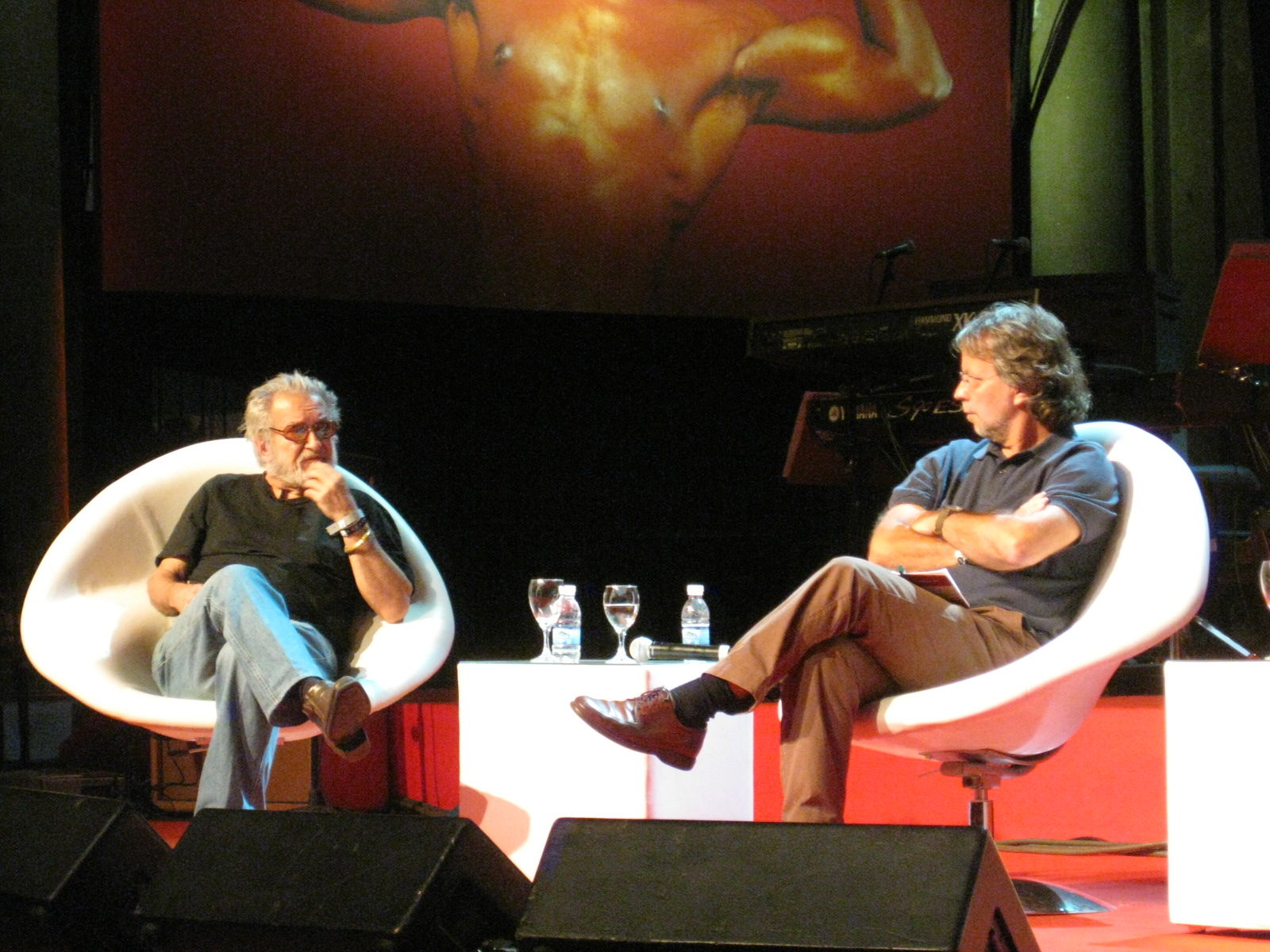
Mozambican filmmaker Ruy Guerra and writer Mia Couto at the Back2Black festival in Rio de Janeiro, 2010.

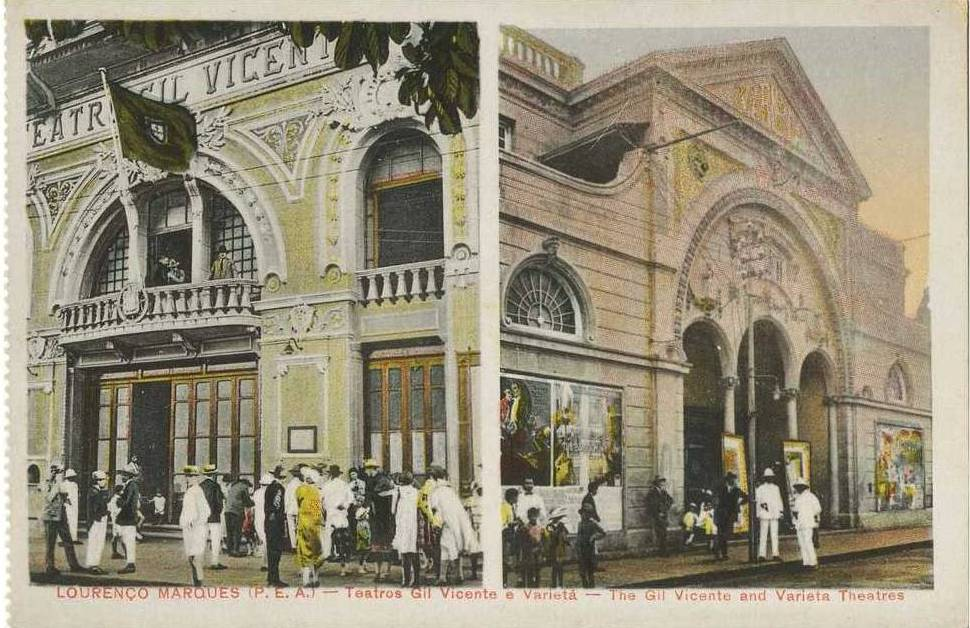
Cinemas Teatros Gil Vicente and Varietá in then Lourenço Marques (about 1920).

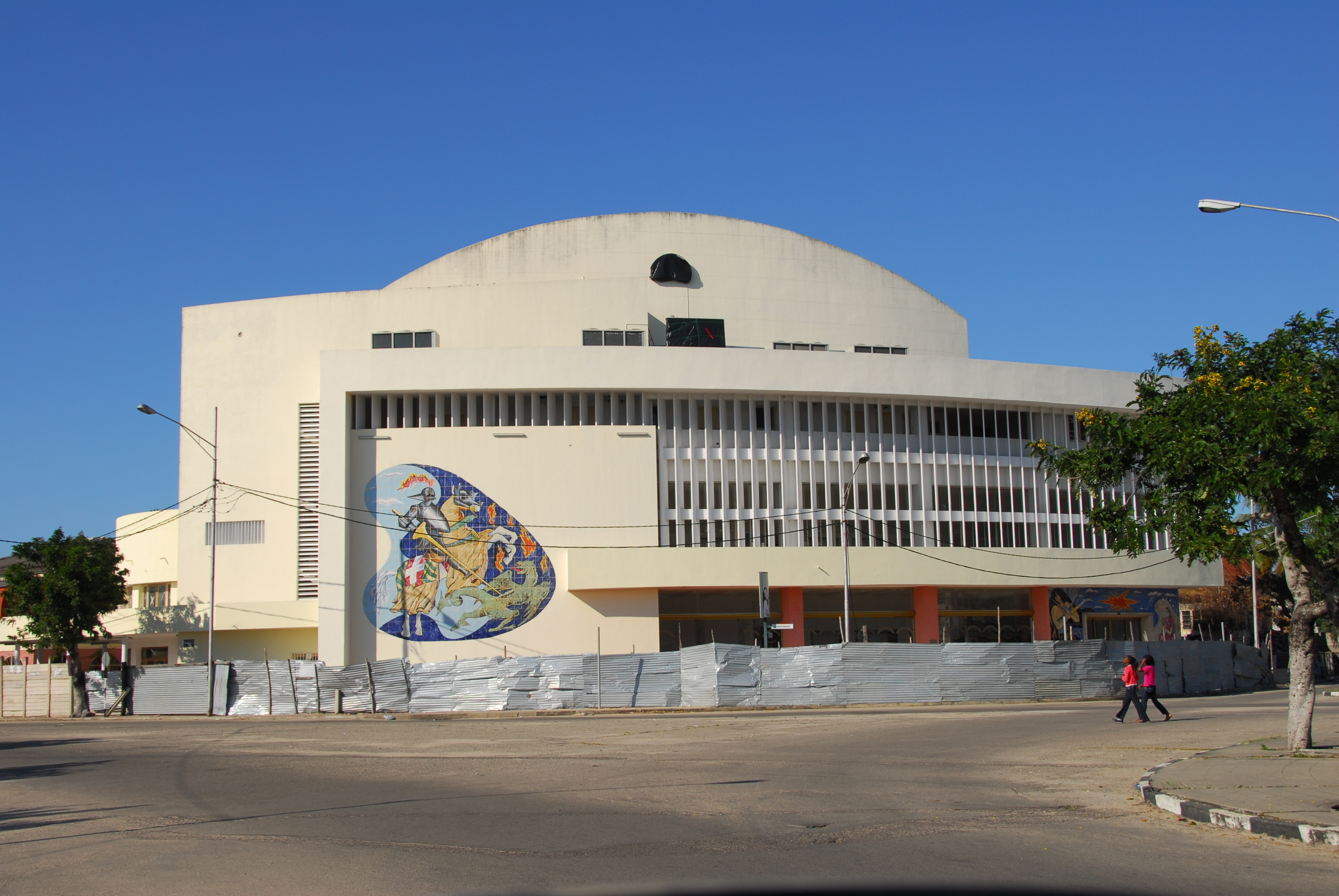
Cinema São Jorge in Beira (2011).

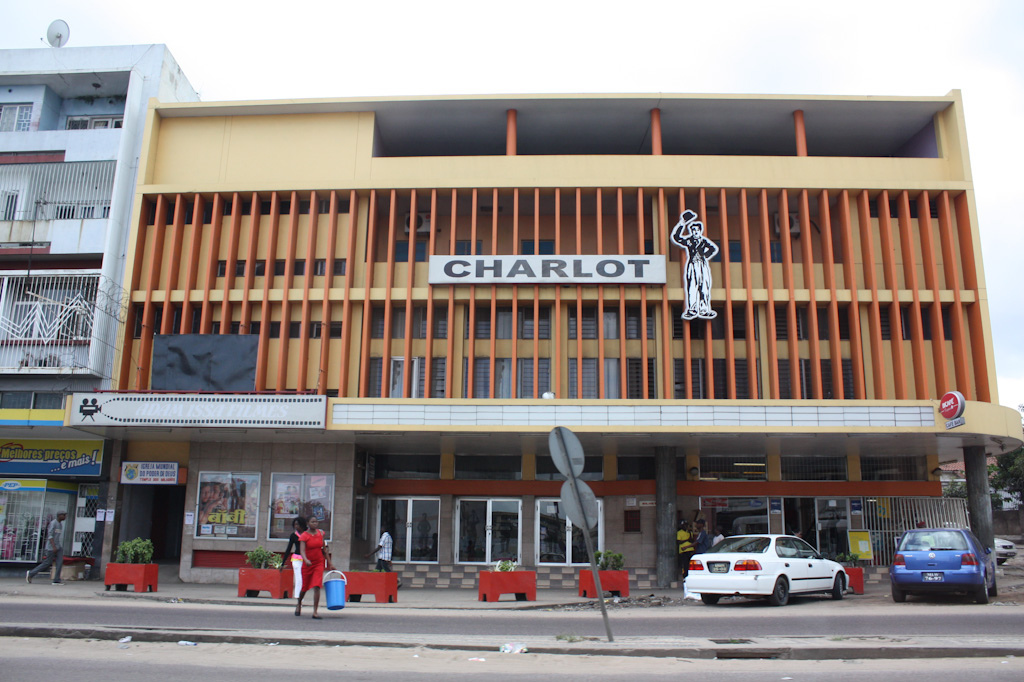
Cinema Charlot in Maputo (2009).

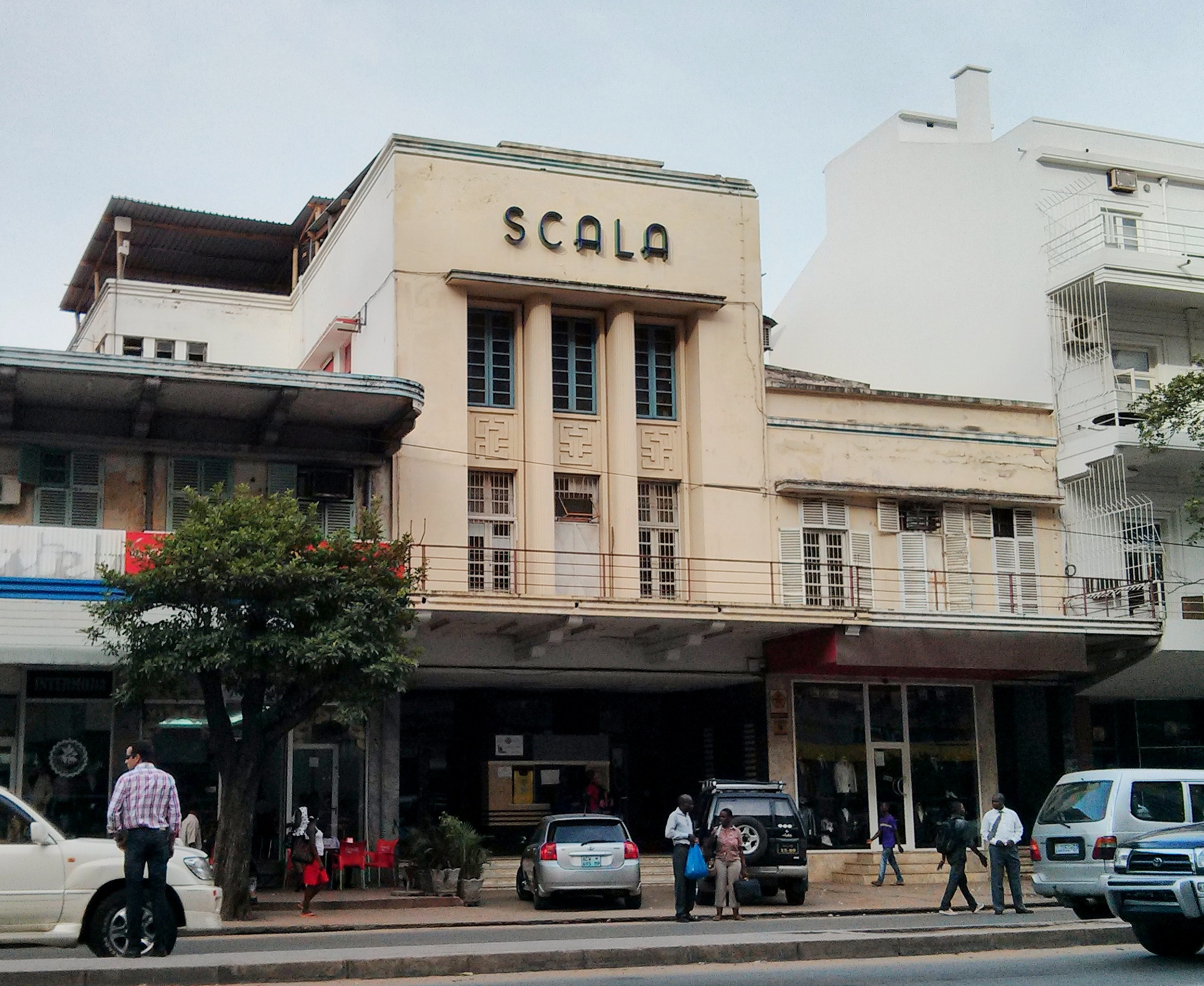
Cinema Scala (2014), one of the venues of the Dockanema film festivals in Maputo.

After the independence of Mozambique on June 25, 1975, the new marxist regime of the FRELIMO party invested in cinematic film production to show its own vision. It invited established European film directors like French Jean Godard (1930–2022) and Jean Rouch (1917–2022) to work on film and video projects in Mozambique in the years 1977-1998: Godard to research video for television and Rouch for a Super 8 film project teaching at the Communications Department of Eduardo Mondlane University, while the Portuguese-Brazilian film director Ruy Guerra (born in Maputo, 1931) worked at the Maputo Instituto Nacional de Cinema (INC) founded by FRELIMO in 1976. For instance Brazilian-Mozambican director Licínio Azevedo worked with Godard and Guerra in Maputo, or at least felt the influence of Godard and Rouch. In 2003 the Portuguese film maker Margarida Cardoso directed the documentary Kuxa Kanema: The Birth of Cinema detailing the founding of the National Institute of Cinema.

== Mozambican film directors ==
Well-known Mozambican film directors include Fátima Albuquerque, Licínio Azevedo, José Cardoso (born 1939), Chico Carneiro, Sol de Carvalho (born 1953 in Beira, Mozambique), Yara Costa, Mickey Fonseca, Victor Lopes, Rogério Manjate, Orlando Mesquita Lima (born 1962 in Nampula), Isabel Noronha, Pedro Pimenta (born 1955), Camilo de Sousa, and Lara Sousa. British film maker Karen Boswall worked in Mozambique between 1993 and 2007.

== Popular Mozambican films ==
In 2016, according to the Internet Movie Database the most popular Mozambican films were the following:

Year	Film	Genre	Director	Starring	Duration
1977	25	Documentary on Mozambique's independence and President Samora Machel's revolutionary government.	Celso Luccas, José Celso Martinez Corrêa	Samora Machel	120 m
1998	Nelio's Story / Comédia Infantil	Drama feature, based on Henning Mankell's 1995 novel Comédia infantil. Nelio, a young boy wounded in the Mozambican civil war, relates how he survived.	Solveig Nordlund	Evaristo Abreu, Adelino Branquinho, Augusto Cabral	93 m
2003	Disobedience / Desobediência	Drama feature. Rosa is accused of having caused the suicide of her husband.	Licínio Azevedo	Rosa Castigo, Tomás Sodzai	92 m
2007	Another Man's Garden / O Jardim do Outro Homem	Drama feature. Medical student Sofia finds that her professor wants more from her than just hard work.	Sol de Carvalho	Evaristo Abreu, Timóteo Maposse, Maria Amélia Pangane	80 m
2012	Virgin Margarida / Virgem Margarida	Drama feature. By mistake Margarida, a sixteen-year-old girl from the countryside, was arrested in a 1975 Maputo sweep of all the prostitutes.	Licínio Azevedo	Iva Mugalela, Hermelinda Cimela, Sumeia Maculuva	90 m
2014	Yvone Kane	Drama feature. Rita returns to her childhood's Africa to investigate the death of Yvone Kane, a former political activist and guerrilla fighter.	Margarida Cardoso	Beatriz Batarda, Irene Ravache, Samuel Malumbe	117 m
2016	The Train of Salt and Sugar / Comboio de Sal e Açúcar	Adventure feature. In the Mozambican civil war, a train with passengers hoping to trade salt for sugar travels 500 miles through RENAMO guerrilla-held territory.	Licínio Azevedo	Thiago Justino, Absalão Maciel, Matamba Joaquim	93 m

== Literature ==
- Convents, Guido (2009). Een andere kijk op cinema : film en audiovisuele cultuur in Mozambique / Deel I. Filmcultuur in koloniaal Mozambique (1896–1975) [Another look at cinema : film and audiovisual culture in Mozambique / Part I. Film culture in colonial Mozambique (1896–1975)]. Cinemagie. Driemaandelijks filmtijdschrift, jrg. 48 (zomer 2009) 267 (in Dutch). [Laken] (Belgium): Vzw Filmmagie. OCLC 793579548.
- Convents, Guido (2010). Een andere kijk op cinema : film en audiovisuele cultuur in Mozambique / Deel II. Filmcultuur in het onafhankelijke Mozambique (1975–2010) [Another look at cinema : film and audiovisual culture in Mozambique / Part II. Film culture in the independent Mozambique (1975–2010)]. Cinemagie. Driemaandelijks filmtijdschrift, jrg. 49 (zomer 2010) 271 (in Dutch). [Laken] (Belgium): Vzw Filmmagie. OCLC 793579588.
- De Medeiros, Paulo; Apa, Livia, eds. (2021). Contemporary Lusophone African Film : transnational communities and alternative modernities. London and New York: Routledge Taylor & Francis Group. ISBN 9780367134976. OCLC 1176322750.
- Gray, Ros (2020). Cinemas of the Mozambican revolution : anti-colonialism, independence and internationalism in filmmaking, 1968-1991. Woodbridge, Suffolk: James Currey. doi:10.2307/j.ctvktrx4b. ISBN 9781847012371. JSTOR j.ctvktrx4b. OCLC 1140135081. Full text PDFs online at www.cambridge.org, consulted on April 18, 2024.

== See also ==
- Category:Cinema of Mozambique
- Category:Mozambican film directors
- List of Mozambican films
- List of Portuguese films
