= Grand Bazaar =

Grand Bazaar or Great Bazaar may refer to:

- Grand Bazaar, Isfahan, located in Iran
- Grand Bazaar, Istanbul, located in Turkey
- Grand Bazaar, Tehran, located in Iran
- Grand Bazaar, Ürümqi, located in China
- Harvest Moon DS: Grand Bazaar, a 2008 simulation role-playing video game for the Nintendo DS
- The Great Bazaar (album), a 2015 album by the Israeli progressive metal band Subterranean Masquerade
- The Great Bazaar, a 2006 Mozambican drama film
