= O Tempo (disambiguation) =

O Tempo, Portuguese for 'the time', is a Brazilian newspaper. O Tempo may also refer to:

- O Tempo, an album by Brazilian band Oficina G3
- O Tempo dos Leopardos, the first Mozambican feature film
- O Tempo É Agora, a 2018 album by Anavitória
- O Tempo e o Vento, a trilogy of novels by Erico Verissimo
  - Time and the Wind, a 2013 film based on the trilogy
- O Tempo Não Para, a Brazilian telenovela
- "O Tempo não Pára" (song), a 1988 song by Cazuza
  - Cazuza: O Tempo Não Pára, a 2004 biopic about Cazuza
