= Night Lodgers =

2007 film by Licínio Azevedo

- Directed by: Licínio Azevedo
- Written by: Licínio Azevedo
- Produced by: Ebano Multimedia
- Cinematography: Karl de Sousa
- Edited by: Orlando Mesquita
- Music by: Chico António
- Distributed by: Marfilmes
- Release date: 2007
- Running time: 53 minutes
- Country: Mozambique
- Languages: Portuguese, Macua and Sena

Night Lodgers (Portuguese: Hóspedes da Noite) is a 2007 documentary directed by Licínio Azevedo about squatters living in the former Grande Hotel Beira in Mozambique.

== Festivals ==
- 13º Festival Internacional de Documentários, Brazil (2008)
- Afrika Camera, Poland
- Africa in the Picture, The Netherlands
- DokLeipzig, Germany
- Montreal Film Festival, Canada
- Torino Film Festival, Italian

== Awards ==
- Gold Fipa at FIPA - International Festival of Audiovisual Programs, France (2008)
- Best documentary at Festival Africa Taille XL, Belgium (2009)
- Closing film of Input Festival, South Africa

== See also ==
- Licínio Azevedo
