= Camilo de Sousa =

Mozambican film director (born 1953)

Camila de Sousa
- Born: 29 May 1953 (age 72); Lourenço Marques, Mozambique
- Occupation: film-maker

Camilo de Sousa (born 29 May 1953) is a film-maker from Mozambique, and has participated in hundreds of cinematographic productions, variously as producer, director, or first assistant. He is particularly noted for co-directing the feature film O Tempo dos Leopardos.

== Biography ==
Camilo de Sousa was born and educated in the capital of Mozambique, Lourenço Marques (now known as Maputo). From 1968 he developed an interest in photography, and soon became a photojournalist for the local newspaper O Jornal. But in 1972 he fled to Belgium as a refugee through the UNHCR.

In 1973 he returned to Africa, travelling to Tanzania and joining the Mozambique Liberation Front to fight for Mozambique's independence. After Mozambique was declared independent in 1975, de Sousa worked on several social and communication projects in the Province of Cabo Delgado, creating the first Mozambican network of information correspondents and moving a mobile cinema around all districts and localities of this province.

Mozambique's Instituto Nacional de Cinema (National Film Institute) had been founded in 1976, and de Sousa joined it in 1980, working there until 1991 as a director, editor, production director, producer and finally General Director of Production. He appears in this capacity in Margarida Cardoso's 2003 history of the institute, Kuxa Kanema: The Birth of Cinema, alongside his long-time friends and collaborators Isabel Noronha and Licínio Azevedo.

In 1992, with other professionals of cinema and communication, he created Mozambique's first independent cooperative for communication and production of images, the Coopimagem. In 2001, he joined Ebano Multimédia, where he has been developing the activity of producer and director. In 2003, de Sousa was a founding member and vice-president of the Mozambican filmmakers association.

== Filmography ==
Films which de Sousa directed include:

- 1980 – Ofensiva (documentary)
- 1981 – Ibo, o sangue do silêncio ('Ibo, the blood of silence'; eleven-minute documentary). In the north of the country, the Island of Ibo was used as the jail where the Portuguese political police tortured Mozambique nationalists without remorse. This documentary reflects that jail, the consequences of colonization and the Resistance.
- 1983 – Um dia às 7.30 horas (documentary)
- 1985 – O Tempo dos Leopardos (feature-film)
- 1987 – Não Mataram o Sonho de Patrício (with Ismael Vuvo. Curta-metragem. Documentary)
- 2003 – Ondas comunitárias. (documentary, 52 min.)
- 2006 – Junod (documentary)
- 2009 – Fronteiras de amor e ódio (documentary, 33 min.)
- 2014 – Na dobra da capulana (with Isabel Noronha. Documentary.)
- 2019 – Sonhámos Um País (with Isabel Noronha. Documentary.)

Films which de Sousa produced or on which he was a major collaborator include:

- 1987 – O vento sopra do norte (director: José Cardoso).
- 2005 – Sonhos Guardados (director: Isabel Noronha. Docu-drama, Mozambique Melhor)
- 2005 – The Demining Camp (director: Licínio Azevedo. Documentary)I
- 2006 – O Grande Bazar (director: Licinio Azevedo. Fiction, Mozambique)
- 2007 – Caminhos do Ser (director: Isabel Noronha. Documentary, 12 min.)
- 2007 – Delfina-mulher-menina (director: Isabel Noronha. Documentary, 23 min.)
- 2007 – Hóspedes da Noite (director: Licinio Azevedo. Docu-drama, Mozambique)
- 2007 – Ngwenya, o crocodilo (director: Isabel Noronha. Docu-drama, Mozambique)
- 2008 – Trilogia das Novas Famílias (director: Isabel Noronha. Docu-drama Mozambique)
- 2008 – Mãe dos Netos (realizadoras: Isabel Noronha e Vivian Altman. Animation, Mozambique)
