= Fátima Albuquerque =

Mozambican journalist

Fatima Albuquerque
- Born: Mozambique
- Occupation(s): Filmmaker, journalist

Fátima Albuquerque is a journalist and documentary filmmaker from Mozambique.

== Career ==
She was one of the first Mozambican women to direct films in the 1980s. Her documentaries demonstrate the broad range of documentary filmmaking in Mozambique.

After working on news items for Kuxa Kanema, Albuquerque made her first documentary, on street children in Mozambique.

== Films ==
- Lo ABC da nova vida [ABC of the new life], 1985
- As nossas flores [Our flowers], 1986
- Le Son c'est la vie [The sound is life], 1987
- Entre a dor e esperanca [Between pain and hope], 1987
- No meu pais existe uma guerra [In my country there is a war], 1989
