= The Demining Camp =

- Directed by: Licínio Azevedo
- Produced by: Licínio Azevedo, Camilo de Sousa
- Music by: Chico António
- Distributed by: Marfilmes
- Release date: 2005
- Running time: 60 minutes
- Country: Mozambique
- Languages: Portuguese, Xangana

The Demining Camp is a 2005 documentary directed by Licínio Azevedo. It presents the problems related to land mines left after the Mozambique Civil War and the resulting demining operations.

== Festivals ==
- Festival de Cinema de Países de Língua Portuguesa, Brazil (2005)
- IDFA - International Documentary Film Festival Amsterdam, the Netherlands (2005)

== Awards ==
- Best documentary at the 3rd WECC - World Environmental Education Congress, Italy (2005)
- 2nd prize "Windows on the World" at the Festival di Cinema Africano, Asia e America Latina, Italy (2005)
- Best documentary of Cinemambiente, Italy (2005)
