= Ranka Velimirović =

Serbian film producer (1940–2020)

- Born: 20 June 1940; Podgorica, Kingdom of Yugoslavia
- Died: 5 March 2020 (aged 79); Belgrade, Serbia
- Occupation(s): Film producer and director
- Spouse: Zdravko Velimirović
- Children: Milica Velimirović; Mladen Velimirović
- Website: www.weblibra.com

Ranka Velimirović (Serbian Cyrillic: Ранка Велимировић; 20 June 1940 – 5 March 2020) was a film producer and film director. She was the wife of the prominent Yugoslav film director Zdravko Velimirović.

== Career and life ==
She was born on 20 June 1940 in Podgorica, Kingdom of Yugoslavia. On completion of Law studies, University of Belgrade 1963, she remained in Belgrade and married the film director Zdravko Velimirović. After her graduation in 1963, she continued living in Belgrade working in the film and TV industry with occasional international visits and stays on professional basis. During her long career Ranka worked on great film and cultural projects in former Yugoslavia, Serbia and abroad. During her career as a film producer she contributed to many large film projects that gained international publicity. In 1990 she founded her own production studio called "Libra Film" and produced many widely awarded documentary films. Ranka directed and produced two documentaries about her late husband Zdravko Velimirović reflecting on his life, career and personal views.

She died in Belgrade, Serbia, on 5 March 2020. She was buried in the Alley of Distinguished Citizens in the New Cemetery in Belgrade on 11 March 2020.

== Filmography ==
=== Director ===
==== Documentaries ====
- Zdravko Velimirović – Život stvaraoca (Life of the art creator – Zdravko Velimirovic) (2006)
- Zdravko Velimirović – Lični stav (Personal view) (2015)
- Vodena ogledala (Water mirror)
- Cvetnik Jadovnik
- Stari Crnogorci govore (Old Montenegrins speak)
- Besmrtni poručnik u smrt sa osmijehom (The immortal Lieutenant in death with a smile)
- Planina, drvo, voda (Mountain, wood, water)
- Carostavni darovi Nemanjića (Gifts of Nemanjic Dynasty)
- Slovo ljubve (Word of love)
- Srebrna planina Rudnik (Silver mountain Rudnik)
- Studeničke svetinje u Srbiji (Sacred places of the Monastery Studenica in Serbia)
- Kanjon reke Jerme sa okolinom (Canyon of river Jerma and surroundings)

=== Producer ===
- Povratak na Medun (Return to Medun)
- Rijeka Zeta, Zeta zemlja (River Zeta, Zeta land)
- Rijeka Zeta, majka i kolijevka (Zeta, mother and cradle)
- Uzvišenje (Exaltation)
- Naši dragi gosti (Our dear guests)
- Piva
- Put za Pivu (Journey to Piva)
- Lovćen vidokrug (Lovcen horizons)
- Kapa Lovćenska (The cap of Lovcen)
- Njegoš u Boki (Njegos in the bay of Kotor)
- Od zlata jabuka (The golden apple)
- Na svetim vodama Lima (The holy water of river Lim)
- San o ljepoti (Dream about beauty)
- Kotor, biserna školjka Jadrana (Kotor, pearl of the Adriatic)
- Vodena ogledala (Water mirror)
- Darovi domu svetih ratnika (Gifts to the home of the sacred warriors)
- Cvetnik Jadovnik
- Zdravko Velimirović – Život stvaraoca (Life of the art creator – Zdravko Velimirovic) (2006)
- Zdravko Velimirović – Lični stav (Zdravko Velimirovic – Personal view) (2015)
- Stari Crnogorci govore (Old Montenegrins speak)
- Prepoznavanje (Uncovering)
- Besmrtni poručnik u smrt sa osmijehom (The immortal Lieutenant in death with a smile)
- Planina, drvo, voda (Mountain, wood, water)
- Carostavni darovi Nemanjića (Gifts of Nemanjic Dynasty)
- Magične vode (Magic water)
- Dodir neba, Stara planina (Touch the sky, The Old Mountain)
- Slovo ljubve (Word of love)
- Inspiracija Stara planina (Inspiration Old Mountain)
- Srebrna planina Rudnik (Silver mountain Rudnik)
- Dodir prirode, planina Rudnik (A touch of nature, mount Rudnik)
- Studeničke svetinje u Srbiji (Sacred places of the Monastery Studenica in Serbia)
- Golija skriveni biser (Golia hidden pearl)
- Planina Golija, impresija prirode (Mount Golia nature's impression)
- Zagarač, selo mojih predaka (Zagarac, village of my ancestors)
- Kanjon reke Jerme sa okolinom (Canyon of river Jerma and surroundings)
- Voleci Amorgos (Loving Amorgos)

== Other credits ==
Ranka worked as script supervisor on the following films:

Year	Film	Original title
1965	Certified: No Mines	Проверено - мин нет, Provereno nema mina
1968	Mount of Lament	Lelejska gora
1974	The Dervish and Death	Derviš i smrt
1975	The Peaks of Zelengora	Vrhovi Zelengore
1978	The Battle for the Southern Railway	Dvoboj za južnu prugu
1981	Dorotej	Dorotej
1985	O Tempo dos Leopardos	port. O Tempo dos Leopardos; serb. Vreme leoparda
1989	The Fall of Rock and Roll	Kako je propao rokenrol
