= A mãe dos netos =

- Directed by: Isabel Noronha, Vivan Altman
- Produced by: Ebano Multimedia
- Cinematography: Karl Sousa
- Edited by: Orlando Mesquita
- Music by: Gabriel Mondlane
- Release date: 2008
- Running time: 6'
- Country: Mozambique

A mãe dos netos is a 2008 Spanish film.

== Synopsis ==
A Mãe Dos Netos (The Grandchildren's Mother) is a story about AIDS in Mozambique and how it inexorably tears families apart, causing the parents’ death and leaving the elderly to care for the children. A combination of animation and documentary, this film narrates the story of Granny Elisa, whose son and eight wives died, leaving her to care for 14 children.
