= Isabel Noronha =

Mozambican film director

- Born: 1964 (age 60–61); Lourenço Marques (Maputo), Mozambique
- Occupation(s): Filmmaker, psychologist
- Awards: Cineposible Film Festival Creative Woman award, 2009

Isabel Helena Vieira Cordato de Noronha (born March 18, 1964) is a film director from Mozambique.

== Biography ==
Noronha was born in 1964 in Lourenço Marques (now Maputo), in Mozambique, during the Portuguese colonial period. Her father was a doctor, who was born in Goa when it was under Portuguese rule, which lasted until 1961, and her mother is from Mozambique.

In 1984, at the age of twenty, Noronha began her film career at the National Cinema Institute, where she worked as a production assistant, assistant director, continuity editor, production director and finally as a director, learning the craft with other Mozambican filmmakers and technicians, in the practice of the weekly 10-minute newsreel Kuxa Kanema: The Birth of Cinema (the government's practice of presenting news in film reels so it could be distributed throughout the very poor country, where people didn't have televisions and where there were no movie theaters). Here she created her first two documentary films, Hosi Katekisa Moçambique and Manjacaze. The mid-1980s are considered a seminal time in the Mozambique film industry, and one of the flourishing periods of cinema in southern Africa.

Around this time, she was part of a group of budding filmmakers who made O Tempo dos Leopardos (Time of the Leopards), which is considered to be the first feature film made in Mozambique.

In 1986, the government stopped funding the National Cinema Institute, and many filmmakers found themselves unemployed. Noronha started working as an independent filmmaker, and was one of the founders of the first video cooperative of the Mozambique directors guild, Coopimagem. In 1991, she created Así na Cidade (Once upon a time in the city), a documentary film about child-soldier war refugees who sell newspapers in Maputo. This same year she gave birth to her daughter, and decided to realize her dream of studying psychology at the Polytechnic University in Maputo. She finished her bachelor's degree in clinical psychology in 2002, and then went on to study psychoanalysis, social psychology and communications. In 2007 she completed her master's degree in mental health and social work at Leon University in Spain.

In 2003, Noronha began combining her work as a psychotherapist with her film work. With the help of a grant from the Amocine movie fund, she shot the documentary film Sonhos Guardados (Guarded Dreams). In 2007 she made her first full-length film, Ngwenya, o crocodilo (Ngwenya the Crocodile), about the Mozambican artist, Malangatana Valente Ngwenya.

One of her most noted works is the New Family Trilogy, Trilogia das Novas Famílias, a trilogy of documentary films about a new family model that arose in Mozambique, made up of children orphaned as a result of the AIDS epidemic.

== Awards ==
In 2009, Noronha won the Cineposible Film Festival Creative Woman award for her film Mãe dos Netos (Mother of the Grandchildren). That same year, she won the Janela para o Mundo (window to the world) award for the best documentary film for Ngwenya, o crocodilo, at the Africa, Asia and Latin American Film Festival in Milan.

== Selected filmography ==
- 1987: Manjacaze
- 1987: Hosi Katekissa Moçambique
- 1992: Assim na Cidade
- 1995: Mães da Terra
- 2004: Sonhos Guardados
- 2007: Ngwenya, o Crocodilo
- 2008: Trilogia das Novas Famílias
- 2008: Mãe dos Netos
- 2010: Espelho Meu (Espejito)
- 2019: Sonhámos Um País (with Camilo de Sousa)

== See also ==
- List of female film and television directors
