= The Ship and the Sea =

2019 documentary film

- Directed by: Lara Sousa; Everlane Moraes
- Written by: Lara Sousa; Everlane Moraes
- Produced by: Lara Sousa; Matheus Mello; Emerson Dindo
- Starring: Lara Sousa; Everlane Moraes
- Cinematography: Lara Sousa; Everlane Moraes
- Production companies: Pàttàki Audiovisual; Produtora Portátil; Kulunga Filmes
- Release date: 2019
- Running time: 90 minutes
- Countries: Mozambique; Brazil
- Language: Portuguese

The Ship and the Sea (Portuguese: O Navio e o Mar) is a documentary film written and directed by Lara Sousa, and Everlane Moraes and produced by Lara Sousa, Everlane Moraes, Matheus Mello and Emerson Dindo.

== Production ==
The creative documentary film is to be shot and produced in Brazil and Mozambique by the production companies: Pàttàki Audiovisual, Produtora Portátil and Kulunga Filmes. The film output format is in Color, Digital/Digital 5.1, Dolby Stereo format. The production is still being developed.

== Plot/Synopsis ==
A decision was reached by Everlane and Lara from Brazil and Mozambique, respectively, who are both black filmmakers, to mirror by travelling to each other's country in a crisscross manner and then, looking at each other's films inquisitively to pick out the missing traits of their black identities on both sides in order to fill in the missing trait gaps.

== Reception ==
The film was selected at the 11th Durban International Film Festival (DIFF 2020) held between September 10 to 20, online, alongside about 30 other films as one of the Finance Forum Projects.

== Awards ==
The film won at the 2020 Durban FilmMart, the International Documentary Film Festival Amsterdam (IDFA) Award of The Netherlands.

After participating in various international markets, the film started receiving financial funding for its development. Yet in 2020, Everlane Moraes was the first black female Brazilian to be a grantee of the William Greaves Film Fund from Firelight Media with the Ship and the Sea.

In 2021, the film was also recipient of the Sundance Documentary Film Fund, for its development.
