= Veljko Mandić =

Montenegrin actor

- Born: 10 October 1924; Nikšić, Kingdom of Serbs, Croats and Slovenes
- Died: 19 November 1988 (aged 64); Nikšić, SFR Yugoslavia
- Occupation: Actor
- Years active: 1955–1988

Veljko Mandić (10 October 1924 – 19 November 1988) was a Montenegrin actor. He appeared in more than fifty films from 1955 to 1988.

== Selected filmography ==
Year	Title	Role
1987	Days to Remember	Alter Ivo
1984	Unseen Wonder	Zeljo's father
1982	The Marathon Family	Rajković's brother
1980	Petria's Wreath	Kamenče
1979	The Man to Destroy	Crnogorac (Montenegrin)
1976	The Peaks of Zelengora	Veljko
1975	The Day That Shook the World	?
1974	Death and the Dervish	Kara Zaim
