= Mladen Velimirović =

Yugoslav film maker

Mladen Velimirovic (Belgrade, Yugoslavia) is a film director, screenwriter, producer and photographer.

== Personal life ==
Mladen was raised in a known family of film makers. His father Zdravko Velimirović was a film director, university professor and Principal of Belgrade University, Faculty of Arts and Drama. His mother Ranka Velimirović is a film and television producer and ecologist.

== Filmography ==
- Exaltation
- Our dear guests
- Piva
- The Cap of Lovcen
- Njegos in the bay of Kotor
- The Golden Apple
- The holly water of river Lim
- Dream about Beauty
- Water mirror
- Gifts to the home of the sacred warriors
- Touch the sky – Old Mountain
- Magic Waters, documentary, 2008
- Inspiration - Old Mountain, documentary, 2010
- A touch of nature - Mountain Rudnik, documentary, 2011
- Monte Cattaro, documentary, prod. Libra film; Regent Films
- Golija, The Hidden Pearl, documentary, prod. Zastava film; Libra film, 2015
- Zagarach - Montenegro, 2016

== Awards ==
- Award for the best environmental film, International film festival Art-Paper, Pitesti, Romania, 2008, for the film: Magic Waters
- Award for the best environmental film, International festival of ecological tourism and film, Lecce, Italy, 2010, for the film: Inspiration - Old Mountain
- The Second Prize of the official film jury, Yperia International film festival, Amorgos, Greece, April 2011, for the film Inspiration - Old Mountain
- Grand Prix for the best environmental film, 47th Tourfilm International festival of ecological tourism and film, Lecce, Italy, May 2011, for the film: A touch of nature - Mountain Rudnik
- Award for the best environmental film with Special jury prize, 15th International film festival DocumentArt, Campulung Muscel, Romania, 2011, for the film: A touch of nature - Mountain Rudnik
- Award for the best environmental film, 14th International film festival Fiscalis, Solin, Croatia, October 2011, for the film: A touch of nature - Mountain Rudnik
- Award for the best environmental film, International film festival Riga tour, Riga, Latvia, 2012, for the film: Inspiration - Old Mountain
- Award for the best environmental film, International film festival Filmat, Warsaw, Poland, 2012, for the film: Inspiration - Old Mountain
- Grand Prix for the best environmental film, Tourfilm International festival of ecological tourism and film, Lecce, Italy, October 2012, for the film: Monte Cattaro
- Award for the environmental film, International film festival, Solin, Croatia, October 2012, for the film: Monte Cattaro
- The Third Prize, Yperia International film festival, Amorgos, Greece, May 2013, for the film: Monte Cattaro
- Award Zlatna buklija, Velika Plana, Serbia, 2014, for the film: Golija, The Hidden Pearl
- Award for the environmental film, International film festival Riga tour, Riga, Latvia, 2015, for the film: Golija, The Hidden Pearl

== Exhibitions ==
- 2012: London - Great Britain - in the year of the Olympics, Riga, Latvia, 2012
- 2012: London - Great Britain - in the year of the Olympics, London, UK, 2012
- 2012: London - Great Britain - in the year of the Olympics, Athens, Greece, 2012
- 2013: Boka Kotorska - Kotor - Crna Gora, Amorgos, Greece, May 2013
- 2016: Island of Amorgos and Amorgians, Amorgos, Greece, October 2016
