= Mabata Bata =

2017 Mozambique documentary drama film

- Directed by: Sol de Carvalho
- Written by: Sol de Carvalho; José Magro
- Based on: Novel O dia que explodiu Mabata Bata by Mia Couto
- Produced by: Sol de Carvalho; Rodrigo Areias; Ricardo Freitas
- Starring: Emílio Bila; Wilton Boene; Medianeira Massingue; Esperança Naiene
- Cinematography: Jorge Quintela
- Edited by: André Guiomar
- Music by: Pierre Dufloo
- Release date: 30 April 2017 (Mozambique)
- Running time: 74 min.
- Countries: Mozambique; Portugal
- Languages: Tsonga; Portuguese

Mabata Bata is a 2017 Mozambique feature drama film directed by Sol de Carvalho and co-produced by the director along with Rodrigo Areias and Ricardo Freitas for Bando à parte Promarte Films. The film is a magic-realist adaption from a short story by Mia Couto. The TV movie version was released on 30 April 2017 in Portugal and 1 May 2017 in Brazil. On 30 January 2019, the film was released at International Film Festival Rotterdam in Netherlands. The film was shot around the locations in Chibuto, Gaza and Mozambique.

== Plot ==
The plot is based on a short story by Mia Couto O Dia Em Que Explodiu Mabata Bata (The Day Mabata Bata Exploded). Azarias, a young orphaned shepherd has to tend the oxen flock of his uncle Raul, although he dreams of going to school. The most beautiful animal, Mabata Bata, is destined to pay the dowry of Raul's fiancée. However, the ox leaves the herd and steps on a mine left behind by fighters in the civil war. Afraid of his uncle's wrath, Azarias flees into the forest with the remaining animals and magical events occur. His grandmother and uncle set out to rescue him and convince him to return.

== Cast ==
- Emílio Bila as Azarias
- Filomena Remigio as Carolina
- Esperança Naiene as Irondina
- Medianeira Massingue as Lúcia
- Mário Mabjaia as Espírito
- Horácio Guiamba as Raul
- Wilton Boene as José
- Shcozo Ichiyama

== Awards and accolades ==
The film received positive reviews and won several awards at international film festivals.

- II Festival Atlantis Film Awards – Special Mention Award
- Panafrican Film and Television Festival of Ouagadougou (FESPACO) – Jorge Quintela, Best Photography of a Fiction Feature Film Award
- Pan–African Festival of Cinema and Television of Ouagadougou – André Guiomar, Best Editing Award
- Antonio Loja Neves Award from the Portuguese Federation of Film Clubs (FPCC) – Best Film Award
- Kazan International Festival of Muslim Cinema, Russia, 2019 – Dialogues of Cultures in the Islamic World Award
- New York City Independent Film Festival, 2019 – Best Fiction Film Award
- Luxor African Film Festival, 2019 – Radwan El-Kashef Award for Best Film on an African theme.
- Cabo Verde International Film Festival – Best Film Award
- 17th Angers African Film Festival – Young Jury Award for Best Film
- Langston Hughes African American Festival (LHAAFF), 2019 – Best Film Award
- Africa Movie Academy Awards, 2019 - Best Achievement in Soundtrack
