= Sol de Carvalho =

Mozambican cinema and TV director and producer maker

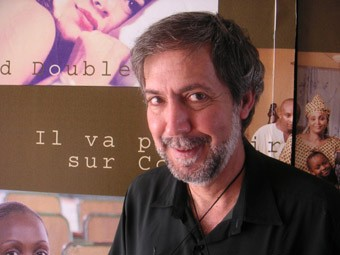
- Sol de Carvalho at the 2008 Cannes Film Festival
- Born: João Luís Sol de Carvalho; 1953 (age 72–73); Beira, Mozambique, Portuguese Mozambique (present-day Maputo, Mozambique)
- Citizenship: Mozambique
- Occupations: Film director; screenwriter; producer; journalist
- Years active: 1975–present
- Notable work: movies Another Man's Garden (2007), Impunidades Criminosas (2012), and Mabata Bata (2017).

Sol de Carvalho (João Luís Sol de Carvalho, born 1953) is a Mozambican film director and producer.

== Biography ==
He grew up in Inhambane and later attended in Lisbon the Escola de Cinema do Conservatório, forerunner of the Lisbon Theatre and Film School. When Mozambique became independent in 1975, he worked as director of the Serviço Nacional da Rádio Moçambique (Radio Mozambique). From 1979 he was a journalist for the Mozambican magazine Tempo with journalist, poet and writer Mia Couto and Albino Magaia. In 1986 he decided to dedicate himself entirely to audiovisual media (cinema and television) as a director and producer. Sol de Carvalho was one of the founders of the Mozambican production company Ébano, together with Pedro Pimenta and Licínio Azevedo), which he later left to start his own new company Promarte.

== Filmography ==
De Carvalho's films include:

Year	Film	Genre	Role	Duration (min)
1999	Muhipiti Alima	Drama short. Alima wants to go to school, but her husband is against it.	Director	34 m
2004	The Murmuring Coast / A Costa dos Murmúrios by Margarida Cardoso	Feature	Actor	120 m
2005	A Janela	Short	Director	
2006	Another Man's Garden / O Jardim do Outro Homem	Feature. A university student can be forced by her professor to extend certain favours.	Director, screenwriter, producer	80 m
2009	O Búzio	Short drama	Director, producer in Mozambique	9 m
2011	Impunidades Criminosas (translated title: Unpunished crimes)	Drama short. Sara reminisces about her life. She killed her violent husband Armando and his ghost tormented her at night. She then had to kill Paixão, Armando's gang leader, as well because he forced her to have sex with him.	Director, producer	35 m
2012	A Terra dos Nossos Avós	Documentary short	Producer	33 m
2015	Operação Angola - Fugir para Lutar by Diana Andringa (translated title: Operation Angola: fleeing to fight)	Documentary feature. Some 60 students from the Portuguese colonies, including Pedro Pires, Joaquim Chissano, Fernando José de França Dias Van-Dúnem and Pascoal Mocumbi flee Portugal to escape persecution.	Producer in Mozambique	116 m
2018	Pele de Luz (translated title: Skin of light)	Short drama documentary. Two albino sisters of Maputo survive attempted kidnapping and live in fear of the rampant belief in black magic.	Co-producer	19 m
2018	Mabata Bata	Drama feature, adaptation of Mia Couto's short story O dia em que explodiu Mabata Bata. An ox steps on a land mine from the civil war and its oxherd has to flee.	Director, co-producer	74 m
2018	Geração da Independência	Documentary feature	Director	58 m
2019	Monólogos com a História	Drama short	Director, screenwriter, producer	18 m
2021	Kutchinga	Drama feature. According to the Mozambican tradition called Kutchinga, a widow has to accept sexual relations with the husband's older brother to keep property in the family. A gigolo can be hired to do the job.	Researcher, screenwriter, co-producer, director	61 m
2022	O Ancoradouro do Tempo	Feature, adaptation of Mia Couto's book A varanda do frangipani. Police inspector Izidine investigates a murder in an old colonial fortress and old people's home. Everyone confesses.	Director, co-screenwriter with Mia Couto	105 m

== See also ==
- Cinema of Mozambique
