= The Peaks of Zelengora =

- Directed by: Zdravko Velimirović
- Screenplay by: Zdravko Velimirović; Mladen Oljača; Đurica Labović; Aleksandar Vukotić
- Produced by: Nikola Popović
- Starring: Sergei Bondarchuk; Bata Živojinović; Josephine Chaplin; Alain Noury; Veljko Mandić
- Cinematography: Nenad Jovičić
- Edited by: Katarina Stojanović
- Music by: Zoran Hristić
- Production companies: Filmski studio, Titograd; FRZ VZ; Centar FRZ; Jadran film; Zeta film; Kosova film; Udruženi jugoslovenski distributeri
- Release date: June 2, 1976
- Running time: 1 h 41 minutes
- Country: Yugoslavia
- Language: Serbo-Croatian

The Peaks of Zelengora (Serbian: Врхови Зеленгоре / Croatian: Vrhovi Zelengore) is a 1976 Yugoslav war drama directed by Zdravko Velimirović.

== Plot ==
During the 1943 Battle of Sutjeska, Yugoslav partisan troops must endure 24 hours of heavy attacks by German troops of the Prinz Eugen division, on the hill called Ljubin Grave.

== Cast ==
- Sergei Bondarchuk as Professor
- Bata Živojinović as Boro
- Josephine Chaplin as Milena
- Alain Noury as Milan
- Veljko Mandić as Veljko
- Ljiljana Dragutinović as Čarna
- Slobodan Dimitrijević as Andrija Šiler
- Danilo Lazović as Dačo
- Faruk Begoli as Rajko
- Branko Đurić as Rajko Đurović
- Voja Mirić as Sturmbannführer
- Božidar Pavićević Longa as Hauptsturmführer
- Miodrag Krstović as Radica
- Darinka Đurašković as Anđa
- Gordana Kosanović as Borka
- Peter Carsten as Oberst
- Rastislav Jović as Hans

== Credits ==
- Screenplay: Zdravko Velimirović, Mladen Oljača, Đurica Labović, Aleksandar Vukotić
- Director of photography: Zoran Jovičić
- Music: Zoran Hristić
- Film editor: Katarina Stojanović
- Sound recording: Duško Aleksić
- Boom operator: Milan Tričković
- Assistant directors: Krsto Petanjek, Đorđe Vujović
- Costumes: Ljiljana Dragović
- Makeup artist: Šuco Šarkić
- Camera operator: Stevan Lepetić
- Script supervisor: Ranka Velimirović
- Assistant to the director: Milorad Laković
- Assistant camera: Nikola Đurašković, Marko Živković
- Assistant editor: Peca Aleksić
- Set dresser: Asim Babić
- Gaffer: Boško Kovačević
- Special effects: Islam Ibračić, Vlatko Miličević
- Set construction: Lelo Adil
- Armourer: Stojan Mrba
- Wardrobe: Zvonimir Meštrović, Ramiza Kalamujić
- Props: Mirsad Huković
- Figurines: Vera Jovičić
- Unit menager: Simo Cvjetković
- Production menagers: Slobodan Roganović, Savo Popović, Maric Perić

== Rewards ==
- Golden Arena for Best Screenplay 1976: Zdravko Velimirović, Mladen Oljača, Đurica Labović and Aleksandar Vukotić.
- Golden Arena for Best Supporting Actor 1976: Veljko Mandić.

== Dedication ==
This film is dedicated to the defenders of Ljuba's grave during the fateful battle of Sutjeska.

== Special thanks ==
- Military consultant Maj. General Milan Vukotić. "The Production thanks the Yugoslavian People's Army for their collaboration during this film."

== See also ==
- Battle of Sutjeska
