= Trilogia das novas familias =

- Directed by: Isabel Noronha
- Produced by: Ebano Multimedia
- Cinematography: Karl Sousa
- Edited by: Orlando Mesquita
- Release date: 2008
- Running time: 45 minutes
- Country: Mozambique

Trilogia das novas familias is a 2008 documentary film.

== Synopsis ==
The film consists of three short documentary films that show the faces and give voices to children orphaned by AIDS. The intentions of the documentary are to focus attention on the dismemberment of families in Mozambique due to AIDS, because it is a harsh reality and too often ignored.
