= The Great Bazaar =

- Directed by: Licínio Azevedo
- Produced by: Ebano Multimedia
- Starring: Edmundo Mondlane; Chano Orlando; Chico António; Paito Tcheco; Manuel Adamo
- Edited by: Orlando Mesquita
- Music by: Chico António
- Distributed by: Marfilmes
- Release date: 2006
- Running time: 56 minutes
- Country: Mozambique
- Languages: Portuguese, Shangana

The Great Bazaar is a 2006 drama film written and directed by Licínio Azevedo. It is the story of two boys who meet in an African market.

== Festivals ==
- Fribourg Film Festival, Switzerland
- Children Film Festival, London
- Cinema Africa, Sweden
- Rassegna di Cinema Africano, Italy
- FESPACO - Panafrican Film and Television Festival of Ouagadougou, Burkina Faso
- Tampere Film Festival, Finland
- AfryKamera Festival, Poland
- Journées Cinématographiques de Carthage, Tunis
- Montréal Film Festival, Canada
- Vancouver International Film Festival, Canada

== Awards ==
- Best short film and Public Award at Festival Cinémas d'Afrique à Angers, France (2007)
- FIPA d'Argent at FIPA - Festival International of Audiovisual Programs, France (2006)
- Best Short Film at the 27th Durban International Film Festival, South Africa (2006)
- Best fiction film at CINEPORT, Brazil (2006)
- Best Video at XVI Balafon Film Festival, Italy (2006)
- Best Fiction at 33.ª Jornada Internacional de Cinema da Bahia, Brazil (2006)

== See also ==
- Licínio Azevedo
- ´O Cinema em Moçambique: Licínio Azevedo´
- 'Filme de Licínio de Azevedo ganha prata em Biarritz'
