= Lara Sousa =

Mozambican filmmaker

- Born: Mozambique
- Education: International School of Cinema and Television
- Occupations: Director, producer
- Known for: The Ship and the Sea (O Navio e O Mar) (2019); Kalunga (2019); Fin (End) (2018)

Lara Sousa, also Lara de Sousa, is a Mozambican filmmaker. She worked as a programmer of the DOCKANEMA Documentary Festival of Mozambique for several years and had been engaged in social and development projects, focusing her research on gender issues, human rights and others.

== Education ==
Sousa has a specialization degree in Documentary Direction, obtained from the International School of Cinema and Television (EICTV) of San Antonio de los Baños, Cuba. She also studied Anthropology at ISCTE, Portugal and UCM, Spain, specializing in Visual Anthropology.

== Career ==
In 2017, she wrote, directed and produced the Spanish documentary, La Finca del Miedo (The Farm of Fear), produced by IECTV, Cuba.

In 2018, she directed a documentary film, Fin (End), also released in Cuba.

The documentary, The Ship and the Sea (Portuguese: O Navio e o Mar), which she co-produced with Matheus Mello, and co-directed with Everlane Moraes, was selected alongside about 30 other films as a Finance Forum Projects at the 11th Durban International Film Festival (DIFF 2020) held between September 10 to 20, online. The film also won at the 2020 Durban FilmMart, the International Documentary Film Festival Amsterdam (IDFA) Award of The Netherlands.

She participated at the 2020 Indaba initiative selection, under the first category, "The 2020 participants with projects are producers", with the feature film project by Inadelso Costa titled, "Karigana".

She participated in the Colab NowNow exhibition organized by the British Council, partnering with Maputo Fast Forward festival of Mozambique and Fak’ugesi African Digital Innovation Festival of South Africa.

== Filmography ==
Year	Film	Role	Notes	Ref.
2020	The Ship and the Sea (O Navio e o Mar	Co-director, Co-producer	Documentary (Creative)	
2019	Kalunga	Director	Documentary, Short film	
2019	Machimbrao - El hombre nuevo	Director	Documentary (Creative)	
2018	Fin (End)	Director	Documentary (Creative)	
2017	La Finca del Miedo (The Farm of Fear)	Director, Producer, Writer	Documentary	
