= Virgin Margarida =

2012 Portuguese drama film

- Directed by: Licínio Azevedo
- Written by: Jacques Akchoti; Licínio Azevedo
- Produced by: Jacques Bidou; Pandora da Cunha Telles; Marianne Dumoulin; Pablo Iraola; Pedro Pimenta
- Starring: Sumeia Maculuva; Hermelinda Cimela; Iva Mugalela; Rosa Mario
- Cinematography: Mario Masini
- Edited by: Nadia Ben Rachid
- Music by: Moreira Chonguiça
- Production companies: Ebano Multimedia; Fonds Images Afrique du Ministère Français des Affaires Etranges; Instituto do Cinema e do Audiovisual; JBA; Radiotelevisão Portuguesa Ukbar Filmes
- Distributed by: Marfilmes; Trigon-film
- Release date: September 2012 (Toronto)
- Running time: 90 minutes
- Countries: Mozambique; France; Portugal
- Languages: French; Portuguese

Virgin Margarida (theatrically as Virgem Margarida) is a 2012 Portuguese drama film directed by Mozambique director Licínio Azevedo and co-produced by Jacques Bidou, Pandora da Cunha Telles, Marianne Dumoulin, Pablo Iraola and Pedro Pimenta. The film stars Sumeia Maculuva with Hermelinda Cimela, Iva Mugalela, and Rosa Mario in supporting roles. The film is about Margarida, a sixteen-year-old girl from the countryside who was taken mistakenly during 1975 Mozambique's rebirth to sweep all the prostitutes and bad habits from the streets of Maputo.

Virgin Margarida premiered at the 2012 Toronto International Film Festival. The film received critics positive acclaim and screened worldwide. In 2012 at the Amiens International Film Festival, the film won the Audience Award for the Best Film. It also won the SIGNIS Award for Special Mention at the same festival. In the same year, the film was nominated for Tanit d'Or award for the Best Film at the Carthage Film Festival. In 2014, actress Rosa Mario won the Andorinha Trophy for the Best Supporting Actress at the Cineport - Portuguese Film Festival.

== Cast ==
- Sumeia Maculuva as Margarida
- Iva Mugalela as Rosa
- Hermelinda Cimela as Comandante Maria João
- Rosa Mario as Susana
- Victor Gonçalves
