= Luís Carlos Patraquim =

Mozambican poet, playwright and journalist

- Born: 26 March 1953 (age 72); Maputo
- Citizenship: Mozambique
- Occupation(s): Journalist, Writer, Poet, Screenwriter, Director

Luís Carlos Patraquim (born on 26 March 1953 in Maputo) is a Mozambican poet, playwright and journalist.

He moved to Sweden as a refugee in 1973. In 1975, he moved back to Mozambique, where he worked for A Tribuna magazine, the Agência de Informação de Moçambique (AIM), the Instituto Nacional de Cinema de Moçambique (INC) and Tempo magazine.

Patraquim lives in Portugal since 1986.

== Works ==
- Monção. Lisboa e Maputo. Edições 70 e Instituto Nacional do Livro e do Disco, 1980.
- A inadiável viagem. Maputo, Association of Mozambican Writers, 1985.
- Vinte e tal novas formulações e uma elegia carnívora. Lisboa, ALAC, 1992. Prefácio de Ana Mafalda Leite.
- Mariscando luas. Lisboa, Vega, 1992. Com Chichorro (ilustrações) e Ana Mafalda Leite.
- Lidemburgo blues. Lisboa, Editorial Caminho, 1997.
- O osso côncavo e outros poemas (1980–2004). Lisboa, Editorial Caminho, 2005. Antologia de poemas dos livros anteriores e poemas novos. Com um texto de Ana Mafalda Leite: O que sou de sobrepostas vozes.
- Pneuma Lisboa, Editorial Caminho, 2009.
- A Canção de Zefanías Sforza (romance). Porto, Porto Editora, 2010.
- Antologia Poética. Belo Horizonte, Editora UFMG, 2011. Coleção Poetas de Moçambique. Antologia de poemas dos livros anteriores e poemas novos. Com posfácio de Cíntia Machado de Campos Almeida : Incursões de um poeta 'nas veias em fúria da memória'

=== Theatre ===
- Karingana
- Vim-te buscar
- D'abalada
- Tremores íntimos anónimos (with António Cabrita)

== Awards ==
- Prémio Nacional de Poesia de Moçambique (1995)

== Sources and external links ==
- Mexia, Pedro. "Novas formulações moçambicanas" [New formulations from Mozambique]. revista.agulha.nom.br (in Portuguese). Archived from the original on 2013-07-20.
- Saúte, Nelson; Sopa, António, eds. (1992). A Ilha de Moçambique pela voz dos poetas [The Island of Mozambique through the voice of poets] (in Portuguese). Lisboa: Edições 70. OCLC 31046546.
- Rossano, Nelson (ed.). "Poesia Africana. LUÍS CARLOS PATRAQUIM" (in Portuguese).
