= The Train of Salt and Sugar =

2016 Mozambican film

- Film poster
- Directed by: Licínio Azevedo
- Written by: Licínio Azevedo
- Starring: Thiago Justino; Melanie de Vales Rafael; Matamba Joaquim; Absalão Narduela; António Nipita
- Production companies: Ukbar Filmes; Ébano Multimedia; Les Films de l'Étranger; Urucu Media; Panda Filmes
- Distributed by: Alambique Filmes (Portugal); e-cinema.com (France); Livres Filmes (Brazil)
- Release dates: 10 August 2016 (Locarno); 28 September 2017 (Portugal)
- Running time: 93 minutes
- Countries: Portugal; Mozambique; France; South Africa; Brazil
- Language: Portuguese
- Box office: $2,293

The Train of Salt and Sugar (Portuguese: Comboio de Sal e Açúcar) is a 2016 internationally co-produced adventure film written and directed by Licínio Azevedo. It was selected as the Mozambican entry for the Best Foreign Language Film at the 90th Academy Awards, but it was not nominated.

== Plot ==
In the midst of civil war, a train with passengers and goods must travel 500 miles through guerrilla-held territory to Malawi. Early into the trip, the train is halted due to rain damage to the track. Although repairs are made, the stall is prolonged by orders not to advance. After hearing a whistle of the "spirits that protect [the guerrillas]", commander "Seven Ways" instructs immediate departure during the night.

While at Namina, the conductor witnesses two soldiers attempting to break into the cargo, for which they are warned and the younger soldier reveals his nickname, "Bayonet". Officer Salomão attempts to coerce Rosa, riding to her first job as a nurse, into cooking for him and expresses intent to rape her, but Lieutenant Taiar intervenes. After departing in the morning, the train is attacked by a small guerrilla unit, injuring a man. Prior, they destroyed 700 meters of the track, requiring the civilians to repair it. During the process the guerrillas returned, resulting in 5 civilian casualties.

In an evening conversation with Taier, Rosa says she is interested in moving to Cuamba, where her grandfather lived. Taier is receptive, revealing he wanted to be an agriculturalist but was drafted after high school. The train then travels to Ribáuè, recently ransacked and abandoned. Left to get a shawl, Rosa witnesses the soldiers execute an alleged spy dressed in civilian clothing. Additionally displaying their brutality, Salomão has Bayonet beat a man for requesting his wife be returned to care for her family after he raped her.

While the Seven Ways scouted ahead, Salomão and other soldiers pillaged the town, angering Taiar. They are interrupted by the order to advance. While at Iapala, the conductor asks a station officer about the status of the tracks between Iapala and Malema, to which he gets the dismissive response of "some [guerrilla] movement". After it is revealed sugar was stolen, Taiar speaks with Seven Ways about abuses inflicted by Salomão and other soldiers, which Seven Ways excuses as "natural" but accepts a meeting with the previously beaten man; with Salomão present at the hearing, he refuses to testify. Departing at 6 A.M. the next morning, Seven Ways reports the train had a 50-man escort, one anti-aircraft gun, two locomotives, one water tank, and one cargo container.

On the tracks, soldier Florindo's head on a pike is removed, with one soldier claiming guerrilla Commander Xipoco is responsible. Shortly after, the train is halted when met by blown up tracks. Taiar radios to Seven Ways, who scouts ahead and estimates kilometers of ruined tracks and that the guerrilla encampment holds 100 men, five bazookas, and two 60mm mortars and one 80mm. He tells Taiar and Salomão whomever kills Xipoco can loot his "good boots". However, the crewman learn their water was not filled at Iapala, with Seven Ways ordering a detachment return to refill. When this fails, Taiar has water fetched from a nearby lake. During this time, Seven Ways is injured by a landmine. During another skirmish at the train, Amelia gives birth and Seven Ways recovers.

At the next stop, Taiar and Rosa hang out at a nearby river. Jealous when seeing Rosa with chicken gifted by Taiar, Salomão promises to make her his woman by the end of the trip. For this, Taiar confronts Salomão by threatening him, slapping him when he begins to talk back. During the next period, the train is ambushed after it hits an landmine. During the ensuing battle, Taiar kills Xipoco, leading to victory and the soldiers' celebration. However, Amelia died and Salomão shoots Taiar. After the latter kills the former, he goes to Rosa. Seven Ways and two soldiers find Salomão's body in the bushes and he orders they leave him unburied.

Xipoco is hung to the front car and Taiar dies in Rosa's arms during the last distance to Malemba. The closing scene is of a military truck carrying Taiar's body driving beside the departing train.

== Cast ==
The cast includes:

- Thiago Justino as Salomão
- Melanie de Vales Rafael as Rosa
- Matamba Joaquim as Taiar
- António Napita as Seven Ways
- Absalão Narduela as Ascêncio
- Mário Mabjaia as Adriano Gil
- Hermelinda Simela as Amélia

== See also ==
- List of submissions to the 90th Academy Awards for Best Foreign Language Film
- List of Mozambican submissions for the Academy Award for Best Foreign Language Film
