= Zdravko Velimirović =

Yugoslavian film director

- Born: 11 October 1930; Cetinje, Zeta Banovina, Kingdom of Yugoslavia
- Died: 7 February 2005 (aged 74); Belgrade, Serbia and Montenegro
- Occupations: Film director, screenwriter
- Years active: 1954-2005
- Spouse: Ranka Velimirović
- Children: Milica Velimirović; Mladen Velimirović
- Relatives: Dr Vesna Velimirović Filipović (sister)
- Website: www.weblibra.com

Zdravko Velimirović (Serbian Cyrillic: Здравко Велимировић; 11 October 1930 – 7 February 2005) was a Yugoslavian film director and screenwriter, University Professor, a member of the Academy of Arts and Sciences. He also directed over fifty documentaries and short films and eight feature films between 1954 and 2005, twenty radio dramas, five theatre plays and had varied art photography exhibitions.

== Early life ==
Zdravko Velimirović was born on 11 October 1930 in Cetinje, the son of Professor Luka Velimirović and Professor Zagorka (née Balić) Velimirović.

=== Cetinje ===
Zdravko as young boy and the family, father Luka, mother Zagorka and sister Vesna lived in Cetinje at “Banski stanovi”. His first contact with cinema was at “Gurdić” in Cetinje where he would go as a boy to watch some world significant movies that inspired him and developed desire for film making. At “Banski stanovi” (block of flats for high governmental officials and families), in Cetinje, Zdravko lived at “Banski stanovi”, in the same block of flats together with his friends and school mates: Borislav Pekić, Pavle Vuisić, Minja Dedić who later in life also became eminent in Culture and Arts.

=== Growing up in Kotor ===
Zdravko spent significant years of his life in Kotor Old town – Bay of Kotor (Boka Kotorska where he later completed High school. He lived at Buća Palace (built 14th century) in Old town Kotor with his family: father Luka, professor and director of school, his mother Zagorka, teacher and sister Vesna, who was later doctor, paediatrician in Kotor hospital. Kotor was very important inspiration for his Art studies and further Art creation in life, Zdravko already in school started performing in drama classes, theatre, recitals, theatre plays and ultimately film work preparations. He continued education at Film Academies in Belgrade and Paris. During his big career he made seven documentaries about his beloved Boka Bay and Kotor where he grew up and where his mother Zagorka Velimirović Balić was born.

== Career ==
During his career he directed and was a screenwriter for feature films, documentaries,short films, TV series, radio dramas, and theater plays. Apart from his achievements in Yugoslavia, he cooperated with film makers internationally. He was also a university professor and the principal at the Belgrade Dramatic Arts University. He married film and TV producer, Ranka Velimirovic, in 1963.

== Filmography ==
Year	Film	Original title	Film festival	Award	Credited as	
Year	Film	Original title	Film festival	Award	Director	Screenwriter
1960	The Fourteenth Day	Dan četrnaesti	Cannes Film Festival 1961, Cannes Film Festival Classics Selection 2021			
1965	Provereno nema mina	Проверено — мин нет				
1968	Mount of Lament	Lelejska gora				
1974	The Dervish and Death	Derviš i smrt	Yugoslav submissions for the 47th Academy Award for Best Foreign; Language Film 1975, Pula Film Festival 1974	Golden Arena	Yes	
1975	The Peaks of Zelengora	Vrhovi Zelengore	Pula Film Festival 1976	Golden Arena		Yes
1978	The Battle for the Southern Railway	Dvoboj za južnu prugu				
1981	Dorotej	Dorotej				
1985	The time of Leopards	O Tempo dos Leopardos, Vreme leoparda				

=== Series ===
- Sinovi (1989) - 2 episodes
- Rijeka Zeta - Zeta zemlja (1991) - 5 documentary episodes
- Put za Pivu (1993) - 4 episodes (1. A zna Piva šta su muke. 2. Doziv Sile i Zdravine 3, Piva zbori i sebi i svome 4. Krov u Pivi, čeka ukućane)
- Lovćen vidokrug (1995) - 5 episodes

=== Short ===
- Tvoj rođendan (1961)
- Nevoljite na pokojniot K. K (1963)
- Pogibija (1972)
- Most (1979)

=== Documentaries ===
- Čovjek i voda (1954)
- Zublja Grahovačka (1958)
- U spomen slavne mornarice (1959)
- Nokturno za Kotor (1959)
- Između dva kralja (1959)
- Za danas, za sjutra (1959)
- Za Djerdapsku branu (1960)
- Četvrta strana (1963)
- Rade, sin Tomov; Njegošu uz hodočašće (1964)
- Lux Aeterna; Večita svetlost (1965)
- Ekselencije (1966)
- Španija naše mladosti (1967)
- Skenderbeg (1968)
- A, to ste vi! (1968)
- Tajna večera; Medijala (1969)
- Prvi pešački prolazi (1969)
- Srušeni grad (1970)
- Ostrog (1970)
- Umir krvi (1971)
- More, sunce i... (1971)
- U zdravom telu, zdrav je i duh (1971)
- Tito - vrhovni komandant (1972)
- Dokaz (1972)
- Podanici drevnog kulta (1977)
- Derviši (1977)
- Most (1979)
- Veselnik (1980)
- Gradsko saobraćajno Beograd (1981)
- Kad ti kao ličnost nestaješ (1983)
- Srpska akademija nauka i umetnosti (1984)
- Kako sačuvati grad (1987)
- Uzvišenje (Exaltation) (1991)
- Rijeka Zeta, majka i kolijevka (Zeta, mother and cradle) (1991)
- Povratak na Medun (Return to Medun) (1992)
- Piva (1993)
- Njegoš u Boki (Njegos in the bay of Kotor) (1995)
- Naši dragi gosti (Our dear guests) (1996)
- Kapa lovćenska (The cap of Lovcen) (1996)
- Od zlata jabuka (The golden apple) (1996)
- Na svetim vodama Lima (The holy water of river Lim) (1996)
- Gifts to the home of sacred warriors (Gifts to the home of holy warriors) (Original title: Darovi domu svetih ratnika) (2004)

== Awards ==
- The "13th july" award for the film "Zublja grahovačka", Yugoslavia 1958.
- The "13th july" award for the film "Lelejska gora", Yugoslavia 1967.
- Golden Arena for Best Director 1974
- Golden Arena for Best Screenplay 1976
- Silver Knight award for film "Gifts to the home of holy warriors" at Golden knights film festival in Tambov, Russia 2004.
- Award for best religious-cultural film for film "Gifts to the home of holy warriors" at Religious, cultural and tourist film festival in Lecce, Italy 2007.
- Award for film "Gifts to the home of sacred warriors" in the category of religious documentaries at ART&TUR International Film Festival in Barcelos, Portugal 2008.

== Sources ==
1,• "Srpski Legat: Rođen je reditelj, scenarista i profesor Zdravko Velimirović". srpskilegat.rs. 11 October 2016. Retrieved 16 June 2020. 2.• ^ Jump up to: a b "Intervju: Ranka Velimirović, supruga i saradnica Zdravka Velimirovića". dan.co.me. 21 February 2015. Retrieved 29 September 2015. 3. ^ Jump up to: a b c d e "Portret Zdravka Velimirovića". Seecult.org. 13 December 2010. Retrieved 29 September 2015. 4.• ^ Jump up to: a b "Omaž reditelju Zdravku Velimirović u Kotoru". Radio Kotor www.radiokotor.info. 22 March 2018. Retrieved 12 August 2018. 5.• ^ Jump up to: a b "Pekić i Velimirović: Išli su sami svojim putem". Večernje novosti online www.novosti.rs. 14 April 2014. Retrieved 29 September 2015.
