= O Tempo dos Leopardos =

- Directed by: Zdravko Velimirovic
- Screenplay by: Luis Patraquim; Branimir Šćepanović; Zdravko Velimirovic
- Based on: story by Licínio de Azevedo
- Produced by: Mihajlo Rašić; Luis Simao
- Starring: Santos Mulungo; Ana Magaia; Simiao Mazuze; Marcelino Alves; Armando Loja
- Cinematography: Dušan Ninkov
- Edited by: Marko Babac
- Music by: Kornelije Kovač
- Production companies: Avala Film; CFS Košutnjak; Instituto Nacional de Cinema de Moçambique
- Release date: June 16, 1985
- Running time: 99 minutes
- Country: Mozambique
- Language: Portuguese

O Tempo dos Leopardos (Serbian: Време леопарда/Vreme leoparda) is a 1985 war drama. It is a Yugoslav-Mozambican co-production directed by Zdravko Velimirović. O Tempo dos Leopardos was the first Mozambican feature film.

== Cast ==
- Ana Magaia as Ana
- Armando Loja as Armando
- Santos Mulungo as Pedro
- Simiao Mazuze as Januario
- Marcelino Alves as Vasco

== Credits ==
- Screenplay: Luis Patraquim, Branimir Šćepanović, Zdravko Velimirović
- Production design: Machado da Graca
- Stage design: Fausta Ficnocchi
- Music composer: Kornelije Kovač
- Editing: Marko Babac
- Script supervisor: Ranka Velimirović
- 1st assistant director: Camilo de Sousa
- 2nd assistant director: Henrique Caldeira
- 2nd assistant director: Sol de Carvalho
- Sound editor: Dragan Cenerić

== Plot ==
The Time of the Leopards is set Mozambique in 1971, the last days of Portuguese colonial occupation. The film is a fictional account of the anti-colonial Mozambican War of Independence told from the perspective of the colonised.

== See also ==
- Mozambican War of Independence
