= Estas são as armas =

- Release date: 1978
- Running time: 50 minutes
- Country: Mozambique

Estas são as armas, These are the Guns, is a Mozambican 1978 documentary film.

== Synopsis ==
Shot by a group of students from the National Cinema Institute (INC) and supervised by Murilo Salles and Luís Bernardo Honwana, the documentary These are the Guns shows images of the Rhodesian troops invading the People's Republic of Mozambique. In 1977, a film crew starts out from Maputo and heads towards the province of Tete to film the damages caused by the air raids in rural areas.
