= Licínio Azevedo =

Brazilian and Mozambican film director, screenwriter and film producer

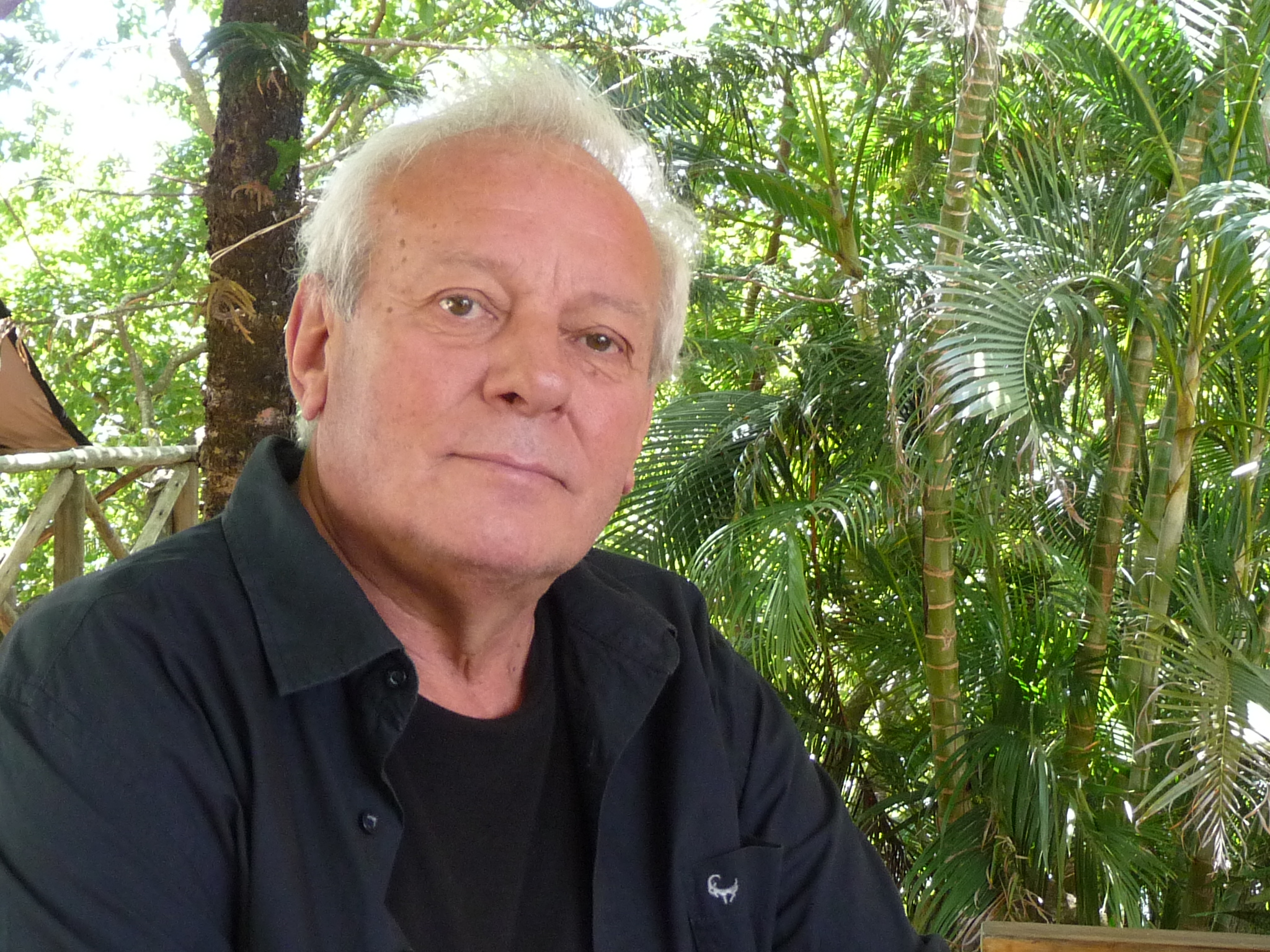
- Licínio Azevedo at the Île Courts International Short Film Festival of Mauritius, 2017.
- Born: 27 May 1951; Porto Alegre, Brazil
- Occupations: Film director, film producer, screenwriter, novelist, journalist
- Children: Anais Azevedo, Clarice Araujo
- Writing career
- Language: Portuguese
- Notable works: movies Desobediência (Disobedience, 2003), Virgem Margarida (Virgin Margarida, 2012), and Comboio de Sal e Açúcar (The Train of Salt and Sugar, 2016).

Licínio Silveira Azevedo (Licínio de Azevedo, Licínio Azevedo, Novo Hamburgo, Porto Alegre, Brazil, 1951) is a Brazilian–Mozambican journalist, film producer, screenwriter, and film director of award-winning documentaries and feature films.

== Biography ==
Born in Porto Alegre in 1951, journalist Azevedo left Brazil during the military dictatorship there for post-revolutionary Portugal in 1976, continuing to Guinea-Bissau where he trained journalists. He interviewed members of the liberation movement PAIGC on their struggle against Portugal and published the results with Da Paz Rodrigues in their book Diário da libertação : a Guiné-Bissau da nova África (Liberation diary: the Guinea-Bissau of the new Africa, 1977). Living in Mozambique since the 1970s, he reported on Frelimo's struggle in Relatos do povo armado (Stories from the armed people, 1983).

At the Maputo Instituto Nacional de Cinema de Moçambique (INC, National Cinema Institute of Mozambique, now Instituto Nacional de Audiovisual e Cinema de Moçambique INAC), Azevedo worked with film directors Ruy Guerra (born in Maputo, 1931) and Jean-Luc Godard (1930–2022). Azevedo became one of the founders of the Mozambican film production company Ébano Multimédia, and director and producer of various feature films and documentaries. His first medium-length fiction film The Great Bazaar (O Grande Bazar) and other films were presented at many film festivals, such as the Fribourg International Film Festival. His documentaries and drama feature films obtained seven prizes and three award nominations at film festivals.

== Books by Avezedo ==
Avezedo published a number of books in Portuguese, such as:

- Azevedo, Licínio; Da Paz Rodrigues, Maria (1977). Diário da libertação : a Guiné-Bissau da nova África [Liberation diary: the Guinea-Bissau of the new Africa]. Coleçaõ Testemunhos, 2. São Paulo: Versus. OCLC 462846146.
- Azevedo, Licínio (1983). Relatos do povo armado [Stories from the armed people]. Colecção Depoimentos, 1. Maputo: Cadernos Tempo. OCLC 10799692.
- Azevedo, Licínio (1995). Coração forte [Strong heart]. Lisboa: Edições Dinossauro. ISBN 9789728165024. OCLC 36203107.
- Azevedo, Licínio (1997). O comboio de sal e açúcar [The salt and sugar train]. Maputo: Ndjira. OCLC 40783711.

== Filmography ==
Azevedo's films include:

Year	Film	Genre	Role	Duration (min)
1985	O Tempo dos Leopardos (The Time of the Leopards, Vreme leoparda) by Zdravko Velimirovic	War drama feature	Co-writer	95 m
1988	A Colheita Do Diabo (The Devil's Harvest)	Feature	Director with Brigitte Bagnol	54 m
1990	Marracuene (location) (Two Banks of a Mozambican River)	Documentary	Director	43 m
1992	Adeus RDA (Farewell GDR)	Docufiction	Director	26 m
1994	A Árvore dos Antepassados (The Tree of Ancestors)	Drama feature	Director	50 m
1996	The Water War (A Guerra da Água)	Documentary	Director, co-writer	73 m
1997	Tchuma Tchato	Documentary	Director	56 m
1998	Massassane (Afela Kwatine)	Documentary	Director	46 m
1999	A Última Prostituta (The Last Prostitute)	Drama fiction	Director	48 m
2000	Histórias Comunitárias (Community Stories)	Documentary series	Director and screenwriter with Orlando Mesquita	6 x 26 m
2001	A Ponte (The Bridge)	Documentary	Director	52 m
2002	Eclipse	Short drama documentary	Producer	25 m
2003	Disobedience (Desobediência)	Drama feature	Director, screenwriter	92 m
2003	Mãos de Barro (Hands of Clay)	Documentary	Screenwriter	50 m
2005	The Demining Camp (Acampamento de Desminagem)	Documentary	Director, screenwriter, coproducer	60 m
2006	The Great Bazaar (O Grande Bazar)	Drama feature	Director, screenwriter	56 m
2007	Night Lodgers (Hóspedes da Noite)	Documentary	Director, screenwriter, producer	52 or 53 m
2010	A Ilha dos Espíritos (L'Île des Esprits / Island of the Spirits)	Documentary	Director, screenwriter	90 m
2011	Crônicas de Moçambique by Margarida Cardoso (Licinio de Azevedo, chroniques du Mozambique)	Documentary portrait	Interviewee	88 m
2012	Virgin Margarida (Virgem Margarida)	Drama feature	Director, co-writer	90 m
2016	The Train of Salt and Sugar (Comboio de Sal e Açúcar, Le Train de Sel et de Sucre)	Drama feature	Director, screenwriter, producer	93 m
2021	Nhinguitimo (Vent du Sud)	Short, drama	Director	23 m

== Awards ==
Azevedo's films obtained seven prizes and three nominations, including:

Film	Festival	Award
Desobediência (Disobedience, 2003)	Biarritz International Festival of Audiovisual Programming	2003 Silver FIPA Fiction
Acampamento de Desminagem (The Demining Camp)	CinePort	2005 Andorinha Digital Award Best Documentary
Hóspedes da Noite (Night Lodgers, 2007)	Biarritz International Festival of Audiovisual Programming	2008 Golden FIPA Reports and Social Issues
Virgem Margarida (Virgin Margarida, 2012)	Amiens International Film Festival	2012 Audience Award Best Film, 2012 SIGNIS Award – Special Mention
Comboio de Sal e Açúcar (The Train of Salt and Sugar, 2016)	Cairo International Film Festival	2016 Silver Pyramid Best Director
Comboio de Sal e Açúcar	Carthage Film Festival	2017 Tanit d'or Narrative Feature Film

== Secondary literature ==
- Owen, Hilary (2021). "7. In the name of the Rosa. The ethnographic reflex in the cinema of Licínio Azevedo". In De Medeiros, Paulo; Apa, Livia (eds.). Contemporary Lusophone African Film : transnational communities and alternative modernities. London and New York: Routledge Taylor & Francis Group. pp. 113–130. ISBN 9780367134976. OCLC 1176322750.
