= Marfilmes =

Marfilmes is a Portuguese distributor specialized in Portuguese-speaking cinema from classics to moderns, dealing particularly with Portuguese-African speaking films. The company collaborated with the African Film Library and increased the scope of its titles to classical African films of different origins and languages.

Marfilmes has a large experience within Portuguese cinema, contributing to that the years of exclusive collaboration with Rádio e Televisão de Portugal (RTP), the state Portuguese television.

== African films distributed by Marfilmes ==
Country	Director	Films	Year
United Kingdom	Amy Hardie and Arthur Howes	Kafi's Story	1989
Cape Verde	Ana Ramos Lisboa	Amílcar Cabral	2001
United Kingdom	Arthur Howes	Nuba Conversations	2000
France	Christian Lajoumard	Children of Noma	2005
Mali	Falaba Issa Traoré	Bamunan	1990
Portugal	Fernando Vendrell	Light Drops	2002
Guinea-Bissau	Flora Gomes	Mortu Nega	1988
Guinea-Bissau	Flora Gomes	The Blue Eyes of Yonta	1992
Portugal and Angola	Inês Gonçalves and Kiluanje Liberdade	Hope The Pitanga Cherries Grow - Tales of Luanda	2007
Portugal and Angola	Inês Gonçalves and Kiluanje Liberdade	Tchiloli, Masks and Myths	2009
Portugal and Angola	Inês Gonçalves and Kiluanje Liberdade	Luanda, The Music Factory	2009
Mozambique	Isabel Noronha	Ngwenya, The Crocodile	2007
Republic of the Congo	Jean-Michel Tchissoukou	The Wrestlers	1982
Cameroon	Jean-Pierre Dikongué Pipa	Muna Moto	1975
Cameroon	Jean-Pierre Dikongué Pipa	Le prix de la liberté	1978
Cameroon	Jean-Pierre Dikongué Pipa	Funny Stories and Funny People	1983
Cameroon	Jean-Pierre Dikongué Pipa	Badiaga	1987
Portugal	Jorge António	Other Moves	2003
Cape Verde	Júlio Silvão Tavares	Batuque, the Soul of a People	2007
United Kingdom	Karen Boswall	Marrabenta Stories	2004
Ivory Coast	Kozoloa Yeo	Petanqui	1983
Cape Verde	Leão Lopes	The Island of Contenda	1995
Burundi	Léonce Ngabo	Gito l'ingrat	1992
Mozambique	Licínio Azevedo	The Water War	1995
Mozambique	Licínio Azevedo	The Bridge	2001
Mozambique	Licínio Azevedo	Disobedience	2002
Mozambique	Licínio Azevedo	Hands of Clay	2003
Mozambique	Licínio Azevedo	The Demining Camp	2005
Mozambique	Licínio Azevedo	The Great Bazaar	2006
Mozambique	Licínio Azevedo	Night Lodgers	2007
Mozambique	Licínio Azevedo	The Island of The Spirits	2010
Brazil	Luciana Hees	The Blue Salon	2011
Niger	Moustapha Alassane	Women Cars Villas Money	1972
Niger	Moustapha Alassane	Toula ou Le génie des eaux	1973
Niger	Oumarou Ganda	Saitane	1973
Niger	Oumarou Ganda	The Exiled	1980
Ivory Coast	Roger Gnoan M'Bala	Ablakon	1986
Ivory Coast	Roger Gnoan M'Bala	Bouka	1988
Ivory Coast	Roger Gnoan M'Bala	The Dipri	2009
Ivory Coast	Roger Gnoan M'Bala	The Niambwa People	2009
Sweden	Solveig Nordlund	Nélio's Story	1998
Portugal	Teresa Prata	Terra Sonâmbula	2007

== Films and Filmmakers Film distributed by Portuguese Marfilmes ==
Director	Films	Year
Alberto Seixas Santos	Gentle Morals	1975
Alfred Ehrhardt	Portugal, A Country By The Sea	1952
António da Cunha Telles	Besieged	1970
António da Cunha Telles	My Friends	1974
António da Cunha Telles	Living On	1976
António da Cunha Telles	Pandora	1993
António da Cunha Telles	Kiss Me	2004
António de Macedo	The Vows	1972
António de Macedo	Sunday Afternoon	1965
Carlos Vilardebó	The Enchanted Islands	1965
Fernando Lopes	The Edge of Horizon	1993
J. Ernesto de Sousa	The Puppeteer	1962
João Botelho	Here on Earth	1993
João Botelho	The Northern Land	2009
Joaquim Vieira	The Last Communist	2005
Joaquim Vieira e Fernanda Bizarro	Franco e Salazar - Iberian Brothers	2004
Jom Tob Azulay	The Jew	1995
Jorge Brum do Canto	The Song of The Earth	1938
Jorge Paixão da Costa	The Mystery of Sintra	2007
Leandro Ferreira	The Ones That Came Back	2002
Manuel Guimarães	The Circus	1951
Manuel Guimarães	Nazaré	1952
Manuel Guimarães	Lifes Adrift	1956
Manuel Guimarães	My Little Seamstress	1958
Manuel Guimarães	The Wheat And The Tares	1965
Nicholas Oulman	The man behind Amália	2009
Perdigão Queiroga	The Millionaire	1962
Ricardo Costa	Our Football	1984
Ricardo Costa	Mists	2003
Rui Simões	If You Can Look See, If You Can See Notice	2004
Solveig Nordlund	Low-Flying Aircraft	2001
Teresa Villaverde	In Favour of Light	2003
Vicente Jorge Silva	The Unknown Islands	2008
