= List of Mozambican films =

This is an alphabetical list of films produced in Mozambique.

== 0–9 ==
- 25 (1977)

== A ==
- A Arvore dos Antepassados (1995)

== B ==
- The Ball (2001)
- Banguza Timbila (1982)

== C ==
- Canta Meu Irmao, Ajuda-Me a Cantar (1982), directed by Jose Cardoso (1930-2013)
- Capitalization (2011), directed by Guido Brothers and Aldino Languana.
- The Children's Republic (2010), directed by Flora Gomes, starring Danny Glover, Hedviges Mamudo, and others
- Comédia Infantil (1998), directed by Solveig Nordlund

== D ==
- De Corpo e Alma (2010), directed by Matthieu Bron
- Dina (2010), directed by Mickey Fonseca

== F ==
- Fogata (1992)
- Frontières sanglantes (1987)
- Frutos Da Nossa Colheita (1984)

== G ==
- The Gaze of the Stars (1997), episode of Africa Dreaming, produced by Pedro Pimenta
- O Gotejar da Luz (Light Drops, 2002)
- A Guerra da Água (1995)

== I ==
- I Love You (2007), directed by Rogério Manjate

== K ==
- Kuxa Kanema: The Birth of Cinema (2003)

== L ==
- The Letter (2010), directed by Michele Mathison
- Limpopo (1970)
- Lobolo/The Dowry (2010), directed by Michele Mathison

== M ==
- Mahla (2009), directed by Mickey Fonseca
- Manungo (2007), directed by Tony Magmar starring Camarao de Almeida, Peter Gudo, Tony Miguel and others
- Maputo Mulher (1984)
- Mar de Crenca (1996)
- Marrabenta Stories (2004), directed by Karen Boswall
- O meu marido esta a negar (2007), directed by Rogério Manjate
- A Miner's Tale (2001)
- Mississe (1995), by António Forjaz (Pipas) and Hesham Issawi
- Mueda, Memória e Massacre (1980)
- Música, Moçambique! (1980)

== N ==
- Nico: Maputo (2013)
- Nos criancas Mocambicanas (1983)

== P ==
- Pamberi ne Zimbabwe (1981)
- Poisoned Love (2010), directed by Mickey Fonseca

== S ==
- Samora Machel, Son of Africa (1989)
- Seremos Poetas
- Skipping Rope (1998)
- Street Wheels (1998)

== T ==
- Tatana (2005)
- O Tempo dos Leopardos (1985)
- Terra Sonâmbula (2007)
- Traidos pela Traicão (2010), directed by Mickey Fonseca
- The Train of Salt and Sugar (2016)

== V ==
- O Vento Sopra do Norte (1987)
- Vreme leoparda (1985)
