= Josef Kumbela =

Congolese-born Swiss filmmaker and actor

Joseph Kumbela
- Born: 1958 (age 67–68)
- Citizenship: Democratic Republic of the Congo
- Occupations: Filmmaker; actor
- Known for: Gito, l'ingrat
- Notable work: L'Étranger venu d'Afrique - FEIZHOU LAOWAI; Colis Postal; Taxcarte

Joseph Kumbela (born 1958) is an actor and filmmaker from the Democratic Republic of the Congo who has won awards for his acting.

== Life and career ==
Joseph Kumbela was born in 1958. He has lived in Switzerland since 1980. He started his career as an actor in France and the USA. At the FESPACO awards in 1993 he won the prize for Best Actor for his performance in the comedy Gito l'ingrat (Gito the ungrateful) directed by Leonce Ngabo of Burundi. In this film Gito, a student from Burundi and also a talented couturier in Paris, decides to return home. With his diploma in hand and full of plans about his career, he leaves his French companion Christine promising to bring her to Burundi later. He cannot find work, but meets up with his old childhood sweetheart. Then Christine arrives without warning and discovers what is going on. The two women join to teach Gito a lesson.

Josef Kumbela has written and directed a number of short films since 1994 using his Geneva-based production company. His 1998 film L'étranger venu d'Afrique (The stranger from Africa, or Feizhou Laowai) was the first African film to be shot in China. It looks at a romance between Lulu, an African student, and a Chinese woman, and depicts the clash of cultures.

== Filmography ==
| Year | Title | Role | Notes |
|---|---|---|---|
| 1998 | L'Étranger venu d'Afrique - FEIZHOU LAOWAI | Director, Writer | 13 minutes. Comedy |
| 1996 | Colis Postal | Director | 10 minute comedy |
| 1996 | Taxcarte | Director, Actor | 7 minute comedy |
| 1994 | Perle Noire | Director, Writer | 27 minute comedy drama |
| 1992 | Gito, l'ingrat | Actor | 90 minutes. Comedy |
| | Entre-Deux | Director | 90 minutes. Comedy Drama |
| 1990 | In the Eye of the Snake | Actor | 90 minute thriller |
