= Le prix de la liberté =

Le Prix de la Liberté
- Directed by: Jean-Pierre Dikongué Pipa
- Written by: Jean-Pierre Dikongué Pipa
- Produced by: Cameroun Spectacles
- Starring: Marie-Thérèse Badje; Bibi Kouo; Marthe Momha; Albert Mouangue; Madeleine Ndoum
- Cinematography: Bernard Zitzermann, Étienne de Grammont
- Edited by: Andrée Davanture, Marie-Christine Rongerie
- Music by: Manu Dibango
- Distributed by: Marfilmes
- Release date: 1978
- Running time: 83 minutes
- Country: Cameroon
- Languages: French and Pidgin

Le Prix de la Liberté is a 1978 drama film directed by Jean-Pierre Dikongué Pipa.

== Synopsis ==
After refusing the sexual advances of her village chief and her father’s authority, a young woman runs away from home and goes to town. There she meets several members of her family and tries to start her life from scratches. She enrolls at a high school and makes new friends. However, she realizes that social relations in town also depend on sexual favors and that around her everyone has given in to that practice. When she loses the only man she loved, the girl returns to her village and sets it on fire.

== See also ==
- Jean Pierre Dikongue-Pipa
- History of Cinema in Cameroon
