= Respecting Elders: Communities Against Abuse =

Canadian anti-elder abuse initiative

Respecting Elders: Communities Against Elder Abuse (RECAA) is an elder abuse initiative that operates in Montreal, Quebec, Canada.

== History and mission ==
RECAA is a community organization founded in 2003. Its members visit seniors groups to perform theatre and discuss elder abuse. They also participate in events such as World Elder Abuse Awareness Day.

RECAA works with ethnocultural communities in Montreal, and aims to fight elder isolation, situations of dependence on the family, and the lack of support that might otherwise help elders in situations of abuse. They advocate for communication, reciprocity, and respect in a way that challenges gerontologically based intervention models, which do not take into account the specific dilemmas of cultural communities.

Their brochures, available in Vietnamese, Tamil, Hindi, Portuguese, Italian, French, and English, define elder abuse as the physical, psychological and financial exploitation of an elder.

== Forum Theatre ==
RECAA's strategy is to foster dialogue is through Forum Theatre, a variant of the Theatre of the Oppressed created by Augusto Boal. RECAA's troupe of non-professional actors also works with a larger network of 100 or so members who attend their events and meetings. They visit seniors’ groups and act out non-verbal scenes of elder abuse in theatrical performances. The goal of the performances is to engender discussions of alternative outcomes for older adults. Participants are invited to play the role of a person in trouble or difficulty and to find a solution.

== Digital technologies ==
In 2011, as a response to what it perceived as a shift towards mediatization in the communications environment, RECAA began incorporating digital technologies in its work. RECAA uses digital technologies to create an archive of its work and to reach out to a greater number of elders. For example, one of the videos produced was included in a special issue on aging in the magazine Montreal Serai.

== Awards ==
In 2015, RECAA received an Engaged Scholar Award given by Concordia University to community organizations outside the university.

== See also ==
- Help the Aged Canada
