= Križnar =

Križnar is a Slovene surname. Notable people with the surname include:

- Nika Križnar (born 2000), Slovene ski jumper
- Tomo Križnar (born 1954), Slovene peace activist
