= Histoires drôles et drôles de gens =

Histoires Drôles et Drôles de Gens
- Directed by: Jean-Pierre Dikongué Pipa
- Written by: Jean-Pierre Dikongué Pipa
- Produced by: Cameroon Spectacles
- Starring: Anderson-André Bodjongo; Marguerite Ngandong; André Njuega
- Edited by: Michèlle Hollander, Dominique Martin
- Distributed by: Marfilmes
- Release date: 1983
- Running time: 83 minutes
- Country: Cameroon
- Languages: French and Pidgin

Histoires Drôles et Drôles de Gens is a 1983 comedy film directed by Jean-Pierre Dikongué Pipa.

== Synopsis ==
An African storyteller humorously and kindly talks about how some of his fellow countrymen are emulating the habits of white people and "Their stuff". He thus presents several cases to prove his point. In one of them a supposed to be planter and businessman who underpays an employee gets framed by his own folks. A young boy jumps from a high tree with an open umbrella to copy the way the parachutists do in the city. A few other examples are as pathetic or comical. At the epilogue our storyteller finds himself being laughed at, at a bistro in Paris. The way he deals with the situation is kind and again humorous.

This was the last film directed by Jean-Pierre Dikongué Pipa and it was lost for around two decades.

== Bibliography ==
- Armes, Roy, ´Dictionary of African filmmakers´, Indiana University Press, 2008, p. 148

== See also ==
- Jean Pierre Dikongue-Pipa
- History of Cinema in Cameroon
