= Water War =

Water War can refer to:

- Water conflict, a war waged over water resources
- Water fight, when people use water to splash at each other
- Naval warfare, when war takes place not on land but on the water
- "Water War" (Star Wars: The Clone Wars)

== See also ==
- War over Water (disambiguation)
