= Sensory Labyrinth Theatre =

- Major figures: Iwan Brioc
- Influences: Theatre of the Oppressed, sensory poetics
- Influenced: Context Oriented Arts

Sensory Labyrinth Theatre (SLT) is an applied, immersive, site-specific and one-to-one multi-sensory theatre methodology developed by theatre director Iwan Brioc. The approach draws on Enrique Vargas's sensory theatre practices and Augusto Boal's Theatre of the Oppressed.

SLT combines immersive performance with participatory and mindfulness-based practices. Audience members usually move individually through a sequence of spaces designed around sensory experiences rather than a conventional stage-based performance.

== Methodology ==
A central feature of SLT is the use of what practitioners call "sensory portals". These are individual performance environments created during workshops and arranged in a sequence connected by pathways. Audience members move through the resulting labyrinth individually and encounter different sensory experiences along the route.

The methodology places greater emphasis on sensory perception and individual experience than on conventional narrative or staged dialogue. Brioc has linked this approach to ideas about perception and awareness associated with physicist David Bohm.

== Underlying philosophy ==
SLT forms part of a broader framework developed by Brioc known as Context Oriented Arts (CoArts). The framework treats artistic practice as a way of examining the context in which experiences are perceived, rather than focusing only on their content.

According to Brioc's formulation, CoArts combines artistic practice with approaches derived from mindfulness. It emphasizes observing experiences without immediately interpreting or attempting to control them.

== Context-oriented arts ==
Context Oriented Arts provides the theoretical framework used by Brioc to describe SLT and related practices. In his writings, Brioc argues that theatre can influence how participants perceive and interpret experience.

The framework is divided into three areas: approach, practice and integration. SLT is described within this framework as its principal performance method. In a typical SLT performance, individual audience members travel through a darkened or partially darkened environment and encounter a series of sensory installations or performances.

Practitioners describe these encounters as intended to draw attention to sensory memory, perception and the participant's relationship to the surrounding environment.

== Training and influence ==
Theatr Cynefin has offered training in Sensory Labyrinth Theatre, and the methodology has also been used by other theatre practitioners and community-based performance projects. SLT remains the principal performance practice associated with Context Oriented Arts.

== See also ==
- Immersive theatre
- Participatory theatre
- Mindfulness
- Iwan Brioc
