= Sankurathri Foundation =

Indian foundation

- Founded: 1989
- Founder: Chandra Sekhar Sankurathri
- Purpose: Education, Eye care and Emergency relief
- Location: Penumarthi Road, Kakinada, Andhra Pradesh, INDIA 533005
- Origins: Canada
- Region served: Andhra Pradesh, INDIA
- Key people: Padma Shri Awardee Chandra Sekhar Sankurathri (Executive Trustee)
- Website: www.sankurathri.org

Sankurathri Foundation (SF) was established in 1989 by Dr. Chandra Sekhar Sankurathri, a Padma Shri Awardee, in memory of his wife Manjari, son Kiran and daughter Sarada, who died in the bombing of Air India Flight 182 off the coast of Ireland on 23 June 1985.

== ChandraSekhar Sankurathri ==
Chandrasekhar Sankurathri was born as the youngest of eight children to Sankurathri Appala Narasayya Naidu and Sankurathri Ramayamma on 20 November 1943 in Singarayakonda, Andhra Pradesh, India. He attended Municipal High School in Rajahmundry; Andhra University, Waltair; Memorial University of Newfoundland, Canada; and University of Alberta, Canada. Chandrasekhar Sankurathri worked as a scientific evaluator with Health Canada in Ottawa, as well as a visiting scientist for the Ministry of Fisheries, in Canada and a scientific evaluator for Canada's Ministry of Health.

=== Personal life ===
Chandrasekhar Sankurathri married Manjari on 13 May 1975 in Kakinada, India. Together they had a son, Srikiran, and a daughter, Sarada. Manjari, Srikiran and Sarada were killed in the Air India Flight 182 bombing on 23 June 1985 off the coast of Ireland.

=== Establishment of Foundations ===
Following the bombing, he resigned his job in Canada and returned to India in 1988. He established the Manjari Sankurathri Memorial Foundation in 1989 in memory of his wife, which is a registered charity in Canada. He established the Sankurathri Foundation in India in memory of his family in 1989. The Foundation's goals are to improve the quality of life of needy people in the rural and remote areas of Andhra Pradesh. He established Sarada Vidyalayam in 1992 in his daughter's name, which is a High school to provide free education for rural poor children. Sankurathri established Srikiran Institute of Ophthalmology in 1993, named after his son. As of October 2019, the foundation has restored vision to more than 270,000 people among the needy and the poor and the economically backward and weaker sections and eliminated illiteracy through Sarada Vidyalayam and educated more than 3,000 rural poor children, providing them free facilities.

== Origin and objectives ==
Sankurathri Foundation is working in collaboration with the Manjari Sankurathri Memorial Foundation, established in 1989 in Ottawa, Ontario, Canada. The organisation receives the majority of the funds from donors to operate various projects. A board of volunteers manages and oversees the distribution of all donations for humanitarian projects in India. In 1989, the active implementation of MSMF objectives marked the onset of The Sankurathri Foundation, which is currently managed by three volunteer trustees. Dr. Chandrasekhar Sankurathri remains the president of the Manjari Sankurathri Memorial Foundation and Executive Trustee of the Sankurathri Foundation.

The Sankurathri Foundation was registered as a non-profit organization in India with the purpose of improving the quality of life for the destitute and downtrodden in society. This is planned through education, health care, and disaster relief programs. All the activities are being organized from Kakinada, in the East Godavari District of Andhra pradesh, serving a population of over five million. Till August 2015 the programme outreach spread over four districts of Andhra Pradesh around Kakinada is 20 million. Chandrasekhar lives on site and supervises all internal programs and outreach campaigns.

Sankurathri Foundation is implementing educational programs through Sarada Vidyalayam, health care programs through SriKiran Institute of Ophthalmology and disaster relief programs through Spandana.

== Sarada Vidyalayam ==
Sarada Vidyalayam consists of three schools- Primary, High, and Vocational and had started in the year 1992 in Kakinada, his wife's hometown, and gradually grew over the years. While the primary school provides instruction in grades one to five, the High school covers grades six to ten, and till September 2008 more than 1200 students graduated. The vocational School will provide much needed job skills to unemployed youth in the region. Sarada vidyalayam opened its doors in 1992 with 25 children enrolled in grade one. The current enrollment in the year 2015 is 165. The school follows the Andhra pradesh State Government syllabus. The school claims a zero drop-out rate in a scenario where national average is 50%. In addition to the academic subjects, children are encouraged to participate in activities such as gardening, drawing, painting, sewing, embroidery, yoga, dance, drama, and crafts. The children of the school have done very well academically as well as in extra curricular activities. The school has been formally recognized for its achievements and designated as a model school in the district. The primary school is free for all children. The children receive lunch, milk, uniforms, shoes, books, schoolbags, transportation, medical checkups, and medicines free of cost but the students should ensure discipline and interest to learn. Sarada Vidyalayam is supported by MSMF, Asha for Education, St. Isidore School, St. Gregory Catholic School and other donors. He was named as Paul Harris Fellow by the Rotary Foundation, USA for his humanitarian work. For kids of the village the school is a gateway for good life and the management ensures that students are in time to assembly, ritual walk around the statue of goddess known as Sarada and the teachings happen under huge mango trees in campus. Also the students nurture good ambitions even if many of their parents are not even literate.

== SriKiran Institute of Ophthalmology ==
SriKiran Institute of Ophthalmology was inaugurated in January, 1993 with a mission to "provide quality eye care with compassion which is accessible, affordable and equitable to all". The new hospital building has ample waiting areas for out patients, five fully equipped air-conditioned operating theatres, speciality clinics for cornea, glaucoma, retina, Pediatric Ophthalmology Microbiology laboratory, library, low Vision Rehabilitation Center and Auditorium. The eye care facility which is headquartered in Kakinada, till year 2018 has 11 branches and operates several mobile camps and purchase of state of art equipments like a visual field analyser which is needed to run these facilities costs around Rs 18 lakhs and hence raising funds remains a challenge.

SriKiran offers access to affordable eye care to all regardless of their socio-economic status. To those who attend eye screening camps, SriKiran provides free eye examinations, and if a cataract surgery is recommended, provides free transportation, free surgery with an intraocular lens (IOL), free medications, free accommodation and food while they are in the hospital. The school bus of the Institution is used to ply villagers to the school. The hospital had performed more than 1,37,000 cataract operations with 90% of them free from the year of its inception to the year 2008. The other strengths of SriKiran are its training programs and International Volunteer program. SriKiran has been a leader in setting standards for eye care in the region, and providing training that emphasizes the importance of 'quality care' in delivering eye care services. Till June 2018, eyecare facility had provided free procedures to nearly a quarter million underprivileged patients from the date of its inception 25 years ago. As the organisation completed silver jubilee in the year 2018, Mr.Sankurathri has also released his autobiography, A Ray of Hope, at a function in Ottawa which he feels will motivate youngsters to cope with depression.

SriKiran conducts continuing medical education programs to disseminate current concepts and techniques to local Ophthalmologists. Those programs are organized regularly through visits of volunteer specialists from Canada and the USA.

SriKiran is supported by Canadian International Development Agency, National Program for Control of Blindness (NPCB), Christoffel-Blindenmission (CBM), Sensor Technology Limited, Eye care for the Adirondacks, Eye Foundation of America, District Blindness Control Society (DBCS), Aravind Eye Hospital, University of Ottawa Eye Institute, Wildrose Foundation, Help the Aged Canada, Rotary International, Orbis International, Infosys. The school is also marginally funded by Indian Government, nominally from charities like Help the Aged, partially from strangers of rest of the world like St. Gregory's Catholic School in the Ottawa suburb of Nepean, money raised from bake sales from school kids which totalled approx $14,000 till year 2008, and Dr Chandra's network around the world.

== Spandana ==
Spandana is a disaster relief program started in 1998. As the region is situated on the coast of Bay of Bengal, disasters are frequent due to cyclones and monsoon rains resulting in floods and considerable damage to property. The program provides to displaced persons basic necessities such as food, drinking water, medications while they are in temporary shelters, and utensils, food, clothing and other needs after they return to their homes.

== Awards and recognitions ==
In 2023, Chandra Sekhar Sankurathri was awarded Padma Shri for his significant services in the field of social work.

- 1996- Rotary Club, Pithapuram, AP. India
- 1998- Lions Club, Kakinada, AP. India.
- 1998- Telugu Cultural Society, Houston, Texas, USA.
- 1998- Invited by the World Volunteer Conference, Edmonton, Alberta, Canada.
- 2000- Certificate of Appreciation by TANA Foundation, USA.
- 2002- Best Non-Governmental Organisation award for performing maximum number of cataract surgeries from Government of Andhra Pradesh (17,500 surgeries per year)
- 2003- Best Non-Governmental Organisation award for performing maximum number of cataract surgeries from Government of Andhra Pradesh (17,500 surgeries per year)
- 2004- Received Service above self award from Rotary District 3020, Rotary International
- 2006- Outstanding Community Achievement Award, India Canada Association of the National Capital Region, Ottawa, Ontario, Canada.
- 2006 – Received "Sankalp Tara "Award for rendering service to the needy from Raksha International Foundation.
- 2006 – "Mother Teresa Excellence Award" for meritorious accomplishments by Integrated Council for Socio-economic Progress & Front For National Progress, New Delhi.
- 2007 – Award by the District Collector on the occasion of Republic Day for the dedicated community services provided in East Godavari District.
- 2008 – Awarded "Dedicated Community Service Award" by the District Collector on the eve of Republic Day of India on 26 January 2008.
- 2008 - Felicitated by Sri. Paripurnananda Swamy of Sri Peetham, Kakinada in recognition for the dedicated services rendered to the community.
- 2008 – Selected as CNN hero by CNN international. First Indian ever to receive this honor.
- 2008 – Featured in ETV 2 Margadarsi on 4 22 October 2008.
- 2009 - Selected as "Top 10 Influential Telugu NRIs".
- 2009 – Featured as one among six people making Canada proud by their work
- 2010 – Awarded Hero of the Year by CNN IBN NEWS CHANNEL. See for details https://web.archive.org/web/20140202214648/http://realheroes.com/2010-heroes.php
- 2010 – Felicitated by Rotary International
- 2010 – By Kanchi Kamakoti Seva Foundation, New York, USA for Vision, Courage and Leadership.
- 2010 – Telugu Literary Society of Manitoba & Hindu Society of Manitoba, Winnipeg, Manitoba, Canada in Appreciation of and Gratitude for Tireless Humanitarian Services.
- 2010 - Certificate of recognition by Government of Ontario, Canada for the outstanding contribution to humanity.
- 2011 – Featured in Maa TV program, "Velugu-Veliginchu".
- 2011 – Featured in CBC, Canada as "Ray of light continued".
- 2011 – Honored by Telugu Academy Gurgaon as "Best Social personality".
- 2012 - ASSOCHAM social innovation excellence award for 2011-12
- 2012– Received "Doctor of Laws" degree from Memorial University, Canada.
- 2012 – Silicon Andhra, USA, special recognition in appreciation for the services and contribution towards society & humanity.
- 2012 – The Hindu Society of Manitoba, Canada, for dedicating life to humanitarian work towards the service of less fortunate people.
- 2013 – Awarded "Humanitarian of the Year" by the Indo-Canada Chamber of commerce, Toronto, Ontario, Canada.
- 2013 – Received "Senior Citizen" award by CNN-IBN for the outstanding work.
- 2014 –"Karmaveer Puraskaar" on 27 February held in New Delhi at the austere awards function by International Confederation of NGO's (iCONGO's).
- 2014 – Received "Brand Excellence Award" on "Individual Achievements & Social Responsibilities" from All India Economy Survey Award Council on 20 July 2014 in New Delhi.
- 2019 - Visesha Purasakaram of Ramineni Foundation by Telangana Panchayati Raj and Rural Development Minister Errabelli Dayakar Rao and Ramineni Foundation (USA) chairman Dharma Prabhakar.
