= Eyes and Ears of God: Video Surveillance of Sudan =

- Directed by: Tomo Križnar
- Written by: Tomo Križnar; Maja Weiss
- Produced by: Tomo Križnar; Živa Ozmec
- Edited by: Svetlana Dramlič
- Music by: Igor Leonardi
- Distributed by: YouTube
- Release date: March 21, 2012
- Running time: 95 minutes
- Languages: English; Slovene; Arabic; Zaghawa; Fur; Nuba; Komo; Ganza

Eyes and Ears of God: Video Surveillance of Sudan is a 2012 documentary film by Tomo Križnar and Maja Weiss.

It shows the ethnic Nuba civilians defending themselves with the help of over 400 cameras distributed by himself and Klemen Mihelič, the founder of humanitarian organisation H.O.P.E., to volunteers across the war zones in the Nuba Mountains, Blue Nile, and Darfur, documenting the (North) Sudan military's war crimes against local populations.

== See also ==
- Sri Lanka's Killing Fields, a 2011 documentary film
- Darfur Now, a 2007 documentary film
- Nuba Conversations, a 2000 documentary film
