= Kafi's Story =

Documentary film about Nuba ethnic group in Sudan

- Directed by: Amy Hardie; Arthur Howes
- Written by: Amy Hardie; Arthur Howes
- Edited by: Arthur Howes
- Production companies: N.F.T.S, Station Road
- Distributed by: Marfilmes
- Release date: 1989
- Running time: 54 minutes
- Country: United Kingdom
- Language: Nuba
- Budget: £20,000

Kafi's Story is an ethnographic film about life of Nuba ethnic people in Sudan, directed by Amy Hardie and Arthur Howes.

== Synopsis ==
Shot between 1986 and 1988, Kafi's Story captures scenes from the life of Nuba peoples just before they were involved in the Second Sudanese Civil War.

Kafi, a young man from the Torogi village in the Nuba Mountains in Sudan, is one of the first men to travel north to the capital Khartoum in search of money. Having money is the only way for him to get a dress and to marry a second wife, Tete.

Ten years after this film, Arthur Howes went back to Sudan to shoot the documentary Nuba Conversations, where he wanted to capture the life of Nuba peoples during the war.

== Festivals ==
- Melbourne International Film Festival, Australia (2000)

== Awards ==
- Joris Ivens Award (third place) of IDFA - International Documentary Film Festival Amsterdam, the Netherlands (1989)
- Documentary Award at BBC BP Expo Documentary, England (1990)
- Basil Wright Prize of R.A.I. International Festival of Etnographic Films, England (1990)
- American Visual Anthropology Award (2000)

== Bibliography ==
- Loizos, Peter, Sudanese Engagements: Three Films by Arthur Howes (1950–2004), Routledge, 2006
