= Tomo Križnar =

Slovenian activist (born 1954)

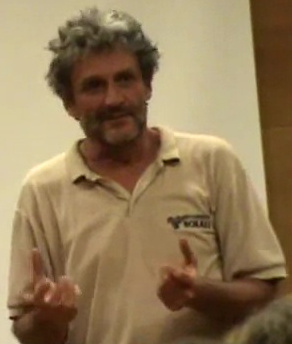

Tomo Križnar (born 26 August 1954) is a peace activist, notable for delivering video cameras in Southern Kordofan to the local ethnic Nuba civilians in order to help them collect the evidence of North Sudan military's war crimes against them. He wrote several books. He was also a special envoy of then Slovenian president Janez Drnovšek for Darfur.

== Private life ==
Born in Jesenice, Jesenice (SR Slovenia, SFR Yugoslavia), he lived in Naklo in northwestern Slovenia. He studied economic sciences and mechanical engineering. Now he and his wife live in Postojna.

== Peace missions ==
=== 2006 Darfur mission ===
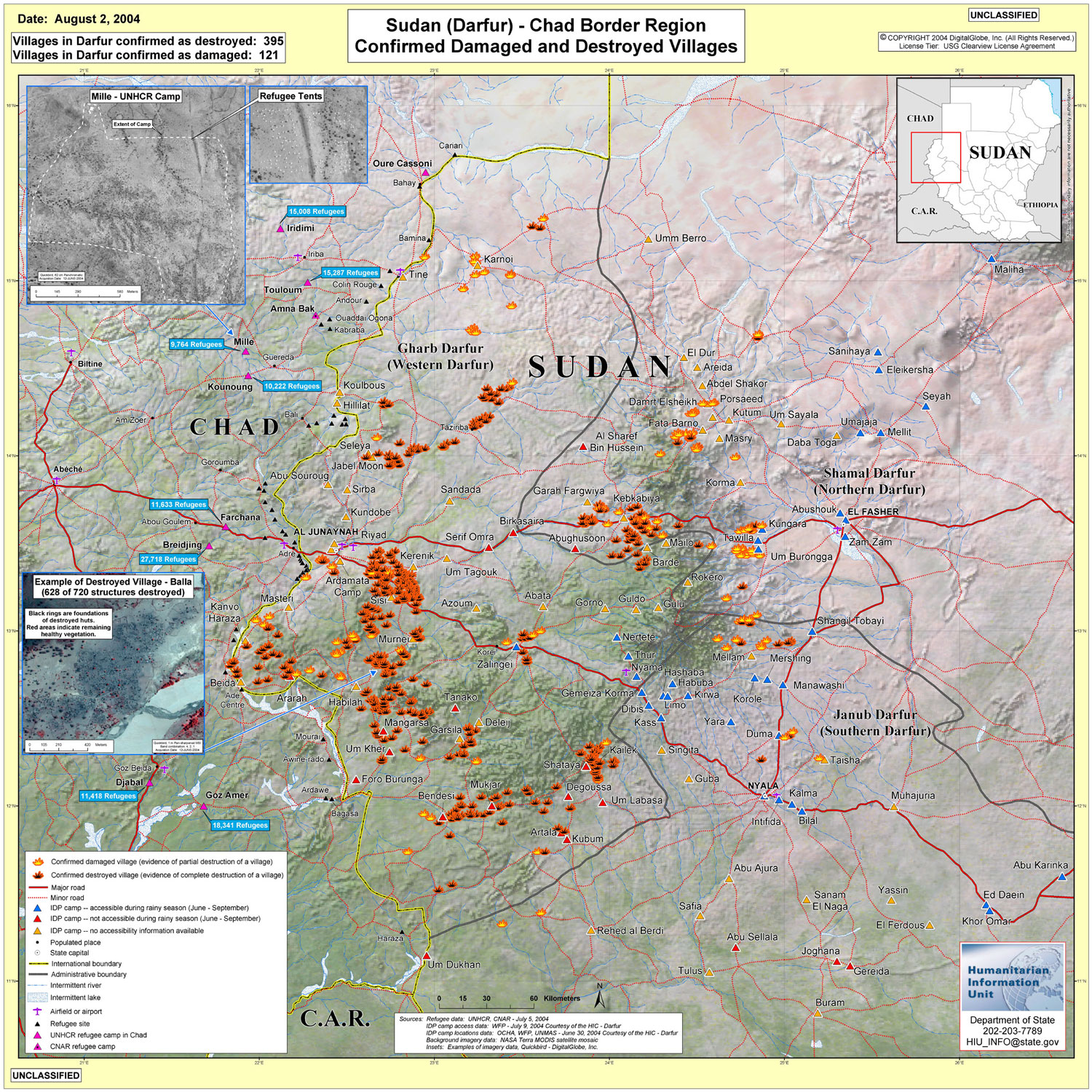
Destroyed villages as of August 2004 (Source: DigitalGlobe, Inc. and Department of State via USAID)

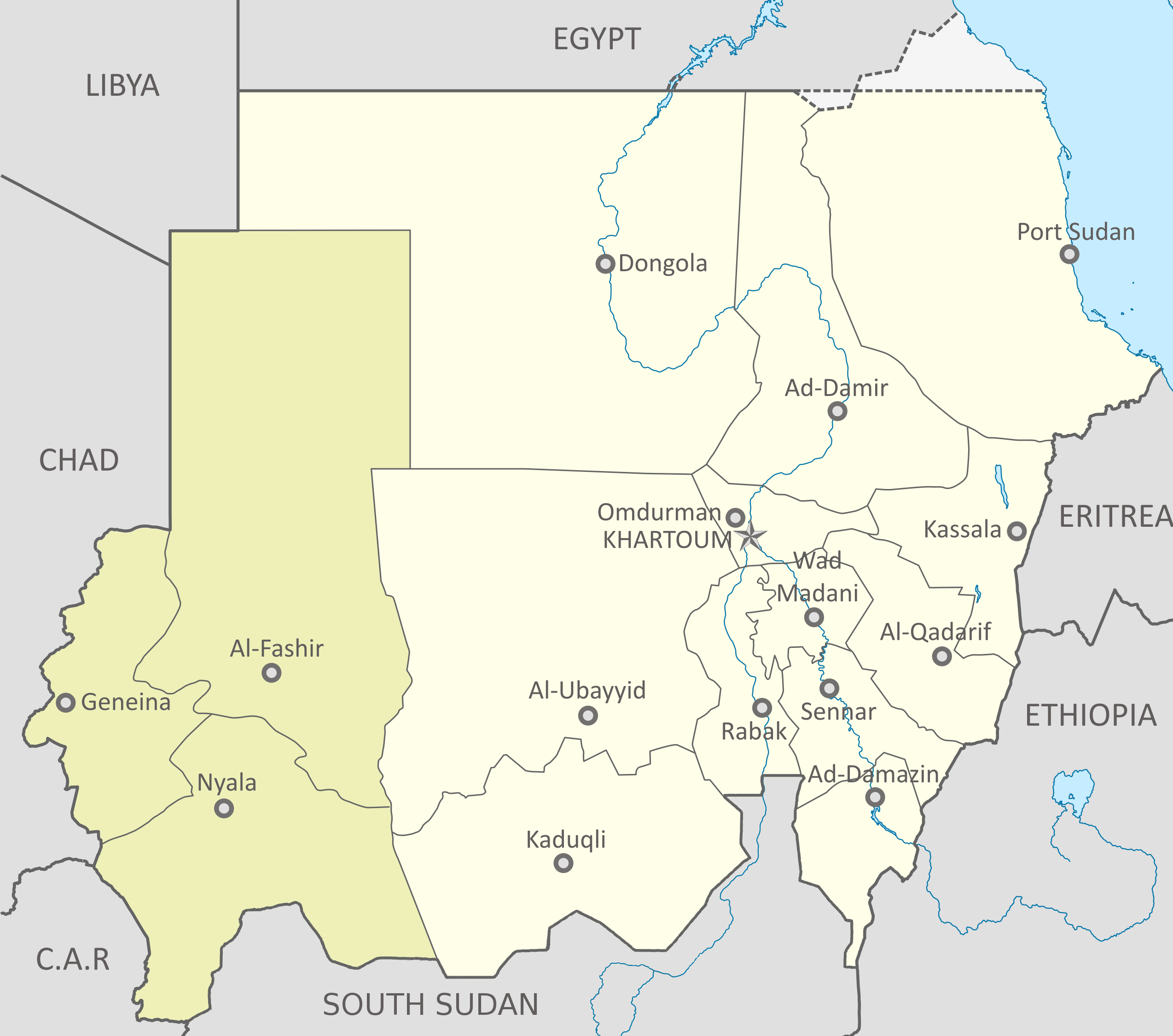

In 2006, Križnar entered the Darfur region with the help of Darfur rebels during the War in Darfur. He entered without a valid visa via the neighbouring Chad. On 20 July 2006, he was arrested. On 14 August 2006, he was convicted of "publishing false news, espionage and entering Sudan without an entry visa" and the criminal court of Al-Fashir in Northern Darfur sentenced him for two years imprisonment and a fine of 500,000 dinars (US$2,400). His photography equipment and films were confiscated.

The Slovene government urged Sudan to pardon Križnar. Then president of Slovenia, Janez Drnovšek, addressed a special letter to Omar Hasan Ahmad al-Bashir and sent another special envoy to Sudan. On 2 September 2006, al-Bashir agreed to pardon and release Tomo Križnar. Križnar returned to Slovenia on 5 September; but he had to leave photography equipment and films – that contain documentations of mass graves according to him – in Sudan.

=== 2011 Southern Kordofan mission ===
In 2011, Križnar delivered video cameras in Southern Kordofan to the local ethnic Nuba civilians in order to help them collect the evidence of North Sudan military's war crimes against them.

In 2012, world premiere of the Eyes and Ears Of God – Video surveillance of Sudan film on YouTube. The documentary film shows the ethnic Nuba civilians defending themselves with the help of over 400 cameras distributed by himself and Klemen Mihelič, the founder of humanitarian organisation H.O.P.E., to volunteers across the war zones in the Nuba Mountains, Blue Nile, and Darfur, documenting the (North) Sudan military's war crimes against local populations. On his website there are quotes from media news about the "refugees in Blue Nile (...) starve highly of no food, medicine and insecurity from the continual aerial bombardment" and "starving families hiding in caves to escape bombing by Sudanese warplanes".

== Documentary films ==
- 2012 Eyes and Ears Of God – Video surveillance of Sudan - available on YouTube
- 2008 DAR FUR - War for Water - available on YouTube
- 2001 Nuba, voices from the other side
- 2000 Nuba, pure people - available on YouTube
- 1995 Lonely paths

== Books ==
Books are in Slovene only.

- 1999 Nuba, pure people
- 1996 Mana, by Bicycle among Indians
- 1994 Lonely paths
- 1993 Shambala - to Tibet by Bicycle
- 1990 On Search for Love or Around the World by Bicycle

== See also ==
- Blue Nile
- Paul Salopek, a (Pulitzer Prize awarded) National Geographic and Chicago Tribune journalist, who was like Tomo Križnar also charged with espionage, passing information illegally, writing "false news," and entering Sudan without a visa

== Sources ==
- Dodging Bombers in Sudan, 22 February, 2012 report from New York Times columnist Nicholas D. Kristof
- "Sudan jails Slovene envoy to two years for "spying"". Sudan Tribune. 15 August 2006. Archived from the original on August 14, 2006. About Tomo Križnar.
- Sudan Tribune of 15 August about Slovenian protests
- "Pressure on Sudanese government". Sudan Tribune. August 16, 2006. Archived from the original on August 16, 2006.
- "Sudan Tribune of 22 August: Further developments; Križnar's arrest as warning to the international community". Sudan Tribune. August 22, 2006. Archived from the original on August 22, 2006.
- "Release of Tomo Križnar". Sudan Tribune. September 3, 2006. Archived from the original on September 3, 2006.
- "Tomo Križnar returns to Slovenia". Sudan Tribune. September 6, 2006. Archived from the original on September 6, 2006.
