= Petanqui =

- Directed by: Yeo Kozoloa
- Produced by: Jean-Louis Koula
- Starring: Sidiki Bakaba; Douta Seck
- Edited by: N'Zue Kouakou
- Production companies: Les Films de la Montagne, O.R.T.N, Ciprofilm
- Distributed by: Marfilmes
- Release date: 1983
- Running time: 108 minutes
- Countries: Ivory Coast; Niger; France
- Language: French

Petanqui (original title: Pétanqui (Le droit à la vie) is a 1983 drama film directed by Yeo Kozoloa.

== Synopsis ==
During the drought, Pétanqui - who is responsible for the distribution of food to the population - enjoys a good life, a nice house, lovers and an official car. His son returns from France with a law degree, and although he does not approve his father's lifestyle, he decides to defend him in court when he is accused of embezzlement.

His defence becomes a strong attack on civil servants and members of government who take advantage of their situation. After all, his father is the lesser evil of a state of generalized corruption in the country.

From the novel 15 ans ça suffit by Amadou Ousmane.

== Bibliografia ==
- Martin, Michael, Cinemas of the Black Diaspora, Wayne State University Press, 1995, p. 165. in
- L'Association des trois mondes, Dictionnaire du cinéma africain, Tome I, Ministère de la coopération et du développement, 1991, p. 132 in
- Stam, Robert; Raengo, Alessandra, Literature and Film, Blackwell Publishing, 2005, p. 307 in

== See also ==
- History of Cinema in Ivory Coast
