= Gito, l'ingrat =

- Directed by: Léonce Ngabo
- Produced by: Jacques Sandoz, Films Production
- Starring: Joseph Kumbela; Marie Bunel; Aoua Sangare; Eric Depreter
- Cinematography: Matthias Kälin
- Edited by: Dominique Roy
- Music by: Pierre-Alain Hofmann
- Distributed by: Marfilmes
- Release date: 1992
- Running time: 87 minutes
- Country: Burundi
- Languages: French; Kirundi

Gito, l'ingrat ([ɡi.to lɛ̃.ɡʁa], "Gito the Ingrate") is a 1992 Burundian comedy film directed by Léonce Ngabo.

== Synopsis ==
Gito is a Burundian student who lives in Paris. When he finishes his studies, he decides to go back to his country and promises his French girlfriend that he will call her when he becomes a minister, something that he is convinced will happen. However, he loses gradually his ambition as he is confronted with the country's reality. He thus starts going out again with his childhood loved one. Nevertheless, he will make the best of a bad deal, with the help of the two women of his life. This is Burundi's first feature film, co-produced with Switzerland and France.

== Festivals ==
- Amakula Kampala International Film Festival, Uganda (1992)
- Jameson Dublin International Film Festival, Ireland (1992)
- London Film Festival, England

== Awards ==
- Oumarou Ganda Prize and Best Actor at FESPACO - Panafrican Film and Television Festival of Ouagadougou, Burkina Faso (1993)
- Air Afrique Prize at African Film Festival, Italy (1993)
- Best film - Jury's prize at Lisboa Film Festival, Portugal (1993)
- Émile Cantillon Prize at Festival International du Film Francophone, Belgium (1992)
- Prix de la Ville d'Amiens do Amiens International Film Festival, France (1992)
- Hani Jahvaria and Press Prizes at Carthage Film Festival, Tunis (1992)

== Bibliography ==
- Russel, Sharon A., Guide to African Cinema, 1998, pp. 68–70
