= Falaba Issa Traoré =

- Born: 1930; Bougouni, Mali
- Died: August 8, 2003 (aged 72–73)
- Occupations: Writer, theatre director, film director, playwright
- Years active: 1930-2003

Falaba Issa Traoré (1930 – August 8, 2003) was a Malian writer, comedian, playwright, and theatre and film director.

== Biography ==
Born in Bougouni, Traoré directed an amateur theater troupe before taking over direction of the regional troupe of Bamako between 1962 and 1968. From 1969 to 1973, he created and directed the Yankadi troupe for folklore and the dramatic arts.

In 1973, he traveled to Germany to study cinema direction. On returning to Mali in 1976, he directed the cinema division of the Ministry of Sports, Arts, and Culture.

As a comedian, Traoré played notable roles in the films of Kalifa Dienta (A Banna), of Cheick Oumar Sissoko (Nidiougou Guimba), and of Boubacar Sidibé (le pacte social, Sanoudié, and N'Tronkélé). He worked also as a director, making his first film, Juguifolo (First Gleam of Hope), in 1979, and his last, Bamunan (The Sacred Pagne) in 1990. Falaba Issa Traoré is the author of the operas Soundiata ou l'épopée mandingue and Dah Monzon ou l'épopée Bambara.

In 1972, Traoré won the prix Afrique de Poésie de la Francophonie.

He died in Rabat, Morocco, on August 8, 2003.

== Filmography ==
- 1979 Juguifolo (First Gleam of Hope)
- 1980 Anbé no don (We Are All Guilty)
- 1980 Kiri Kara Watita (Duel on the Cliffs)
- 1990 Bamunan (The Sacred Pagne).

== Bibliography ==
- 1970 Contes et récits du terroir
