= Bamunan =

- Directed by: Falaba Issa Traoré
- Written by: Falaba Issa Traoré
- Produced by: Falaba's Films
- Starring: Mamadou Doumbia; Maîmouna Kone; Marietou Kouyaté; Ibrahima Sory Togola
- Cinematography: Benoit Say Kan N'da
- Edited by: Ahoussy Diangoye, Koffi Kouabran
- Distributed by: Marfilmes
- Release date: 1990
- Running time: 103 minutes
- Country: Mali
- Language: Bambara language

Bamunan is a 1990 drama film directed by Falaba Issa Traoré.

== Synopsis ==
Daily life scenes in a rural village of Mali: harvest, meddlesomeness, children games, a wedding, a theft, and the clumsy intervention of the police. The character that brings all these scenes together is a leper despised by the whole village, who manages to be cured in the city and happily returns to his people.

== Awards ==
- Best Actress (Mariatou Kouyaté) at FESPACO - Panafrican Film and Television Festival of Ouagadougou, Burkina Faso (1991)

== See also ==
- Falaba Issa Traoré
- Cinema of Mali
- Bamunai
