= Nuba Conversations =

2000 film by Arthur Howes

- Directed by: Arthur Howes
- Written by: Arthur Howes
- Produced by: Arthur Howes
- Edited by: Arthur Howes
- Distributed by: Marfilmes
- Release date: 2000
- Running time: 56 minutes
- Countries: Sudan; United Kingdom
- Language: Nuba
- Budget: £25,000

Nuba Conversations is a 2000 documentary and ethnographic film directed by Arthur Howes.

== Synopsis ==
Ten years after shooting Kafi's Story, British filmmaker Arthur Howes clandestinely reentered Sudan to find out what had happened to the Nuba people of Torogi.

He found signs of jihad everywhere. For example, a notable television program, Fields of Sacrifice, celebrated that week's casualties in the war against the Nuba and featured family members thanking Allah for taking their sons and brothers as martyrs.

Much of the Nuba population was recruited by the rebel movement Sudan People's Liberation Army during the Second Sudanese Civil War. Others left their homes and now live in refugee camps.

Arthur Howes brought his earlier documentary, Kafi's Story, and showed it to Nuba people living in a refugee camp in Kenya.

Later on, in 2002, Nuba Conversations was presented at the United Nations headquarters in Nairobi to the parties involved in the conflict. It is believed to have significantly contributed to accelerating the peace process.

== Festivals ==
- Document 2 – International Human Rights Documentary Film Festival, U.K. (2004)
- Venice Film Festival, Italy (2000)
- Pan-African Film Festival, U.S.A.(2000)
- Paris Documentary Film Festival, France (2000)
- Festival Internacional de Documentários, Brazil

== See also ==
- Sri Lanka's Killing Fields, a 2011 documentary film.
- Eyes and Ears of God: Video Surveillance of Sudan, a 2012 documentary
- Darfur Now, a 2007 documentary

== Sources ==
- Loizos, Peter, Sudanese Engagements: Three Films by Arthur Howes (1950–2004), Routledge, 2006
