= Luanda, The Music Factory =

Luanda, the Music Factory
- Directed by: Inês Gonçalves; Kiluanje Liberdade
- Written by: Inês Gonçalves; Kiluanje Liberdade
- Cinematography: Inês Gonçalves
- Edited by: Maria Joana Figueiredo
- Music by: Dj Buda; Dj Mal Criado; DJ Bobodji; Mankilas; Mutante
- Production company: Noland Films
- Distributed by: Marfilmes
- Release date: 2009
- Running time: 54 minutes
- Countries: Angola; Portugal
- Languages: Portuguese; Kimbundu

Luanda, the Music Factory (original title: Luanda, a Fábrica da Música is a 2009 documentary film about Kuduro directed by Inês Gonçalves and Kiluanje Liberdade.

== Synopsis ==
In the middle of a Luanda slum (musseque), DJ Buda owns a recording studio, giving the opportunity to young singers to express themselves. Rhyming at Buda's beats, kids shout out all their worries and everyday experiences to his old micro. In the end they dance, laugh and listen to their own work with the inhabitants of the neighbourhood.

== Festivals ==
- DokFest, Germany (2010)
- World Film Festival, Canada (2010)
- Festival de Cine Africano de Córdoba, Spain (2010)
- Play-Doc, Spain (2010)
- Africa in the Picture, The Netherlands (2009)
- DocLisboa, Portugal (2009)
- DokLeipzig, Germany (2009)
- My World Images, Denmark
- Centre for African Culture, Norway

== Bibliography ==
- Alisch, Stefanie; Siegert, Nadine, Angolanidade revisited – Kuduro, ACADEMIC, 6-June-2011, available in
