= Sarada Vidyalayam =

Sarada Vidyalayam School
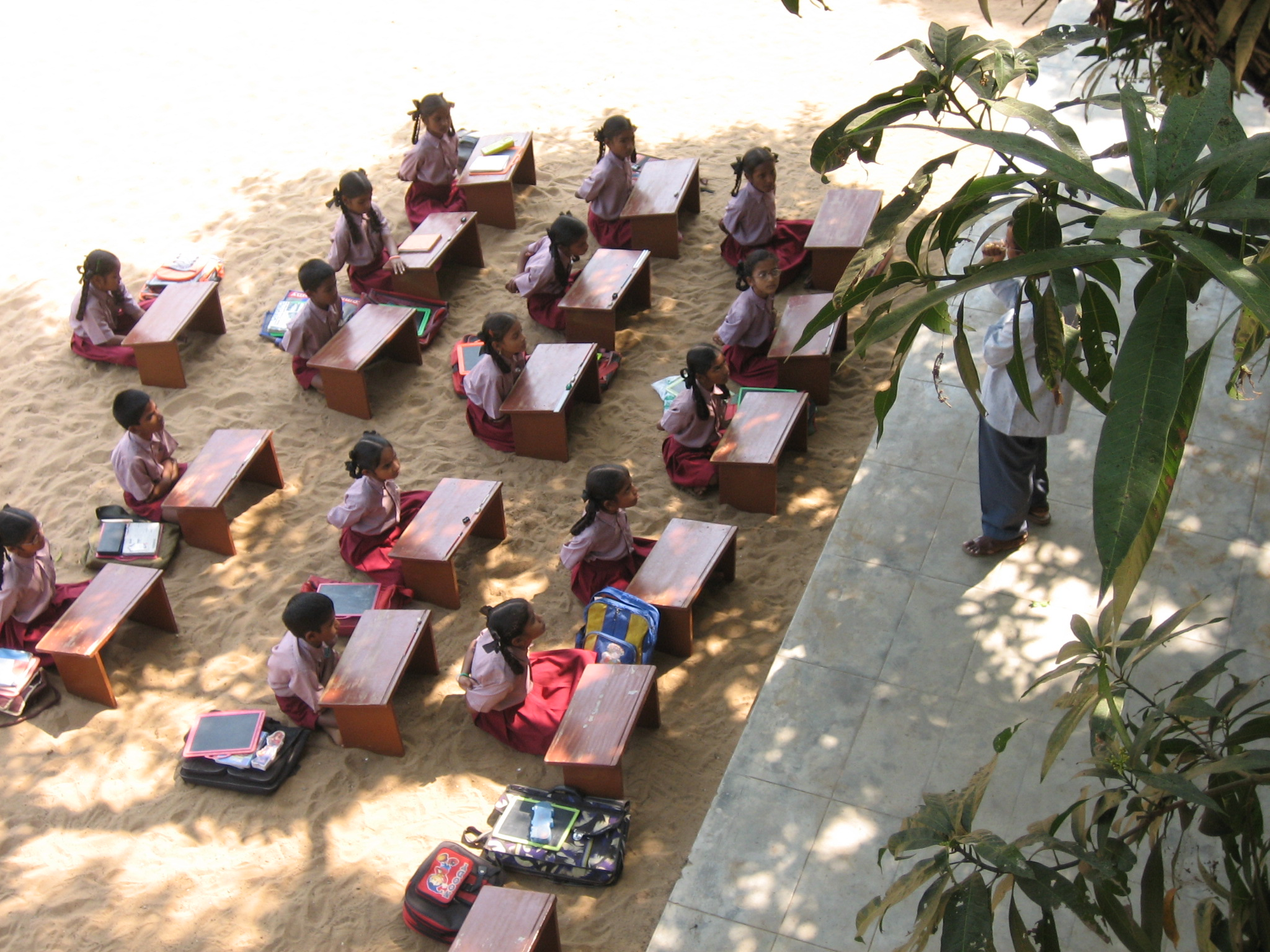
- Kakinada, Andhra Pradesh; India

Information
- Established: 14 July 1992
- Staff: 4
- Faculty: 16
- Grades: 1-10
- Enrollment: 150
- Website: sankurathri.org

Sarada Vidyalayam is a multi-grade school founded on 14 July 1992 by Padma Shri Dr. Chandra Sekhar Sankurathri. It was founded with the objective of providing free education to children in the rural areas of Kakinada, India to combat the oft-common illiteracy in the region's impoverished families. The school is funded by charitable donations raised by Dr. Sankurathri and the Sankurathri Foundation and receives no financial assistance from the Indian government or the parents of its students.

== Teaching ==
While the school follows the state syllabus, the teaching methodology used is different from the methods employed in conventional schools. With a student-teacher ratio of less than 10:1, teachers can monitor the progress of each child. Besides providing an education, the school provides free bus transportation for kids who don't live within walking distance.

The school provides a lunch, which for a number of the children is their only meal of the day. The school provides medical and dental checkups (including medicines) and Hepatitis-B vaccinations. Everything from books and schoolbags to uniforms and shoes is provided to students at no charge. The school gives two sets of uniforms to each child.
