= Muna Moto =

1975 Cameroonian drama film

- Directed by: Jean-Pierre Dikongué Pipa
- Written by: Jean-Pierre Dikongué Pipa
- Produced by: Cameroun Spectacles
- Starring: Philippe Abia; Arlette Din Beli; Gisèle Dikongue-Pipa; David Endene
- Cinematography: Jean-Luc Léon; JP Dezalay
- Edited by: Andrée Davanture
- Music by: Georges Anderson
- Distributed by: Marfilmes
- Release date: 1975
- Running time: 89 minutes
- Country: Cameroon
- Languages: French; Duala; Basaa

Muna Moto is a 1975 Cameroonian drama film written and directed by Jean-Pierre Dikongué Pipa.

== Synopsis ==
Ngando and Ndomé are in love. Ngando wishes to marry Ndomé but her family reminds him that the traditional dowry must be settled. Ngando is poor and unable to fulfil the tradition. Ndomé is pregnant and bears his child. According to the village tradition, she must take a husband, at least one who can afford to pay the dowry. The villagers decide that Ndomé should marry Ngando's uncle, who has already three sterile wives. In despair, the young man kidnaps his daughter upon the day of the traditional feast. An African Romeo and Juliet story.

The film is part of the Les Étalons de Yennega 1972-2005 collection, launched by FESPACO and Cinémathèque Afrique.

== Festivals ==
- Amakula Kampala International Film Festival, Uganda (2011)
- 15.º NYAFF - New York African Film Festival, U.S.A. (2008)
- Official Selection Venice Film Festival, Italy (1975)
- São Paulo International Film Festival, Brazil

== Awards ==
- First prize (Étalon de Yennenga) and First Prize International Catholic Organization of Cinema at FESPACO - Panafrican Film and Television Festival of Ouagadougou, Burkina Faso (1976)
- First Prize Festival International du Film de l'Ensemble Francophone, Switzerland (1975)
- Silver Tanit at Journées cinématographiques de Carthage, Tunis (1976)
- George Sadoul Prize, France (1975)

== See also ==
- Jean Pierre Dikongue-Pipa
- History of Cinema in Cameroon
- Article (in Portuguese in Cinefrance
