= War over Water =

War over Water usually means Water conflict. It may also refer to the following:

== Conflicts ==
- War over Water (Bolivia) - also known as the 2000 Cochabamba protests
- War over Water (Jordan river) - tensions between Israel and the Arab League in late 1960s over water supply from Jordan river basin
- California Water Wars - were a series of conflicts between the city of Los Angeles, farmers and ranchers in the Owens Valley of Eastern California, and environmentalists
- Water wars in Florida - water crisis in Florida
- Tri-state water dispute - is a water use conflict between the states of Georgia, Alabama, and Florida over the Apalachicola-Chattahoochee-Flint River Basin and the Alabama-Coosa-Tallapoosa River Basin

== Art ==
- The Water War - is a documentary movie about the Water conflict in Mozambique
