= Arthur Howes =

British documentarian (1950–2004)

Arthur Joseph Christopher Howes
- Born: 15 July 1950; Gibraltar, United Kingdom
- Died: 29 November 2004 (aged 54); London, United Kingdom
- Notable work: Kafi's Story (1989); Nuba Conversations (2000); Benjamin and His Brother (2002)

Arthur Howes (15 July 1950 – 29 November 2004) was a British documentary film maker and teacher.

== Life ==
Howes was born in Gibraltar on 15 July 1950, and moved to London as a teenager. He was married to Amy Hardie and had one son. He died from lung cancer in London on 29 November 2004, aged 54.

== Career ==
Howes studied teaching, then film-making at the Polytechnic of Central London. He went on to have a long career in documentary film-making and was particularly known for a trilogy about the Sudanese civil war. He also taught during his career at University of Essex and the London College of Printing. At this time of his death he was working on a film Bacchanalias Bahianas 1–5 which was left unfinished. He had worked on this film in Brazil and it focussed on beach culture in Bahia.

== Sudanese films ==
- Kafi's Story (1989)
- Nuba Conversations (2000)
- Benjamin and his Brother (2002)
