= Theatre of the Oppressed =

Theatrical genre

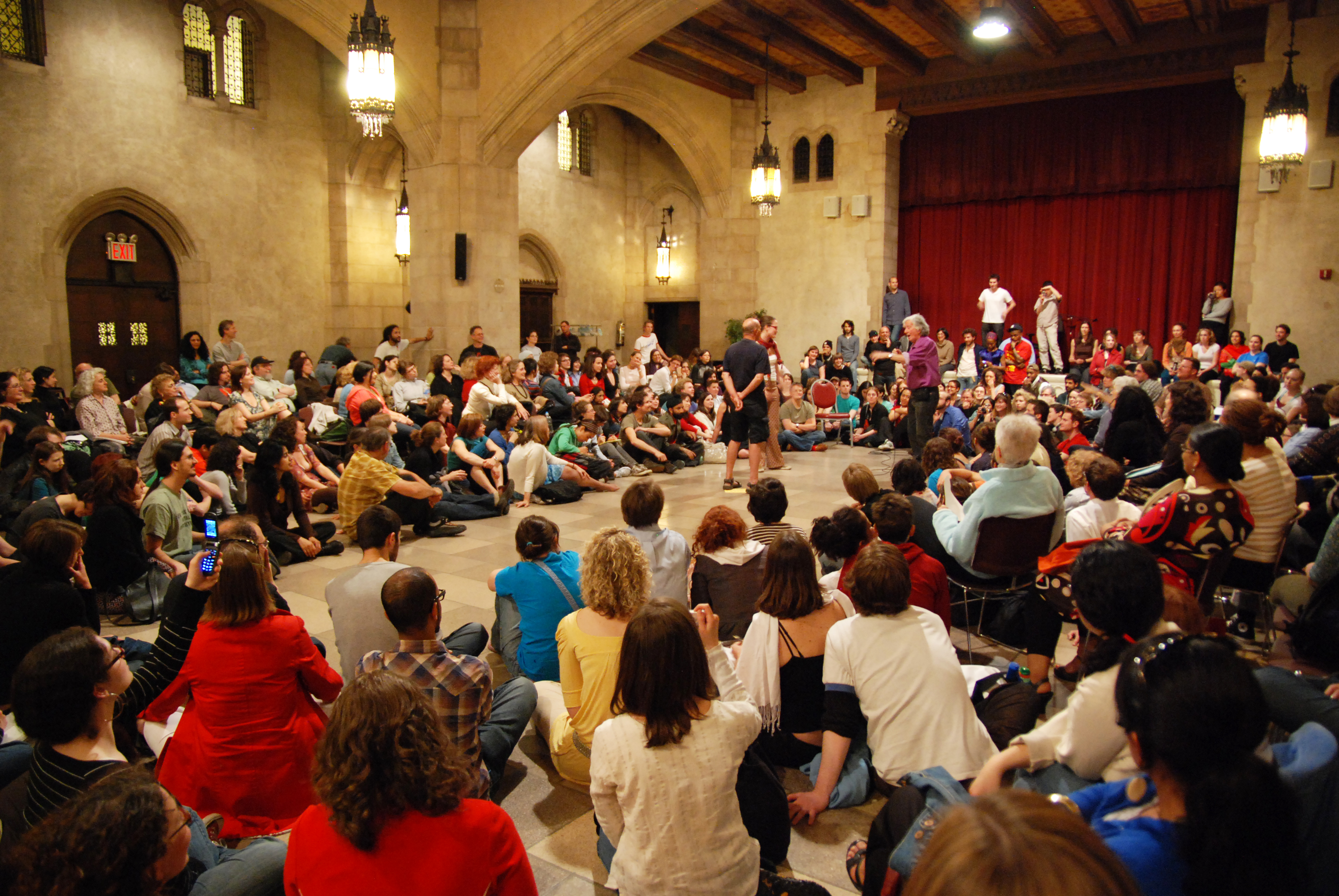
Augusto Boal presenting a workshop on the Theatre of the Oppressed at Riverside Church in New York City in 2008

The Theatre of the Oppressed (TO) describes theatrical forms that the Brazilian theatre practitioner Augusto Boal first elaborated in the 1970s, initially in Brazil and later in Europe. Boal was influenced by the work of the educator and theorist Paulo Freire and his book Pedagogy of the Oppressed. Boal's techniques use theatre as means of promoting social and political change in alignment originally with radical-left politics and later with centre-left ideology. In the Theatre of the Oppressed, the audience becomes active, such that as "spect-actors" they explore, show, analyse and transform the reality in which they are living.

== History ==
Although it was first officially adopted in the 1970s, Theatre of the Oppressed, a term coined by Augusto Boal, is a series of theatrical analyses and critiques first developed in the 1950s. Boal was an avid supporter of using interactive techniques, especially in the context of theatre. Many of his ideas are considered as "a new media perspective", despite the relatively early birth of these ideas. Since then, these ideas have been developed more, giving them meaning in a modern-day context. The creation of the Theatre of the Oppressed is largely based on the idea of dialogue and interaction between audience and performer. Moreover, these ideas have served as a framework for the development and evolution of stronger ideas.

== Spect-actor ==
Boal emphasizes the critical need to prevent the isolation of the audience. The term "spectator" brands the participants as less than human; hence, it's necessary to humanize them, to restore to them their capacity for action in all its fullness. They must also be a subject, an actor on equal plane with those accepted as actors, who in turn must also be spectators. This will eliminate any notions of the ruling class and the theatre solely portraying their ideals while the audience members are the passive victims of those images. This way the spectators no longer delegate power to the characters either to think or act in their place. They free themselves; they think and act for themselves. Boal supports the idea that theatre is not revolutionary in itself but is rehearsal of revolution. (Wardrip-Fruin, 352)

== Major branches ==
During the development of Theatre of the Oppressed, Boal worked with many populations and tried many techniques. These techniques eventually coalesced into different theatrical styles, each using a different process to achieve a different result. Boal often organized these theatrical systems as a tree, with images, sounds and words as the roots, games, Image Theatre and Forum Theatre ascending up the trunk, and then other techniques represented as limbs stemming from these. As more TO systems evolved, Boal and others have made slight modifications to which techniques appear on various limbs, but the Tree of Theatre of the Oppressed has mostly remained consistent:

=== Image theatre ===
Image theatre is a performance technique in which one person, acting as a sculptor, moulds one or more people acting as statues, using only touch and resisting the use of words or mirror-image modelling. Boal claims this form of theatre to be one of the most stimulating because of its ease of enactment and its remarkable capacity of portraying thought in a concrete form due to the absence of language idiom. Each word has a denotation common for all as well as a connotation that is unique for each individual. Each will have his own interpretation of "revolution", and to demonstrate such idea provides a clearer understanding of their intention in definition when shown rather than told. (Wardrip-Fruin, 344). For instance, one can "embrace" another in many ways (in a tight, harassing manner or a loose soft manner), however the word has the same definition of clasping another person in the arms.

=== Forum theatre ===
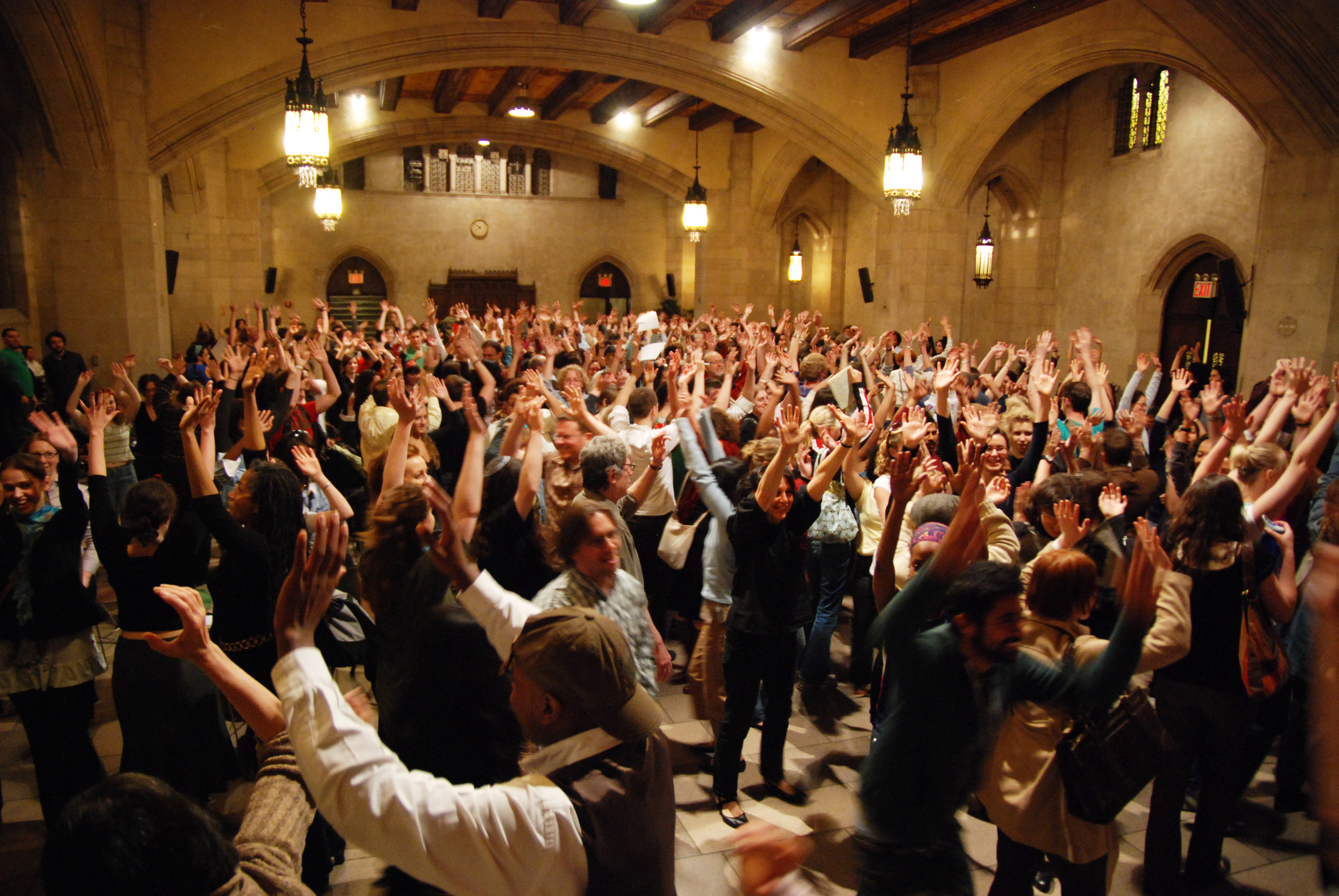
Participants in a workshop on the Theatre of the Oppressed in New York City. Riverside Church, May 13, 2008.

While practicing in South America earlier in his career, Boal would apply "simultaneous dramaturgy". In this process, the actors or audience members could stop a performance, often a short scene in which a character was being oppressed in some way (for example, a typically male chauvinist man mistreating a woman or a factory owner mistreating an employee). In early forms of "simultaneous dramaturgy", the audience could propose any solution, by calling out suggestions to the actors who would improvise the changes on stage.

Forum Theatre was essentially born from "simultaneous dramaturgy". The concept of the "spect-actor" became a dominant force within and shaped Boal's theatre work, gradually helping it shift into what he called Forum Theatre (due to the acting's taking on the character of a public discussion or series of proposals, only in dramatic format). The audience were now encouraged to not only imagine change but to actually practise that change, by coming on stage as "spect-actors" to replace the protagonist and act out an intervention to "break the oppression". Through this process, the participant is also able to realize and experience the challenges of achieving the improvements he/she suggested (Wardrip-Fruin, 344).

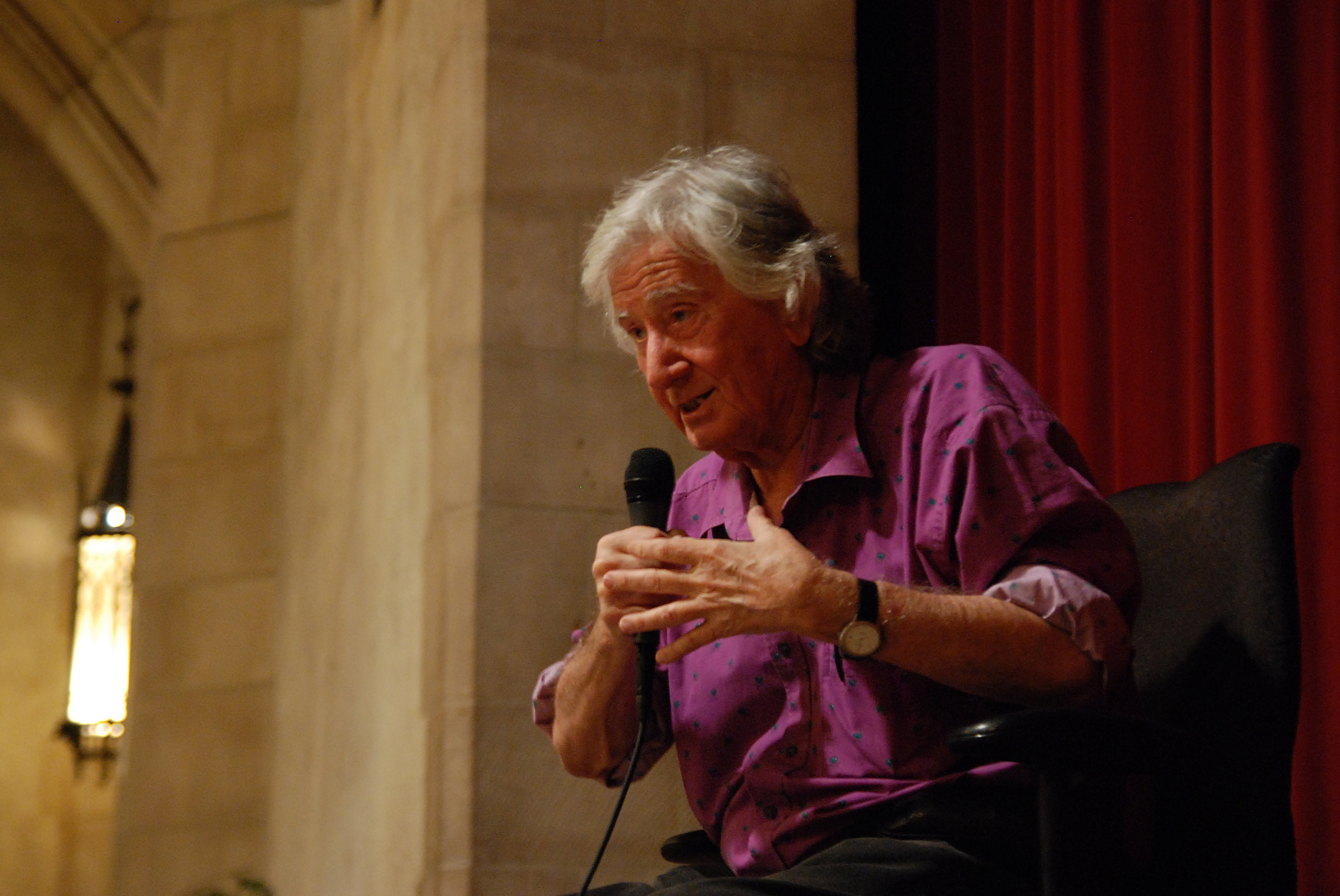
Augusto Boal presenting a workshop on the Theatre of the Oppressed in New York City. Riverside Church, May 13, 2008.

Boal clarifies that this practice is not intended to show the correct path, but rather to discover all possible paths which may be further examined. The theatre itself is not revolutionary; but it offers a chance to rehearse for revolution. The spectators learn much from the enactment even though the acting is fiction, because the fiction simulates real-life situations, problems, and solutions. It stimulates the practice of resistance to oppression in reality, and offers a "safe space" for practicing making change. When faced in reality with a similar situation they've rehearsed in theatre, participants who have experienced Forum Theatre ideally will desire to be proactive, and will have the courage to break oppressive situations in real life, since they feel much more prepared and confident in resolving the conflict. Another way of thinking about it is that rehearsing the actions helps spect-actors to develop their own courage and makes them desire action for change in real life. The practice of this form creates an uneasy sense of incompleteness that seeks fulfillment through real action. (Wardrip-Fruin, 346)

=== Newspaper theatre ===
A system of techniques devised to give the audience a way to transform daily news articles or any non-dramatic pieces to theatrical scene. The strategies are as follows (Wardrip-Fruin, 346):

- Simple Reading: news item read, detached from the context of the newspaper (which makes it false or controversial).
- Crossed Reading: two news item are read in alternating form, complementing or contrasting each other in a new dimension.
- Complementary Reading: information generally omitted by the ruling class is added to the news.
- Rhythmical Reading: article is read to a rhythm (musical), so it acts as a critical "filter" of the news, revealing the true content initially concealed in the newspaper.
- Parallel Action: actors mimic the actions as the news is being read. One hears the news and watches its visual complement.
- Improvisation: news is improvised on stage to exploit all its variants and possibilities.
- Historical: data recurred from historical moments, events in other countries, or in social systems are added to the news.
- Reinforcement: article is read accompanied by songs, slides, or publicity materials.
- Concretion of the Abstract: abstract content in news is made concrete on stage, i.e. hunger, unemployment, etc.
- Text out of Context: news is presented out of context in which it was originally published.

=== Rainbow of Desire ===
Rainbow of Desire is a technique and also a family of techniques explained by Boal in his book of the same name. Rainbow techniques stem from Image theatre and tend to focus on forms of internalized oppression played out by a protagonist in relation to an antagonist. While in his earlier work Boal eschewed the use of Theatre of the Oppressed as "drama therapy", he later began to espouse these more introspective techniques as a form of "theatre and therapy".

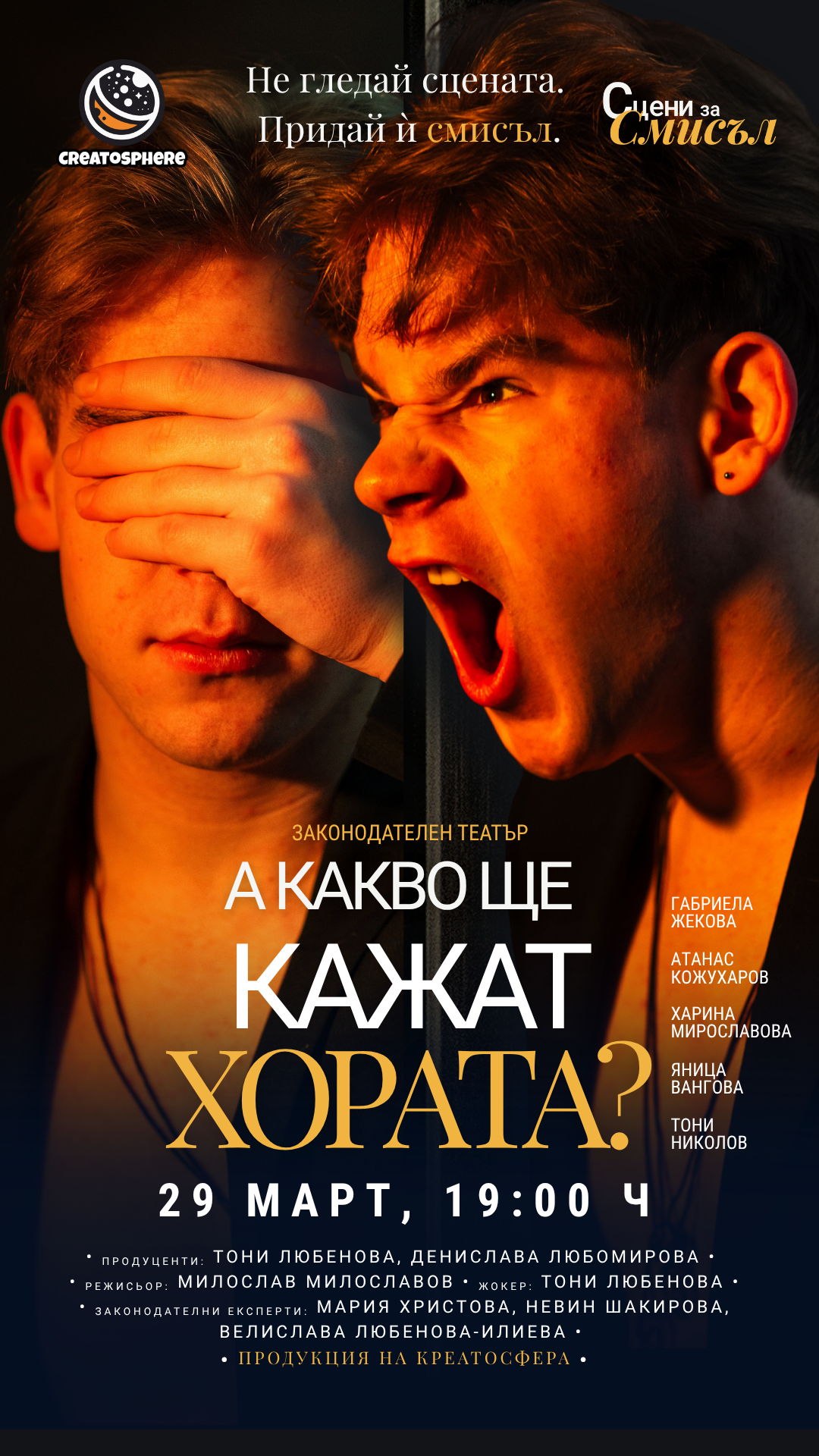
Poster for А какво ще кажат хората? (“And What Will People Say?”), a Legislative Theatre performance presented within the Scenes of Meaning project in Sofia on 29 March 2026. Poster design and photography by Eve Enfer; model: Arthur Enfer.

=== Legislative theatre ===
During Boal's time as vereador (alderman) for Rio de Janeiro, he created a new form of theatre called "legislative theatre" to give his voters the opportunity to voice their opinions. The objective is to open up a dialogue between citizens and institutional entities so that there is a flow of power between both groups. Boal calls this type of legislative process a "transitive democracy", which lies in between direct democracy (practiced in ancient Greece) and delegate democracy. It is similar to forum theatre; however, the subject of the production is based on a proposed law to be passed. Spect-actors may take the stage and express their opinions, thereby helping with the creation of new laws. Some 13 laws were created through legislative theatre during Boal's time in government. The technique has since been used overseas in countries including Canada and the United Kingdom.

In 2026, a series of legislative theatre performances were organized in Sofia, Bulgaria, at the City Mark Art Center Theater, as part of the project “Сцени за смисъл” (“Scenes for Meaning”), co-funded by the Erasmus+ Programme and the Bulgarian Human resource development center, organized by the Bulgarian Creatosphere association. The representations addressed the topics of domestic violence, marginalized communities and mental health. The performances followed a structured participatory format based on Boal’s methodology. Audience members were invited by the facilitator, the "Joker", to intervene in staged scenes derived from real-life situations by suggesting alternative actions or entering the stage. Contributions from the audience were documented and collected by legal experts and the initiative was featured on national television.

The performances were piloted in January in Shumen, Bulgaria, as part of Act of Change, by the Creatosphere association. The project brought together 24 youth workers, facilitators and community educators from eight European countries for a seven-day training course in Legislative Theatre. The training culminated in a public performance at the Vasil Drumev Drama and Puppet Theatre of Shumen, developed around issues identified as affecting the local community, such as youth outmigration, limitations of formal education and civic disengagement. Audience members were invited to intervene in the scenes, with simultaneous interpretation from English to Bulgarian. The initiative also attracted local media attention, with representatives of TV Shumen and Radio Shumen attending the rehearsals and reporting on the project.

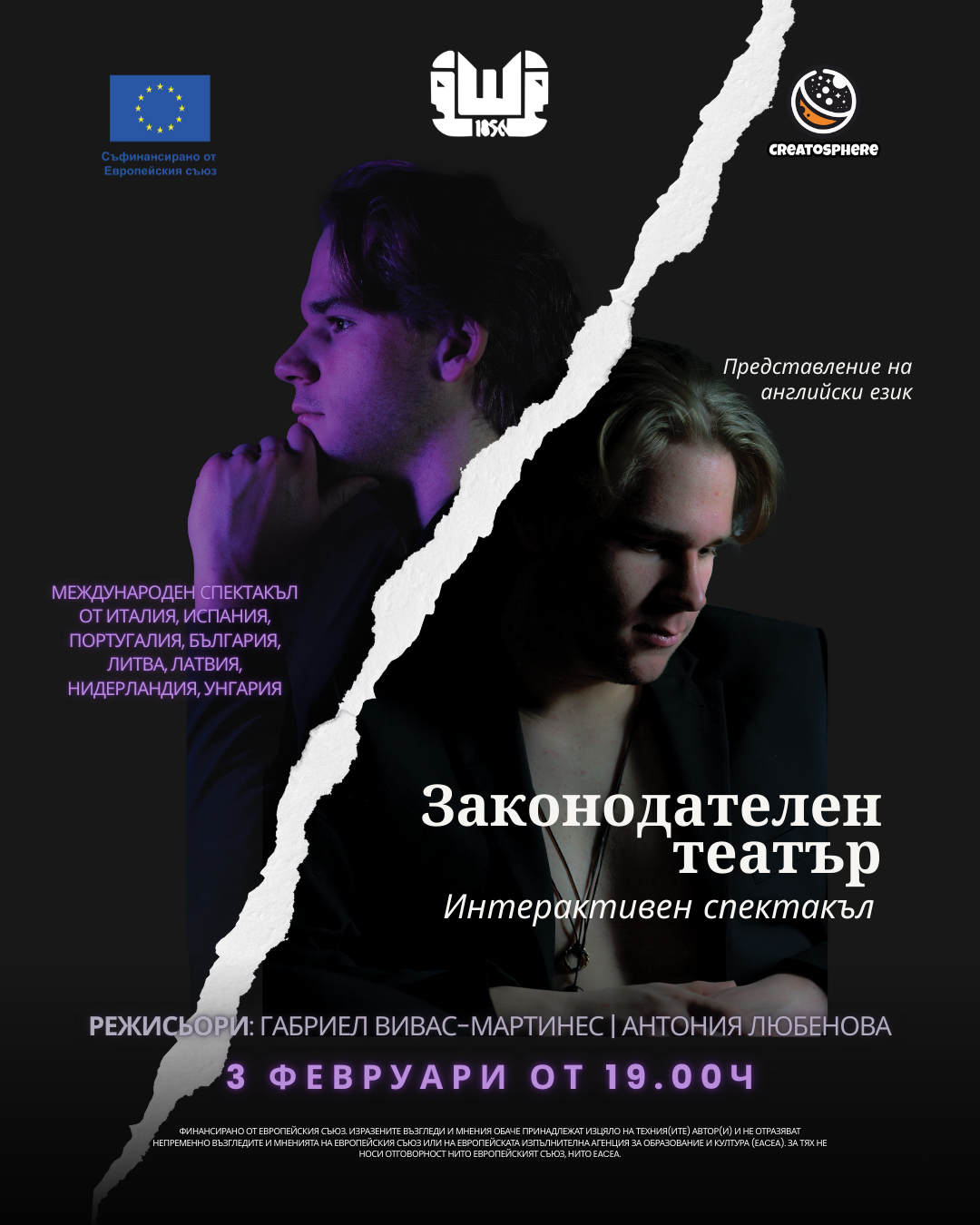
Poster for the Act of Change Legislative Theatre performance. Poster design and photography by Eve Enfer; model: Arthur Enfer.

== Other techniques ==
=== Analytical theatre ===
A story is told by one of the participants and immediately the actors improvise it. Afterward each character is broken down into their social roles and the participants are asked to choose a physical object to symbolize each role. For instance for one community the symbol for the head of the family may be a piggy bank, since that individual is the one who controls the finances (power). Having analysed the characters, a fresh attempt to tell the story is made, however this time removing some of the symbols from each character, and consequently some social roles as well. For example, the story would be perceived differently if the robber had the police uniform and the hostage possessed a revolver. Through this method, the participants will realize that human actions are not the exclusive and primitive result of human psychology; the individual speaks of their class as well. (Wardrip-Fruin, 351)

=== Breaking repression ===
Boal says that the technique of breaking repression involves asking the participant to remember a particular moment when they felt especially repressed, accepted it, and submitted to act in a manner contrary to their own desires. It is necessary, he explains, that the choice is a particular incident rather than a general sense of oppression. The participant describes that incident, which is then reconstructed and re-enacted with other participants of their choosing. This performance is repeated, except that this time the repressed is asked to fight to impose their will while the others involved are invited to maintain the repression.

The conflict that results helps to measure the possibility one has to resist in situations where one fails to do so, as well as to measure the true strength of the enemy. Having rehearsed a resistance to oppression prepares the individual to resist effectively in similar situations that may be encountered in the future. (Wardrip-Fruin, 349)

Boal states that the process to be realized in doing this type of theatre is the one that ascends from the phenomenon toward the law; from the phenomena presented in the plot toward the social laws that govern those phenomena. (Wardrip-Fruin, 349)

=== Photo-romance ===
Photo-romance is a romantic narrative illustrated with sequential photographs in the style of a comic strip, usually published in magazines and such. The technique involves introducing to the participants the general plot without revealing the source of the photo-romance. Then, the participants are asked to act out the story, which is then compared to the actual story as described in the source. The differences are discussed thereafter.

A particular story interpreted and acted out may be a predictable, pathetic one; however, at the same time, this result serves as ideological insight. Boal argues that if they first act out the story themselves then afterwards read the original version, the participants will no longer assume a passive, expectant attitude, but instead a critical, comparative one. They will also be prepared to detect the poison infiltrating the pages of those photo-stories, or the comics and other forms of cultural and ideological domination. This technique is also useful to analyse television programmes, a dominant source of poison directed against the people. (Wardrip-Fruin, 349)

=== Rituals and masks ===
This technique attempts to reveal the ideological superstructure of a society in the form of its rituals. "Rituals" in this sense describes the patterns of human relationships and the masks of behaviour that those patterns impose on the participants according to the roles that they play in society. For example: a man goes to a priest to confess his sins; despite the individual identities of the man and priest (i.e. the priest and the parishioner are landlords, the priest is a landlord and the parishioner is a peasant, etc.) the pattern of behaviour will remain the same as other examples of this interaction. This will cause different scenarios to play out even though the confession is the same. Boal argues that this is an extraordinarily rich technique that has many variants: for example, the same ritual may be explored by its participants exchanging masks or it may be enacted by people from different social classes.

== Organizations ==
=== International Theatre of the Oppressed Organisation ===
Inspired by Augusto Boal, the International Theatre of the Oppressed Organisation links other Theatre of the Oppressed groups to one another. The idea is that others will help groups organize themselves and create new centres for Theatres of the Oppressed. There are links to other organizations involved with this projects so anyone can contact anyone else involved. This online organization allows others to share information about the Theatre of the Oppressed.

Boal's ideas have been widely accepted and used by theatre groups in Mozambique after the end of the civil war in 1992 to explain the need for reconciliation and to discuss topics such as avoiding landmines, voting in the first democratic elections and the rights of peasants under the new land law.

Grupo de Teatro dos Oprimidos - Maputo was founded in 2001 after Alvim Cossa spent six months studying theatre methodology in Rio de Janeiro by a grant from the United Nations Educational, Scientific and Cultural Organization. It has presented plays such as O meu marido esta a negar (My Husband is in Denial), documented as a film by Rogério Manjate, which discusses HIV/AIDS avoidance and treatment. This play is presented in public places - markets, schools and businesses - and the public is invited to attend and present their own solutions to the unequal power relations shown in the play. The result is more effective than a lecture in Portuguese or distribution of written material to a largely illiterate population.

=== Jana Sanskriti ===
Jana Sanskriti Centre for Theatre of the Oppressed (JS) was the first organization to adopt TO in India, founded in 1985 by Dr Sanjoy Ganguly out of the Sunderbans in West Bengal. JS is the largest single organization in the Theatre of the Oppressed network, with a membership of over 40,000, consisting of a 'Spectators' Forum' with over 10,000 members, 30 theatre teams, including 9 all-women teams, as well as a record of art and activism addressing health, infrastructure, welfare, education, and social awareness in the region.

The plays of JS find influence both in classical theatre and West Bengal folk theatre traditions, and covering a wide array of issues, including maternal health, illicit liquor, domestic violence and child abuse, not limited to child marriage and child trafficking, as well as 'corruption, dowry, exploitation of workers, hypocrisy and manipulation by political parties'. A study of 'nearly 4,000 households from 35 villages' conducted by the Centre for Studies in Social Sciences (CSSS) found that in villages in which JS were involved women's education was more highly regarded, women played 'a significantly greater role in family and social lives', as well as lower domestic abuse and alcoholism rates, with the report concluding: “Evidence gathered by us show that Jana Sanskriti’s intervention has led to greater voice for the wife in household decision-making, (effected) changes in opinion over what a prototypical ‘good wife’ is, (helped) men and women become more vocal about protests against wrongs in the community, (effected) fall in actual incidents of violence at home and increase in trust in wife by the husband and (parents) wanting more educated brides for their sons,".

==== Dr Sanjoy Ganguly ====
Dr Ganguly attended university where he graduated with a master's degree in political science, he involved himself in politics during his student years, becoming a member of the Communist Party of India's student organization, Students' Federation of India, and participating in activism in the suburbs of Kolkata before becoming disillusioned with 'the functioning of his party' and moving to the South 24 Parganas district in order to reach out to marginalised agricultural workers', going on to found JS despite having no previous experience with theatre and approaching the subject as an extension of his activism.

Dr Ganguly later went on to write a book about the organization titled Jana Sanskriti: Forum Theatre and Democracy in India, described in review as 'an eclectic combination of memoir, personal philosophy, cultural history, and company-project profiles.'.

=== Theatre of the Oppressed New York City ===
Theatre of the Oppressed NYC (TONYC) partners with community members through local non-profit organizations and social justice coalitions, to form theatre troupes. These troupes devise and perform plays based on their challenges confronting economic inequality, racism, and other human rights injustices. After each performance, actors and audiences engage in Forum or Legislative Theatre – with the aim of catalyzing creative change on the individual, community, and political levels. TONYC was founded in 2011 by Katy Rubin, (who trained with Augusto Boal), after returning to New York City, and discovering a lack of "popular theatre" – created and performed by the actual communities facing oppression. Since 2011, TONYC has grown to train communities to facilitate Theatre of the Oppressed independently, and produce more than 60 public performances and workshops a year.

=== Stage Left Productions, Canada ===
While there are a number of groups in Canada that work with Forum Theatre techniques (e.g., Mixed Company Theatre, Branch Out Theatre, Theatre for Living) Stage Left Productions, based in Canmore, Alberta, has been recognized by Augusto Boal as on official Centre for Theatre of the Oppressed since 2005. Stage Left’s mandate is to craft a “professional artist-community collaboration” performance model that will “integrate marginalized people into the creative, artistic, and social life of [the] community by providing safe and accessible space in which they can explore, define, and celebrate their culture; develop confidence, imagination, and artistic expression; contribute to the culture of community in meaningful ways; and express both individual and collective identity.

=== Kuringa Berlin ===
Kuringa is a theatre space and organization dedicated to Theatre of the Oppressed (TO) based in the Wedding neighborhood in Berlin, Germany. The space was founded in 2011 by Bárbara Santos, artistic director, alongside Till Baumann and Christoph Leucht. Bárbara, an artist and activist originally from Brazil, previously served as Coordinator of Center for Theatre of the Oppressed in Rio de Janeiro, working alongside TO creator Augusto Boal since 1986. Bárbara is also the leader of the global feminist Ma(g)dalena International Network, a movement that centers women's stories and uses TO to fight violence against women, and the author of Theatre of the Oppressed -- Roots and Wings: A Theory of Praxis. Kuringa Berlin hosts regular training courses; forum theatre performances; and festivals. Their forum theatre plays often involve music, movement, and visual art - building on the foundations of Aesthetics of the Oppressed.

=== Centre for Community Dialogue and Change ===
Community Dialogue and Change (CCDC) is an organization based in Bengaluru, India which is dedicated to the promotion of Theatre of the Oppressed chiefly in education as well as medical humanities. CCDC has conducted many workshops among diverse population in India as well as abroad.

=== Medical Humanities Group, UCMS ===
Infinite Ability, the disability special-interest-group within the Medical Humanities Group of University College of Medical Sciences (UCMS), Delhi, India and CCDC organized the first ever Theatre of the Oppressed workshop for medical students in Delhi in 2011. Both of these groups are promoting theatre of the oppressed in South Asia.

Sambhaavnaa Institute of Public Policy and Politics

Sambhaavnaa Institute promotes Theatre of the Oppressed using a long term program jokering justice. Jaya Iyer and Zubair Idrisi anchor these workshops along with Mohammad Chappalwala and Fatema C.

=== Creatosphere association, Bulgaria ===
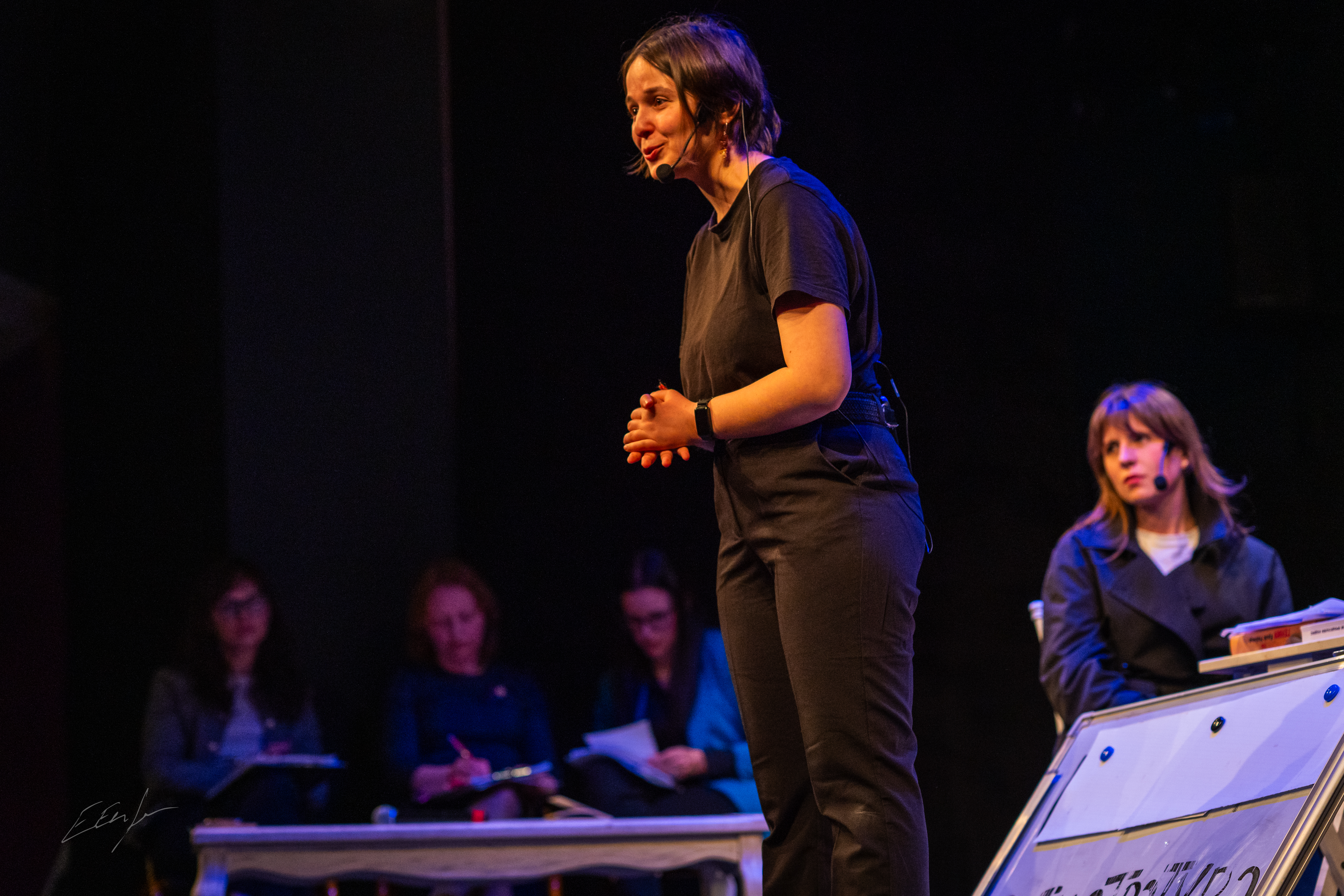
Antoniya “Toni” P. Lyubenova serving as the Joker during the first public Legislative Theatre performance in Sofia, held as part of the Scenes of Meaning project. Legislative experts and a member of the cast are visible in the background.

Creatosphere is a Bulgarian association supporting non-formal education, participatory arts and community-based cultural projects. In 2026, it coordinated the two first Legislative Theatre initiatives in Bulgaria: Act of Change in Shumen and Сцени за смисъл (Scenes of Meaning) in Sofia.

Act of Change was developed and delivered by an international artistic and production team. The performance was directed and facilitated by Antoniya "Toni" P. Lyubenova and dr. Gabriel Vivas-Martínez, with Paía Bauerová as producer, Miglė Tiškevičiūtė as associate producer, Diogo Guerreiro as stage manager, and Eve Enfer responsible for communications, visual materials and video production. The project brought together youth workers, facilitators and community educators from several European countries for training in Legislative Theatre and other Theatre of the Oppressed methods. The training culminated in a public performance at the Vasil Drumev Drama and Puppet Theatre in Shumen, based on issues identified through engagement with local residents. Audience members were invited to intervene in the scenes, test alternative responses and contribute proposals for consideration by local institutions.

Creatosphere subsequently coordinated Scenes of Meaning, a series of public Legislative Theatre performances in Sofia addressing domestic violence, marginalized communities and mental health. Similar to the Shumen project, during the performances, audience members could intervene, propose alternative actions and contribute ideas that were documented and translated into potential legal or policy recommendations. The production team included producers Antoniya "Toni" P. Lyubenova and Denislava Lyubomirova, director Miloslav Miloslavov, and Toni Lyubenova as Joker. The cast included Gabriela Zhekova, Atanas Kozhuharov, Harina Miroslavova, Yanitsa Vanova and Toni Nikolov. Legislative experts Maria Hristova, Nevin Shakirova and Velislava Lyubenova-Ilieva supported the process of documenting and developing audience proposals. Public relations, visual communications and promotional materials for the project were developed by Eve Enfer.

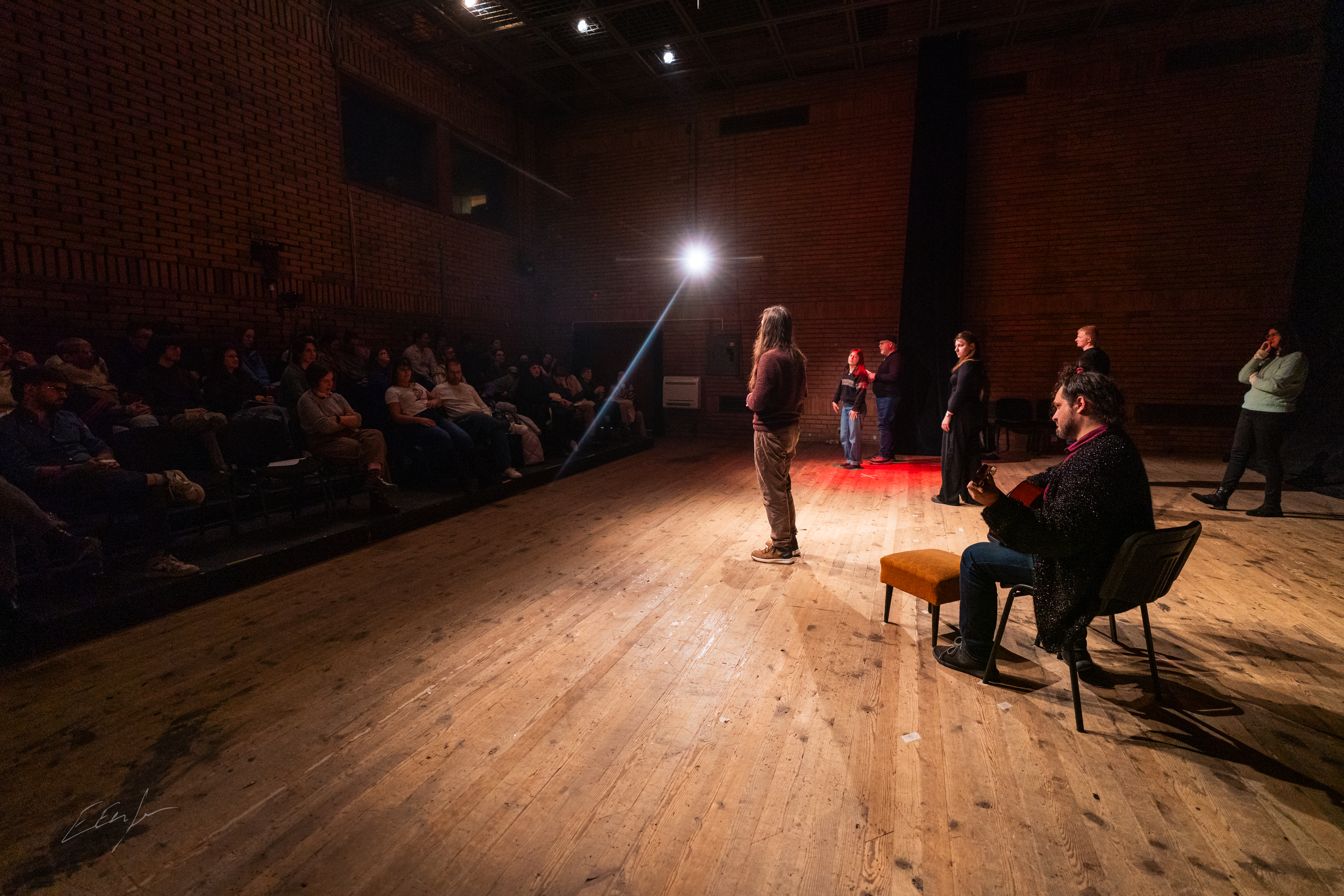
Joker facing the audience during the Act of Change Legislative Theatre performance at the Vasil Drumev Drama and Puppet Theatre in Shumen, 3 February 2026.

== See also ==
- Theatre pedagogy
- Bertolt Brecht
- Lehrstücke
- Cardboard Citizens
- Crowdsourcing
- Jennifer S Hartley
- Playback theatre
