= With What Voice =

- Directed by: Nicholas Oulman
- Produced by: Paulo de Sousa, Beth Calabro Oulman, Leon Edery, Moshe Edery
- Cinematography: Miguel Sales Lopes
- Edited by: Patrícia Saramago
- Music by: Alain Oulman
- Production companies: Glimpse, Dragocom
- Release date: October 16, 2009
- Running time: 108 minutes
- Country: Portugal
- Languages: Portuguese, French, English

With What Voice (original title: Com Que Voz) is a 2009 documentary film directed by Nicholas Oulman.

== Synopsis ==
With What Voice is a documentary on life of Alain Oulman, an important cultural figure during the nineteen-sixties and seventies in Portuguese and French society. The film, shot in Lisbon, Paris and Tel Aviv, features Patricia Highsmith, Amos Oz, Amalia Rodrigues and Mário Soares.

== See also ==
- Fado
