= HelpAge Canada =

Canadian not-for-profit organization

- Company type: Charity
- Founded: 1975
- Headquarters: Canada
- Website: www.helpagecanada.ca

HelpAge Canada (previously known as Help the Aged Canada) is a Canadian not-for-profit organization dedicated to improving the lives of older persons in Canada and around the world.

The organization offers national and global programs in the areas of health, wellness, emergency response, international development, age-friendly transportation, and social inclusion in collaboration with community-based organizations. HelpAge Canada joined the HelpAge International Global Network as a founding member in 1983.

== See also ==
- Respecting Elders: Communities Against Abuse
