= De Corpo e Alma =

- Directed by: Matthieu Bron
- Screenplay by: Matthieu Bron
- Produced by: Meetings Lda
- Cinematography: Matthieu Bron
- Edited by: Matthieu Bron
- Release date: 2010
- Running time: 57 minutes
- Country: Mozambique
- Language: Portuguese

De Corpo e Alma is a 2010 Mozambican documentary film.

== Synopsis ==
The film tells the story of Victoria, Mariana and Vasco, three physically disabled young Mozambicans that live on the outskirts of Maputo. On a daily basis, they must face an endless list of physical, physiological and emotional obstacles that they each find a solution to in their own way by means of work, other activities and their attitude. The film explores the way they see other people and themselves. It poses such universal questions such as accepting oneself and how to find one's place in society.

== Awards ==
- 30th URTI Grand Prix - URTI Grand Prix for Best Documentary, Monaco.
- SIGNIS Commendation Award - Zanzibar International Film Festival, Tanzania.
- Glauber Rocha Award - 38th Jornada Internacional de Cinema da Bahia, Brazil (2011).
- Best Documentary Award: Category Human Rights - Docudays UA, Ukraine.
- Most Influential Film of the Festival Award - Chashama Film Festival, United States of America.

== See also ==
- Cinema of Mozambique
- Cinema of Africa
