= Sudan Tribune =

News portal

- Sudan Tribune logo
- Website type: News
- Owners: Sudan Tribune, LLC
- Website: www.sudantribune.com
- Launched: 2003
- Current status: Active

The Sudan Tribune is an electronic news portal on Sudan and South Sudan and neighbouring countries including news coverage, analyses and commentary, official reports and press releases from various organizations, and maps. It is based in Paris, France, and run by a team of Sudanese and international editors and journalists. The Sudan Tribune claims to have had over 5 million page views in 2005 and more than 12 million page views (almost a million absolute unique visitors) in 2008.

== History ==
The Sudan Tribune was started in 2003. In July 2017, the Sudanese media accused the South Sudanee government of blocking their websites, including that of the Tribune.
