= The Water War =

- Directed by: Licínio Azevedo
- Written by: Licínio Azevedo; Brigitte Bagnol
- Produced by: Ebano Multimedia
- Edited by: Orlando Mesquita
- Music by: Zefanias Mauganhane, Armando Fainda, Alfredo Mbanze
- Distributed by: Marfilmes
- Release date: 1995
- Running time: 73 minutes
- Country: Mozambique
- Languages: Portuguese, Matsua

The Water War is a documentary movie about the Water conflict in Mozambique. It is directed by Licínio Azevedo.

== Festivals ==
- Festival du Réel, France
- Festival dei Popoli, Italy

== Awards ==
- Certificate of Merit, 3rd International Environmental Film Festival South Africa, África do Sul (1997)
- Best production, Southern Africa Communications for Development Award, South Africa (1996)
- Special Jury Mention at International Environmental Film Festival, Germany (1996)
- Special Jury Mention at XXIII Jornada International de cinema e Video da Bahia, Brazil (1996)

== See also ==
- Licínio Azevedo at IMDb
- Water conflict
