= Kalifa Dienta =

Malian filmmaker (born 1940)

- كاليفا دينتا
- Born: Kalifa Dienta; January 1, 1940; Macina, Mali
- Died: June 2021 (aged 80–81); Bamako, Mali
- Occupations: Director, writer, filmmaker
- Years active: 1967–2021
- Children: 3

Kalifa Dienta (Arabic: كاليفا دينتا; January 1940 – June 2021), was a Malian filmmaker. He was best known as the director of the film A Banna. In addition to directing, he was also a writer and cinematographer.

== Personal life ==
He was born on 1 January 1940 in Macina, Mali and died in June 2021 in Bamako, Mali. He studied cinema in Moscow.

== Career ==
In 1980, he directed the film A Banna which received mostly positive reviews from critics and selected in several international film festivals.

== Filmography ==
Year	Film	Role	Genre	Ref.
1980	A Banna	director, writer, cinematographer	feature film	
