= Rogério Manjate =

- Born: April 1972 (age 53–54); Maputo, Mozambique
- Education: Eduardo Mondlane University
- Occupations: Actor, author, filmmaker
- Known for: I Love You

Rogério Manjate (born April 1972) is an actor, theater director and filmmaker from Mozambique, and an author of poetry and fiction.

== Early career ==
Rogério Manjate was born in the Malanga neighborhood of Maputo in April 1972. He grew up there and as of 2002 still lived there. He studied agronomy at Eduardo Mondlane University. From 1991 he was a member of the Mbêu actors group, and from 1992 he was a member of the theater group Mutumbela Gogo, working in both groups until 1995.

== Author and journalist ==
In 2000 Rogério Manjate selected the texts for the book Colectânea Breve de Literatura Moçambicana (Short collection of Mozambican Literature). In 2001 he published a book of stories Amor Silvestre (Wild Love) which won the TDM Literary Prize in 2001. This book includes stories written over a period of several years, short and intense tales of urban and suburban life in contemporary Mozambique, miniatures that cover all aspects of people's lives: their struggles, hopes, tensions and also absurdity.

His first children's book Casa em Flor (Flower House - 2004) won the 2002 FBLP Prize for Children's Literature. His story À Imagem e Semelhança won the 2002 International Short Story prize at the Guimarães Rosa/RFI in Paris. Other publications include Choveria Areia (2005) and Mbila + Dinka (2007). He is a member of the AEMO and has contributed stories and poems to newspapers and magazines. As a journalist, he edited the literary site Maderazinco on the Internet. Manjate was the publisher of the Mozambican Writers Association's magazine Luanova.

== Actor and filmmaker ==
Rogério Manjate played "Pai" in the short mystery movie Tatana (2005). As a filmmaker, Rogério Manjate directed and produced O meu marido esta a negar (My Husband's Denial - 2007), a film about AIDS denial and disclosure. He won the 2008 Durban International Film Festival award for Best Short Film with his short I Love You. I Love You also won the short film prizes at the Africa in Motion (AiM) festival which ran from 23 October to 2 November 2008 in Edinburgh, Scotland and at the African Film Festival of Tarifa (FCAT) in Tarifa, Spain in 2009. This film, which deals with the issue of safe sex, was produced for UNESCO.

Rogério Manjate is director of his own theatre company, Galagalazul, and also acts in this company. He has toured widely with the 2005 play Na Solidão dos Campos de Algodão (In the solitude of the cotton fields). He has said that whether the medium is writing, film or theater, his motive is always the joy of storytelling.
