= Jean-Pierre Dikongué Pipa =

Cameroonian film director and writer

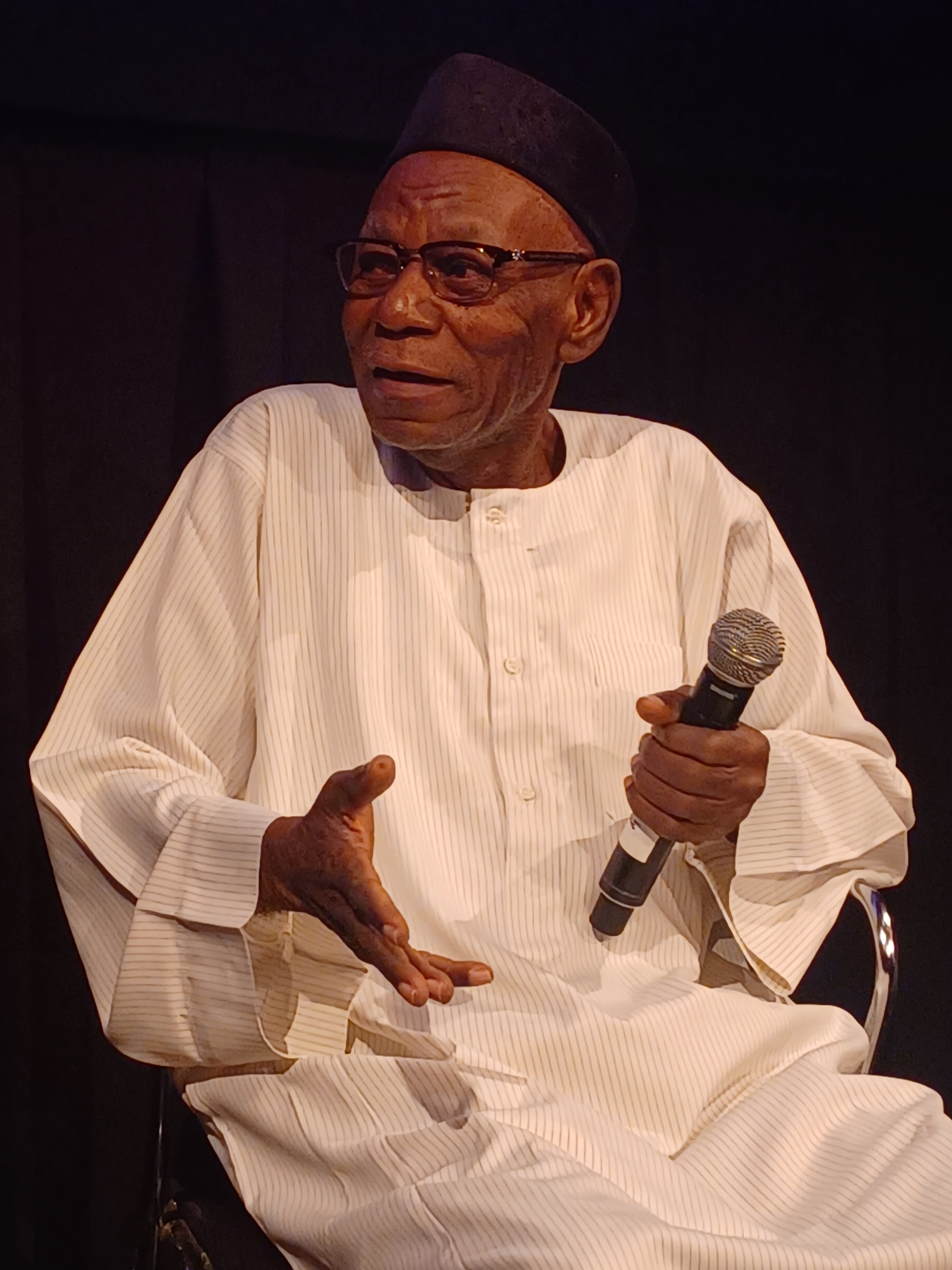
- Born: 1940 (age 85–86)
- Citizenship: Cameroonian
- Occupations: film director and writer.
- Notable work: Histoires drôles et drôles de gens

Jean-Pierre Dikongué Pipa (born 1940) is a Cameroonian film director, playwright and writer. He produced Cameroon's first full-length feature film, Muna Moto, in 1975. Dikongué Pipa's films deal with the interrelationships between elements of traditional Cameroonian culture and the wider world.

== Background ==
Dikongué Pipa completed his high school education in France. Later, between 1962 and 1964, he trained as a filmmaker at the Conservatoire Indépendent du Cinéma Francais.

Using raw film stock, he made 3 documentaries between 1965 and 1966 : Un Simple (Down to Earth), Rendez-vous moi mon père (Give me back my father) and Les Cornes (The Horns) - these were not screened publicly .

== Filmography ==
Film	Year
Badiaga	1987
La Foire aux livres à Hararé	1984
Histoires drôles et drôles de gens	1983
Music and Music: Super Concert	1981
Kpa Kum	1980
Le Prix de la liberté	1978
Muna Moto	1975
Rendez-vous moi mon père	1966
Les Cornes	1966
Un simple	1965
