= I Love You (2007 Mozambican film) =

- Directed by: Rogério Manjate
- Written by: Rogério Manjate
- Produced by: Rogério Manjate
- Starring: Marilia Nuvunga and Seane Jussefa
- Cinematography: Panu Kari
- Edited by: Francisco Martins
- Music by: Rufus Maculuve
- Release date: 2007
- Running time: 3:35 minutes
- Country: Mozambique
- Language: None

I Love You (2007) is a short film made in Mozambique that was directed by Rogério Manjate. It is a Força Maior Production, created with the financial support of UNESCO and Cooperação Belga, Mozambique. The film, which deals with the issue of safe sex, was produced for UNESCO.

== Synopsis ==
The film tells the story of Mandala, a boy of 11 years of age playing football in the street who has discovered that his attractive neighbor, Josephine, is a prostitute. The film briefly features frontal nudity as Josephine "tarts herself up" to go into the city to meet clients. Although very young, Mandala knows about AIDS and struggles with himself because he does not know how to tell Josephine to protect herself by using condoms. He aids her on the way into the city, putting down stones as bridges for her to cross puddles and helping her with shoes. He finds an original and unique way to communicate his message and the innocent love that he feels for her by leaving a condom in one of her shoes with the message "I Love You" written on it which she sees as she departs across the street.

The film has no dialog, because it was meant to be shown in many parts of the world without subtitles.

== Awards ==
The film won the 2008 Durban International Film Festival award for Best Short Film. I Love You also won the short film prizes at the Africa in Motion (AiM) festival which ran from 23 October to 2 November 2008 in Edinburgh, Scotland and at the African Film Festival of Tarifa (FCAT) in Tarifa, Spain in 2009.
