= Karen Boswall =

English documentary filmmaker

- Education: University of Kent
- Occupation: Filmmaker
- Known for: Marrabenta Stories
- Website: www.karenboswall.com

Karen Boswall is an independent film maker, known for documentaries that she made while living and working in Mozambique between 1993 and 2007. She is a part-time lecturer in Visual Anthropology at the University of Kent. Her films cover a range of subjects that include marine conservation, popular music, women & HIV and peace and reconciliation.

== Career and work ==
Before going to Mozambique, Boswall had her own production company in Britain. She has worked around the world as a sound recordist, producer and director. In Mozambique she produced many radio features for the BBC World Service. In 1999 she returned to directing TV documentaries with Living Battles (1998) and From the Ashes (1999), both concerning the recently ended civil war. Dancing on the Edge (2001) is a movie about the risks facing a young woman coming of age in Mozambique where poverty and traditional practices increase the risk of acquiring HIV/AIDS. It is the first made by Catembe Productions, her own production company, which produces educational and children's program.

Boswall's 2004 Marrabenta Stories documents young Mozambican musicians who play jazz, funk and hip-hop joining older men who play the more traditional Marrabenta dance music on a tour of South Africa. Research into a joint project with Jose Eduardo Agualusa to make a film with a strong element of music about the situation of women in the cone of southern Africa, to be called "My Father's Wives", became the basis for a 2008 book by that name by Agualusa. The book may be seen as the script for the projected film.

== Filmography ==
Year	Film	Role	Notes
1997	Cracks in the Mask	Sound	57 minutes. Documentary about the fate of Torres Strait art and artefacts in European museums
1998	Living Battles	Director	52 minutes. Tales from soldiers from the civil war in Mozambique
1999	From the Ashes	Director	26 minutes. In a small village in the south of Mozambique the people heal the wounds of the recent civil war
2001	Dancing on the Edge	Director and Producer	41 minutes. Story about AIDS risk for women in Mozambique
2004	Marrabenta Stories	Director	52 minutes. Documentary about musicians in Mozambique
2010	The Valley of Dawn	Sound	Documentary on an unusual religion in Brazil
2011	Grandma	Sound	Short film about children's misunderstandings of the subject of death
