= Léonce Ngabo =

Burundian film director (born 1951)

- Born: 1951 (age 74–75)
- Citizenship: Burundian
- Occupations: documentary filmmaker; director; producer
- Known for: Gito l'ingrat, Burundi

Léonce Ngabo (born 1951) is a Burundian film director. His 1992 film Gito l'ingrat was the first Burundian feature film.

== Life ==
Ngabo studied chemistry, but kept up his musical interests and wrote the screenplay for a short film and a fairy tale. With the support of a Swiss film-maker, he secured an advance for a full-length feature film. The resulting film, Gito l'ingrat, received international attention.

Ngabo is the founder and chairperson of International Festival of Cinema and Broadcasting in Burundi (FESTICAB). He also helped establish the East African Film Network (EAFN) in 2014, and was elected as EAFN's chair.

== Filmography ==
=== As director ===
- Gito l'ingrat [Gito the Ungrateful], 1992
- Burundi 1850-1962, 2010

=== As actor ===
- Un dimanche à Kigali [A Sunday in Kigali], 2006
