= Michael O. Johnson =

Chief executive officer of Herbalife (2025–present)

- Born: 1954 (age 71–72)
- Education: Western Colorado University
- Occupation: Business executive
- Title: President of International division of Walt Disney Company (2000–2003); CEO of Herbalife Nutrition (2003–2020); Chairman and CEO Herbalife Nutrition (2022–May 2025); Executive Chairman Herbalife Nutrition (May 2025–present)

Michael O. Johnson (born 1954) is an American business executive. He is currently the executive chairman of Herbalife. He previously served as President of The Walt Disney Company, Publisher of Audio Times magazine, and held roles at The Movie Channel, Nickelodeon, and MTV channels of the Warner Amex Satellite Entertainment Company.

== Early life and education ==
Michael O. Johnson was born in 1954. He received his Bachelor of Arts in political science from Western State Colorado University in 1977.

== Early career ==
=== Disney ===
Johnson was hired by the Walt Disney Company in 1986. Six years later, in 1992, he was named head of the company's home video department. In 1997, he was named president of Disney's Buena Vista Home Entertainment. By 2000, Johnson was named president of Walt Disney International, and oversaw the creation and operation of Disney subsidiaries in Asia, Pacific Rim, and Australia. Under his tenure, Disney acquired the rights to the animation library of Japanese anime director-animator Hayao Miyazaki. While individual films by Miyazaki had previously been licensed for the U.S., such as the Fox Video release of My Neighbor Totoro, previous acquisition attempts by Disney were reported as difficult.

== Herbalife ==
Johnson joined Herbalife Nutrition as CEO in 2003, and was named chairman in 2007. During his tenure, the Herbalife brand pivoted away from primarily offering weight-loss products and from the broader perceptions associated with multi-level marketing, a view which he described in an interview with Fortune Magazine as, "When I took over in 2003, Herbalife was a multilevel-marketing company that sold nutrition products. Now it's a nutrition company that uses multilevel marketing as its distribution channel." To achieve this, Johnson implemented quality controls, moved Herbalife's product manufacturing in-house, and widened Herbalife's product offerings.

Johnson expanded the company's new focus on general fitness and nutrition by sponsoring more than 200 sports teams and athletes, such as Cristiano Ronaldo, as well as company sponsorship of the LA Galaxy professional soccer team. Johnson also sought to minimize company claims to distributors around exceptional "business opportunity" to set a more realistic tone during pitches.

Johnson became a notable figure between 2012 and 2015 following a short sale of Herbalife stock by Bill Ackman and his hedge fund Pershing Square Capital Management. Ackman alleged that Herbalife is a pyramid scheme and built a billion-dollar short position in Herbalife stock. Ackman's short position was widely covered by American media outlets and was the subject of the documentary Betting on Zero.

In June 2017, Johnson stepped down as CEO of Herbalife and was named executive chairman of the company. Two years later, he was named interim CEO following the resignation of Richard Goudis.

In October 2022, Johnson was again named chairman and interim chief executive officer following the departure of Dr. John Agwunobi.

In May 2025, after Stephan Gratziani appointed as Herbalife's new CEO, Johnson transitioned to the position of executive chairman.
