= Lawrence D. Ackman =

American real estate entrepreneur (1939–2022)

- Born: April 29, 1939; New York City, U.S.
- Died: May 31, 2022 (aged 83); Boston, Massachusetts, U.S.
- Education: Brown University (BA); Harvard University (MBA)
- Spouse: Ronnie Posner
- Children: Bill Ackman, Jeanne Ackman

Lawrence David Ackman (April 29, 1939 – May 31, 2022) was an American real estate entrepreneur who led the Ackman-Ziff Real Estate Group, a company founded by his father and uncle. Ackman is noted for playing a role in the development of the mortgage brokerage industry. His son Bill Ackman is a billionaire hedge-fund mogul.

== Early life and education ==
Lawrence David Ackman was born on April 29, 1939, in New York City to Herman and Jean (Miller) Ackman. His paternal grandfather, Abraham Ackman immigrated to the United States from Russia in 1887. Ackman was raised in Manhattan and the Bronx; he attended the Riverdale Country School, graduating in 1956. Ackman attended Brown University for his undergraduate studies, majoring in economics. He completed his MBA in finance at Harvard Business School in 1963.

== Career ==
During his career, Ackman arranged financing for Seymour Durst, Friedland Properties, and Harry Helmsley, among other clients. In the 1990s, Ackman worked to finance the redevelopment of a property on Manhattan's Ninth Avenue, which now houses Chelsea Market.

Ackman became president of the Ackman-Ziff Real Estate Group in 1968 and the company's CEO in 1977.

== Personal life ==
Ackman sat on the board of the New York Philharmonic and served as Chairman of the Pershing Square Foundation.

Ackman died on May 31, 2022, at Massachusetts General Hospital. He was survived by his wife, Ronnie Posner; his son, Bill Ackman; and his daughter, Jeanne Ackman.
