= Ted Braun =

American film director, professor and screenwriter

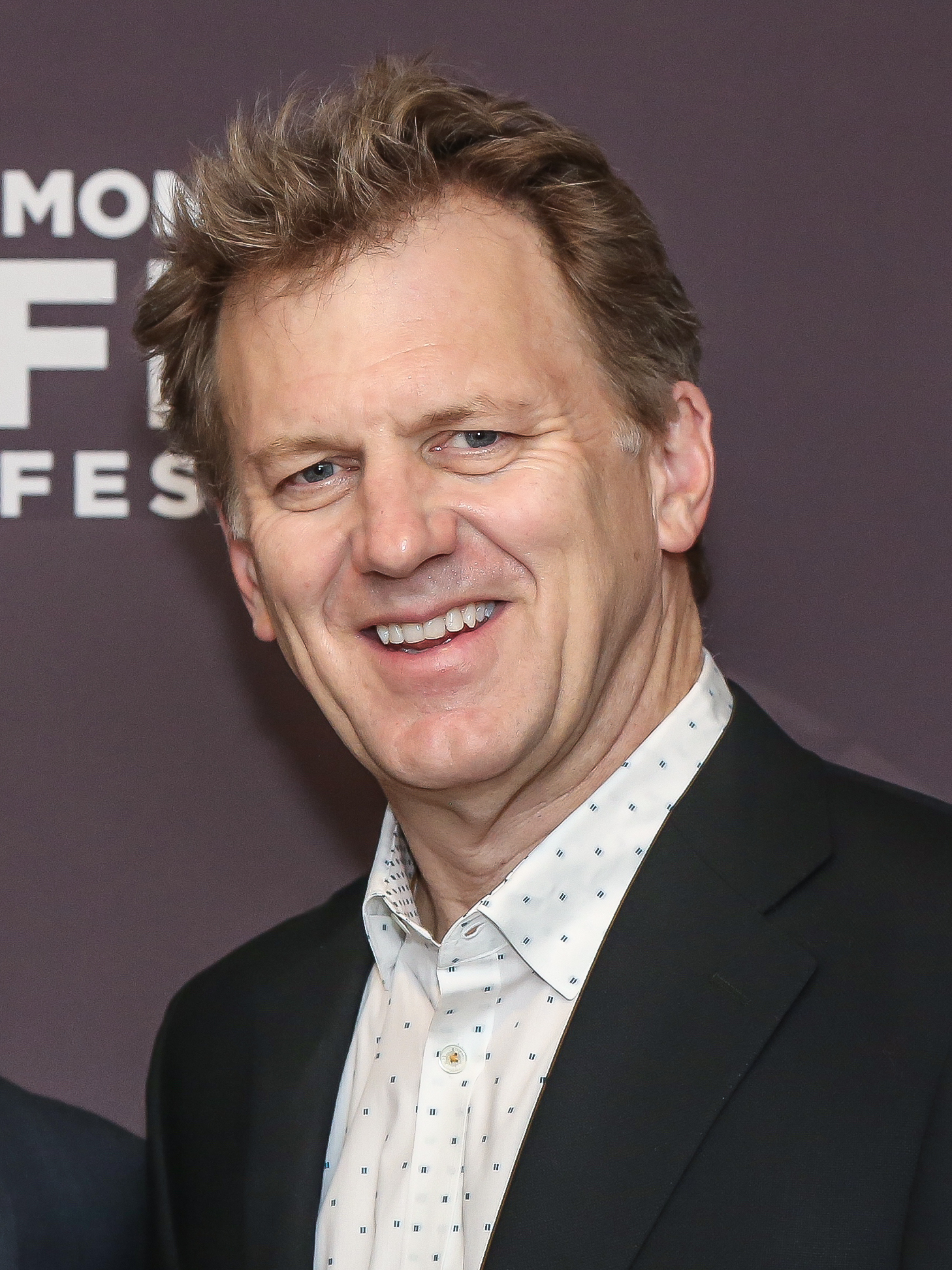
- Braun in 2016
- Occupations: Film director, screenwriter, professor
- Years active: 1994–present

Theodore Braun is an American filmmaker best known for his feature documentaries Darfur Now (2007), Betting on Zero (2017), and ¡Viva Maestro! (2022). He works in non-fiction across documentary and scripted forms with a focus on global conflict. He has won the International Documentary Association's Emerging Filmmaker Award, an NAACP Image Award for Best Feature Documentary and been nominated twice for the WGA Award for Best Feature Documentary Screenplay.

He is also a professor in the University of Southern California's School of Cinematic Arts' Writing Division. where he is the inaugural holder of the Joseph Campbell Endowed Chair in Cinematic Ethics.

In September 2025, it was announced that he will be the director of the new low residency MFA in Screenwriting program at Bennington College.

== Early life ==
Braun was born in Kansas City, Kansas, and grew up in Charlotte, Vermont. He went to Champlain Valley Union High School in rural Vermont and while there was the principal bassoonist with the Vermont Youth Orchestra. He received his B.A. in English at Amherst College, and his Master of Fine Arts in film and television production at USC's School of Cinematic Arts, where he studied with Frantisek Daniel, Nina Foch, and Mark Jonathan Harris.

== Career ==
His critically acclaimed first feature film, Darfur Now, was produced by the Academy Award winning producer of Crash, Cathy Schulman, Academy Award nominee Don Cheadle, and three-time Academy Award winning documentarian Mark Jonathan Harris. Warner Bros. distributed Darfur Now worldwide and financed it along with Participant, which spearheaded a global social action campaign. The film earned him the International Documentary Association award for Emerging Filmmaker of the Year (2007) and was nominated for best documentary of 2007 by the National Board of Review and the Broadcast Film Critics Association. It went on to win the NAACP Image Award for Outstanding Documentary. In their winter 2008 issue, MovieMaker named Braun - along with Errol Morris, Oliver Stone, Michael Moore, and Robert Redford - one of 25 filmmakers whose work has changed the world.

His feature documentary, Betting on Zero, chronicles the campaign of controversial hedge fund titan Bill Ackman and Latina activist Julie Contreras to expose Herbalife as a massive international pyramid scheme and was the subject of extensive international press coverage - in The New York Times, The Washington Post, The Wall Street Journal, The Guardian, El País, and was featured on Last Week Tonight with John Oliver. Kirsten Dunst cited the film as an inspiration for her work in On Becoming a God in Central Florida, the acclaimed Showtime series she starred in, created by two of Braun's former students, Robert Funke and Matt Lutsky. Betting on Zero premiered in the World Doc Competition at the Tribeca Film Festival in 2016, where it won a special jury mention for investigative work and was nominated for a Writers Guild of America award for best documentary screenplay of 2017.

¡Viva Maestro! was his second feature documentary with Participant. The film was produced by Steve Tisch, Academy Award winning producer of Forrest Gump, Dean Schramm, Nicolas Paine and Howard Bragman. The film brings to life conductor Gustavo Dudamel's music making against social unrest and violence that unfolded in his Venezuelan homeland during the spring and summer of 2017. ¡Viva Maestro! was distributed by Greenwich Entertainment and debuted theatrically in April 2022 to widespread critical acclaim. It premiered on Max in December 2022 and was nominated for a Writers Guild of America award for best documentary screenplay of 2022.

Prior to Darfur Now Braun wrote and directed award winning short form fictional films and documentaries for HBO, PBS, A&E and the Discovery Channel on topics ranging from test pilots of aviation's golden age to the battle for the rights of the developmentally disabled.

== Academic life ==
Braun taught screenwriting at Amherst College in 1994 as a visiting writer before joining the screenwriting faculty at the USC School of Cinematic Arts, where he is a professor in the John Wells Division of Writing for Screen & Television, and the inaugural holder of the Joseph Campbell Endowed Chair in Cinematic Ethics. He created a course on cinematic ethics in 2017 that develops student's capacity for ethical decision making through case studies of dilemmas faced by professionals in the field. The course is now required of all MFA students in the various divisions of USC's School of Cinematic Arts. Since 2020, he has been teaching with the founding prosecutor of the International Criminal Court, Luis Moreno Ocampo. Their courses explore how cinematic arts engage questions of war, justice, and global narratives. In their April 2018 report on the best film schools, Variety magazine named him one of the world's ten top teachers in film and TV.

== Selected filmography as director ==
- Darfur Now (2007)
- Betting on Zero (2016)
- ¡Viva Maestro! (2022)
