= Pershing Square Holdings =

Guernsey investment company

Pershing Square Holdings Ltd.
- Company type: Public
- Traded as: LSE: PSH; FTSE 100 component
- Founded: 2 February 2012
- Headquarters: Saint Peter Port, Guernsey
- AUM: $16.1bn (2026)
- Website: www.pershingsquareholdings.com

Pershing Square Holdings is a Guernsey investment trust and financial services company. The company is a constituent of the FTSE 100 Index on the London Stock Exchange. The fund is managed by Bill Ackman of Pershing Square Capital Management. Pershing Square Holdings tracks the performance of Pershing Square Capital Management, an American fund.

== History ==
The company was incorporated in 2012 and was then the subject of an initial public offering on Euronext Amsterdam in 2014. In December 2025, Pershing Square Holdings agreed to acquire up to £750 million of non-voting exchangeable perpetual preferred stock in Howard Hughes Holdings.
