= Adam Sterling =

American humanitarian (born 1983)

Adam Sterling (born 1983) was the executive director of the Sudan Divestment Task Force, a project of the Genocide Intervention Network, and a graduate of University of California, Los Angeles with degrees in Political Science and African American Studies.

Born in Los Angeles, he appeared in the film Darfur Now as himself, trying to reduce the effects of genocide on the Sudanese through a bill he proposes to California Governor Arnold Schwarzenegger.

He has received many humanitarian awards, and been nominated for awards such as the "Do Something" Teen choice award and his works regarding Sudan have been published in The Wall Street Journal, the Los Angeles Times, The New York Times, and more.
