= Darfur Now =

- Promotional poster
- Directed by: Ted Braun
- Written by: Ted Braun
- Produced by: Cathy Schulman; Don Cheadle; Mark Jonathan Harris
- Starring: Don Cheadle; Luis Moreno-Ocampo; Adam Sterling; Sheikh Ahmad Mohammed Abakar; Hejewa Adam; Pablo Recalde
- Cinematography: Kirsten Johnson
- Edited by: Edgar Burcksen; Leonard Feinstein
- Music by: Graeme Revell
- Distributed by: Warner Independent Pictures; Participant Productions
- Release date: November 2, 2007
- Running time: 98 minutes
- Country: United States
- Language: English

Darfur Now is a 2007 American documentary film examining the genocide in Darfur. It was written and directed by Ted Braun and produced by Don Cheadle, Mark Jonathan Harris, and Cathy Schulman. Executive producers included Jeffrey Skoll, Omar Amanat, Dean Schramm, Diane Weyermann, and Matt Palmieri. The film is a call to action for people all over the world to help the ongoing crisis in Darfur.

Darfur Now premiered at the 2007 Toronto International Film Festival. The film was released in the United States and Canada on November 2, 2007.

== Summary ==
Darfur Now follows the story of six individuals, who are tied together by the same cause: the crisis in Darfur. These individuals include Don Cheadle, an Oscar-nominated actor using his celebrity status to draw attention to the issue, as well as Adam Sterling, a 24-year-old waiter and activist urging Governor Arnold Schwarzenegger to sign a bill to keep California funds from investing in companies with interests in Sudan, and Luis Moreno-Ocampo, the Prosecutor of the International Criminal Court in The Hague, Netherlands. Then there's the ones actually situated in Darfur: Hejewa Adam, a woman whose baby was beaten to death by Janjaweed attackers who now fights in the Sudanese Liberation Army; Ahmed Mohammed Abakar, a displaced builder and farmer who now serves as leader and head sheikh of a camp of 47,000 other displaced Darfurians; and Pablo Recalde, leader of the World Food Programme in West Darfur.

== Reception ==
On the review aggregator website Rotten Tomatoes, 73% of 59 critics' reviews are positive, with an average rating of 6.6/10. The website's consensus reads: "Although Darfur Now is not always engaging as cinema, the film succeeds in bringing attention to the crisis in Darfur." Metacritic, which uses a weighted average, assigned the film a score of 66 out of 100, based on 21 critics, indicating "generally favorable" reviews.

== See also ==
- Eyes and Ears of God: Video Surveillance of Sudan, a 2012 documentary film
- Nuba Conversations, a 2000 documentary film
- Sri Lanka's Killing Fields, a 2011 documentary film
- War in Darfur
