= Pershing Square Capital Management =

American hedge fund

Pershing Square Capital Management, L.P.
- Type: Private
- Industry: Investment management; Hedge fund
- Founded: January 1, 2004; 22 years ago
- Founder: Bill Ackman
- Headquarters: New York City, U.S.
- Key people: Bill Ackman (CEO); Ben Hakim (President); Michael Gonnella (CFO)
- Products: Investment funds
- AUM: ▲US$19.7 billion (as of May 31, 2025)
- Number of employees: 84 (2025)
- Website: pershingsquareholdings.com

Pershing Square Capital Management (Pershing Square) is an American hedge fund based in New York City. It specializes in activist investments, using influence over company management through the purchase of shares and by exerting pressure on management. Pershing Square was founded on January 1, 2004, by Bill Ackman, a hedge fund manager who was a co-founder of the investment firm Gotham Partners in 1992.

Pershing Square was initially capitalized with Ackman's personal funds and $54 million raised from Leucadia National, a prominent investor with whom he had previously collaborated on Gotham Partners projects. This provided the firm with a substantial liquidity reserve at its inception.

In October 2014, Pershing Square Holdings, a closed-end investment fund managed by Ackman, made its initial public offering (IPO) on the Amsterdam Stock Exchange. The listing raised $2.73 billion, exceeding the initially planned $2 billion. Shares were priced at $25 per share during the IPO but closed at $22 on the first trading day, reflecting a 9.9% discount to the fund’s net asset value.

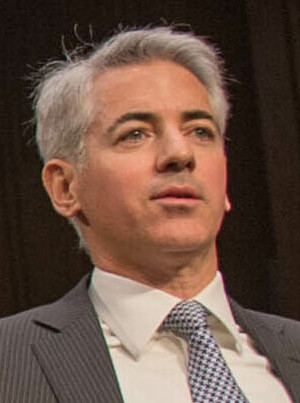
Bill Ackman in 2016

== Investment history ==
Pershing Square has launched activist campaigns against McDonald's, Wendy's, and Herbalife.

In 2005, Pershing Square bought a significant share in fast food chain Wendy's International and successfully pressured them to sell off its Tim Horton's donut chain. Wendy's spun off the Canadian restaurant restaurant chain through an IPO in 2006 and raised $670 million for Wendy's investors. After Ackman sold his shares at a substantial profit after a dispute over executive succession, the stock price collapsed, raising criticism that the sale of Wendy's fastest growing unit left the company in a weaker market position. Ackman blamed the poor performance on their new CEO.

In December 2007, his funds owned a 10% stake in Target Corporation, valued at $4.2 billion through the purchase of stock and derivatives. By 2009, their Target holdings had been reduced to 7.8%. In December 2010, his funds held a 38% stake in Borders and on December 6, 2010, Ackman indicated he would finance a buyout of Barnes & Noble for $900 million.

On January 9, 2009, the fund disclosed a 7.4% ownership stake in General Growth Properties (GGP) according to documents filed with the SEC, becoming the second-largest shareholder behind Brookfield Asset Management. The fund was betting on the company going bankrupt in such a way as to leave its shareholders intact. In November 2010, Pershing Square helped the company emerge from Chapter 11 bankruptcy protection. In August 2012 the fund held beneficial ownership of 7.7 percent of GGP's stock. General Growth Partners repurchased Pershing Square's remaining stake in February 2014.

In 2010, Pershing Square reported having taken large ownership stakes in JCPenney and Canadian Pacific Railway.

In July 2012, Ackman acknowledged to CNBC he had acquired shares in Procter & Gamble worth approximately $1.8 billion, a 1% stake in the company, with the idea of taking an activist role within the corporation. Pershing Square later reduced its stake in Procter & Gamble, which was valued at around $60 million by the end of 2013.

In December 2012, Pershing Square launched a new closed-end fund called Pershing Square Holdings (PSH), which raised $3 billion in an October 2014 IPO on Amsterdam's Euronext stock market. As a closed-end fund valued at $6.7 billion, PSH was designed as a permanent capital vehicle from which investors would not be able to directly withdraw funds. PSH reported 17.1% in returns since inception (December 2012–November 2017) under Ackman's management, 80% below the S&P 500.

In a statement dated August 27, 2013, Pershing Square reported that it had hired Citigroup to liquidate the 39.1 million shares the firm then owned of JCPenney at a price of $12.90 per share, resulting in a loss of approximately $500 million.

In 2013, Pershing Square acquired a $2.2 billion stake in Air Products & Chemicals, and nominated Matt Paull to serve on the company's board. Pershing Square sold its stake in 2017. According to a letter cited by Reuters, during Pershing Square’s four-and-half-year investment, APD delivered a 104.7% total shareholder return.

In the first quarter of 2016, the hedge fund experienced its "biggest-ever quarterly loss" of 25%, due in part to its 9% stake in Valeant Pharmaceuticals International. Ackman, who joined Valeant's board in March 2016, commented on the company's 88% loss since August 2015 stating, “This is going to be a badly scraped knee that may even require stitches but it is not life threatening... We should be able to recover the lion's share of our investment—if not all of it—over time". After the controversial drug prices and operations of Valeant became public, Ackman and Valeant's board fired former CEO Mike Pearson, and Pershing Square sold all of its stake in Valeant with a total loss of $4 billion.

In September 2016, Pershing Square continued its investment in fast food by buying a 9.9% stake in Chipotle Mexican Grill. As of March 2018, Pershing Square held a 10.3% stake in Chipotle. In 2018, Ackman dumped $500 million into the publicly traded arm of Pershing Square Capital Management stating it was significantly undervalued at roughly $15 a share. As of September 2019, the fund returned 54.5% with a share price of $19.10, the highest since January 2016.

In March 2020, Pershing Square made $2.6 billion (£2.2 billion) betting that there would be a market crash.

In November 2020, Pershing Square took a position against corporate credit.

In April 2022, Pershing Square lost in excess of $430 million on Netflix after a three month–long bet.

In August 2023, Ackman said that Pershing Square took a short position on 30-year Treasury bills through options instead of shorting the bonds outright, betting that long-term inflation will settle about 100 points higher than Federal Reserve's 2% target. He closed the position less than three months later citing geopolitical risks surrounding the Gaza war and slowing economy, netting $200 million in the process.

=== Pershing Square Tontine Holdings ===
Pershing Square Tontine Holdings (PSTH) was a blank check company formed by Bill Ackman that went public on July 22, 2020, at a value of $4 billion and traded under the ticker symbol PSTH.U before the split of its warrants and shares. In 2020, PSTH was the largest SPAC to IPO to date.

PSTH had a unique "Tontine" structure where shareholders were incentivized to hold shares through merger once a target was found for acquisition. The IPO included 200 million units, which included a total of 200 million shares and 22,222,222 warrants. Another 44,444,444 warrants, or two ninths per share, were distributed to shareholders who chose to participate in the proposed merger. The strike price of PSTH warrants were $23.

In July 2022, Ackman addressed PSTH shareholders saying that he would return the funds of the SPAC as he was "unable to consummate a transaction that both meets our investment criteria and is executable."

=== Universal Music Group ===
Pershing Square acquired a 7.1% stake of Universal Music Group (UMG) from Vivendi in August 2021 for $2.8 billion. Later that month, Pershing Square agreed to purchase an additional 2.9% of UMG from Vivendi for $1.149 billion. Following the transaction, Pershing Square held 10% of UMG's share capital. Ackman was nominated to a non-independent director of UMG in March 2022.

On 7 April 2026 it was announced Pershing has proposed a merger with Universal, in a takeover offer reportedly to be worth $64.3bn that would result in the combined company being listed in the United States by the end of 2026, according to its billionaire chief executive, Bill Ackman.

=== Netflix position ===
In January 2022, Ackman disclosed that Pershing Square acquired a $1.1 billion stake in Netflix. Netflix stock had just experienced a precipitous 30% selloff after announcement of a disappointing subscriber growth outlook for Q1 2022. In a letter to its investors, Ackman praised Netflix's "best-in-class management team" and said he long admired Netflix CEO Reed Hastings and the "remarkable company he and his team have built."

In April, Netflix stock fell by 35%, and Ackman responded by selling his entire stake in the company. The fund lost over $430 million over the three-month investment.

=== Herbalife ===
In December 2012, Ackman announced the firm had made a $1 billion short bet against Herbalife, a maker of weight-loss and vitamin supplements, calling the company a "pyramid scheme". After activist billionaire investor Carl Icahn bought a stake in the company in January 2013, the share price rose nearly 13% and the investment was seen by analysts as the worst investment ever made by the firm. After a persistent political and grassroots campaign funded by Ackman and the firm, the Federal Trade Commission initiated a civil investigation into Herbalife, causing its stock to drop enough that by March 2014, Pershing Square was nearly even on their bet. In April 2014, Reuters reported that, according to its sources, the FBI conducted a probe into Herbalife and reviewed documents obtained from the company's former distributors.

On March 12, 2015, it reported that Ackman was under investigation by federal prosecutors and the FBI; Ackman was quoted that he would not back down from his claims against Herbalife. In July 2015, U.S. District Judge Dale Fischer dismissed a suit filed by Herbalife investors who claimed the company defrauded shareholders by concealing the company's ability to track retail sales. In July 2016, Herbalife settled with the Federal Trade Commission, agreeing to pay $200 million and restructure its business practices in exchange for not being labelled a pyramid scheme.

=== Platform Specialty Products Corporation ===
In June 2014, Pershing Square was the largest institutional holder of the shares of Platform Specialty Products Corporation, owning a 24.28% stake. Pershing Square first disclosed the position in January 2014, shortly after Platform debuted on the New York Stock Exchange. Subsequently, in April 2014, Platform announced a deal to acquire the agrochemicals business of Chemtura for approximately $1 billion. Agriphar, another agricultural specialty chemicals company, agreed in August 2014 to become the third company to join the Platform umbrella.

In April 2014, Ackman singled out Platform Specialty Products in "The Outsider" presentation, which discusses optimal methods of capital allocation.

Pershing Square sold its stake in Element Solutions (formerly Platform Specialty Products) in 2019.

== In popular culture ==
Pershing Square's investment ventures are featured in two financial documentaries.

- Betting on Zero features Bill Ackman's economic activism in the $1 billion shorting of Herbalife Nutrition by Pershing in a positive light, highlighting the costly lengths to which the fund went in trying to prove the allegation that the multi-level marketing company was in fact a pyramid scheme.
- The "Drug Short" episode of Dirty Money shines a more doubtful light on Ackman's decision to double down on the fund's Valeant investments until the forced departure of former CEO Mike Pearson.
