= Herbalife =

American global multi-level marketing company

Coordinates: 33.8572°N 118.2919°W

Herbalife Nutrition Ltd.
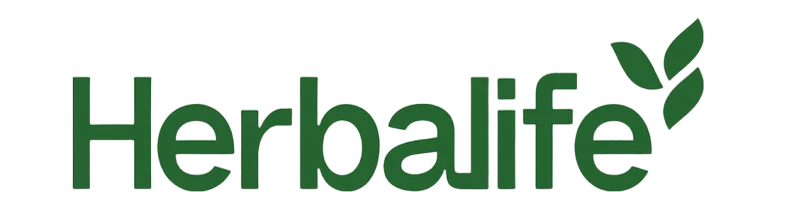
- Type: Public company
- Traded as: NYSE: HLF; Russell 2000 component
- ISIN: KYG4412G1010
- Industry: Multi-level marketing
- Founded: February 1980; 46 years ago in Los Angeles, California, U.S.
- Founder: Mark R. Hughes
- Headquarters: L.A. Live; Los Angeles, California, U.S.; legal domicile: Cayman Islands
- Key people: Stephan Gratziani (CEO) Michael O. Johnson (Executive chairman)
- Products: Dietary supplements; protein supplements; personal care; sports nutrition
- Revenue: US$5.04 billion (2025)
- Operating income: US$481 million (2025)
- Net income: US$228 million (2025)
- Number of employees: 8,900+ (2023)
- Website: herbalife.com

Herbalife Nutrition Ltd., also called Herbalife International, Inc. (with a U.S. subsidiary called Herbalife International of America) or simply Herbalife, is an American multinational multi-level marketing (MLM) corporation that develops and sells dietary supplements.

The company was founded by Mark R. Hughes in 1980, and employs an estimated 9,900 people worldwide. The company operates in 95 countries through a network of approximately 4.5 million independent distributors and members. In October 2022, previous CEO Michael O. Johnson was appointed as chairman and interim chief executive officer following the departure of John Agwunobi. The business is incorporated in the Cayman Islands, a tax haven, with its corporate headquarters located in Los Angeles, California.

Herbalife has been accused of fraudulently operating a pyramid scheme, deceiving distributors about the amount of income they could expect to earn and that most of their income would be made from recruiting additional distributors instead of from selling merchandise. The company agreed to "fundamentally restructure" its compensation and other benefits in the United States to include tying distributor rewards to verifiable sales, and pay a $200 million fine as part of a 2016 settlement with the U.S. Federal Trade Commission (FTC) following these accusations.

According to a 2007 research paper, some products sold by Herbalife have caused acute hepatitis.

== History ==
In February 1980, Mark R. Hughes began selling the original Herbalife weight management product from the trunk of his car. Hughes often stated that the genesis of his product and program stemmed from the weight loss concerns of his mother Joanne whose premature death he attributed to an eating disorder and an unhealthy approach to weight loss. His first product was a protein shake designed to help people manage their weight. He structured his company using a direct-selling, multi-level marketing model.

In 1982, Herbalife received complaints from the Food and Drug Administration for claims made about certain products and the inclusion of mandrake, poke root, and food-grade linseed oil in another.

The Department of Justice of Canada filed criminal charges against the company in November 1984 for misleading medical claims in advertisements. As a result of the complaints, the company modified its product claims and reformulated the product.

By 1985, Herbalife was considered the fastest-growing private company in America by Inc. after its sales increased from $386 thousand to $423 million over the previous five years. That same year, the California Attorney General sued the company for making inflated claims about the efficacy of its products. The company suffered as a result of the lawsuit and was forced to lay off nearly 800 employees by May 1985. The company settled the suit for $850,000 without admitting wrongdoing.

In 1986, Herbalife became a publicly traded company on the NASDAQ and rebranded itself as Herbalife International. However, as a result of the negative publicity from the FDA lawsuit, the company posted a $3 million loss that year.

By 1988, the company had expanded its reach to Japan, Spain, New Zealand, Israel, and Mexico, and it increased its worldwide sales to $191 million in 1991.

In 1993, the company underwent a secondary offering of five million shares.

The company launched a line of personal care products in 1995 which included fragrances and facial cleansing products.

The company was sued in civil court by two former distributors in 1997 for withholding earned income.

In 1999, Hughes attempted to take the company private after asserting that Wall Street was undervaluing it. While the board approved the buyout offer, shareholders of the company filed a suit against the company because they believed the share price they were offered was unfair. Hughes eventually abandoned his attempt to buy the company and settled the suit with shareholders. On May 20, 2000, Mark Hughes died at age 44. Following his death, the company was led by Christopher Pair until October 2001.

In March 2026, Herbalife acquired Bioniq, a UK-based personalized supplements company that uses blood biomarker analysis to formulate products, for up to US$150 million.

=== J.H. Whitney & Company and Golden Gate Capital ===
In 2002, the company was acquired for US$685 million by J.H. Whitney & Company and Golden Gate Capital. Concurrently, plant sources of ephedrine were removed from Herbalife products in 2002 after several U.S. states banned supplements containing such herbs.

In April 2003, Michael O. Johnson joined Herbalife as CEO following a 17-year career with The Walt Disney Company.

On December 16, 2004, the company had an initial public offering on the NYSE of 14.5 million common shares at $14 per share, netting the owners $1.3 billion.

On May 7, 2014, the company announced that it entered into a deal with Bank of America Merrill Lynch to repurchase $266 million of its stock.

The company announced in November 2016 that Chief Operating Officer Richard Goudis would take over the position of CEO in June 2017 and Johnson would transition to Executive Chairman.

In August 2017, the company announced that it would repurchase up to $600 million of its stock.

On April 25, 2018, Herbalife announced that it had changed its name from Herbalife Ltd. to Herbalife Nutrition Ltd. The company also announced that its shareholders had approved a two-for-one stock split.

In January 2019, Herbalife announced that it was replacing Goudis after learning of comments he had made before taking over as CEO that were "contrary to the company’s expense-related policies and business practices” and inconsistent with the company's standards and culture". Former CEO Johnson subsequently took over the role on an interim basis.

In March 2020, John Agwunobi was appointed Chief Executive Officer. Agwunobi departed from Herbalife in October 2022 and Michael O. Johnson was appointed Chairman and interim Chief Executive Officer.

In May 2025, Stephan Gratziani was appointed Chief Executive Officer, becoming the first distributor since founder Mark Hughes to lead the company. Michael O. Johnson transitioned in the position of Executive Chairman.

== Products ==
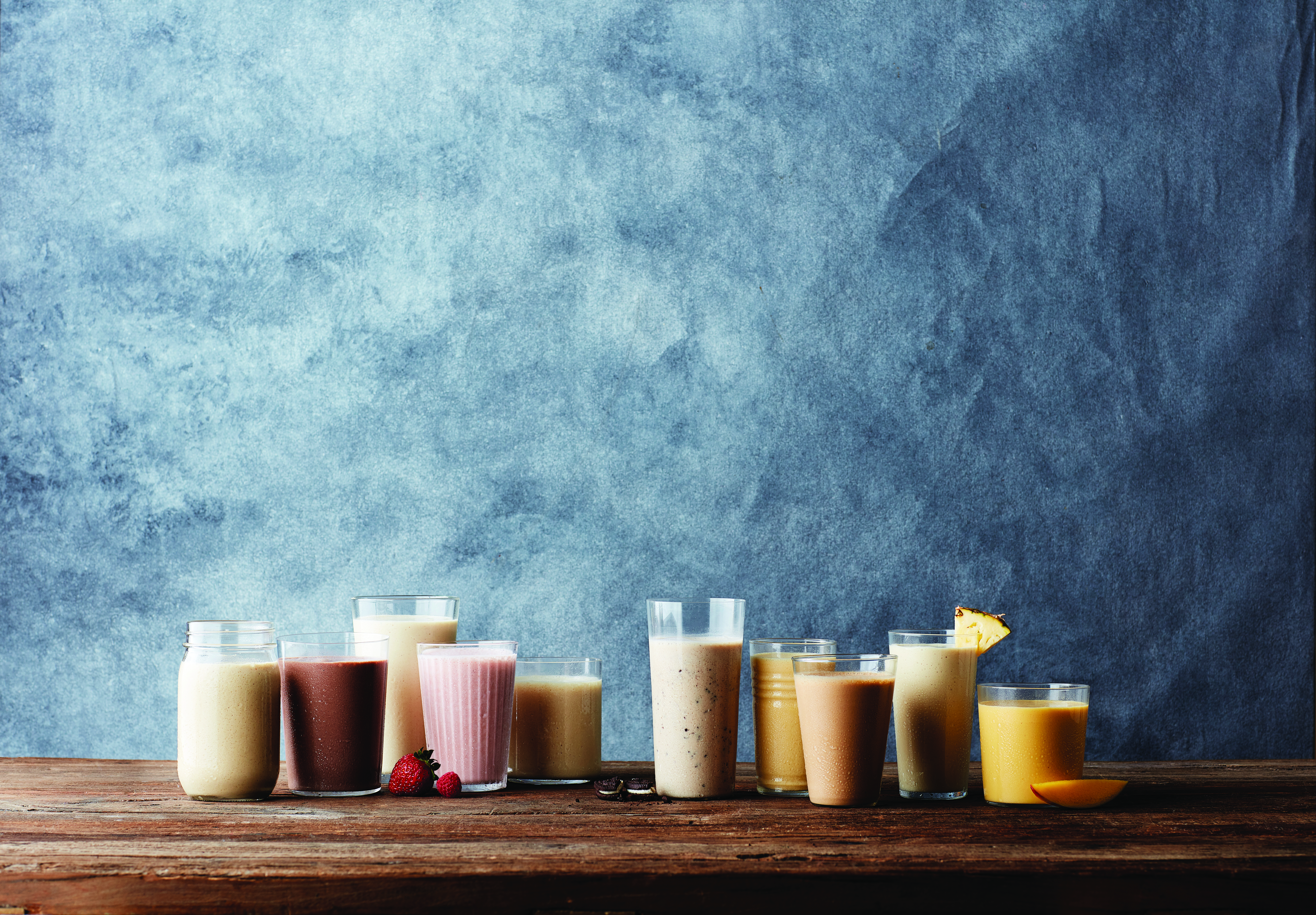
Herbalife Nutrition products

Herbalife Nutrition's products include weight-loss and protein shakes, as well as protein bars, teas, aloes, vitamins, and sports hydration, energy, and personal care products. The company's original product is the Formula 1 protein shake, a soy-based meal-replacement shake. The product debuted in 1980 and, as of 2015, was the company's best selling product accounting for nearly 30% of total sales.

Herbalife's products are produced at the company's five manufacturing facilities in the U.S. and China, as well as by third-party manufacturing partners. The company's production process is based on a "seed to feed" strategy, which the company initiated in the 2010s that allows it to trace where the ingredients in its nutritional products originated. Since 2013, the company has operated a botanical extraction facility in Changsha, Hunan Province, China. The facility produces botanical extracts, including teas, guarana, chamomile, broccoli, and bilberry, for use in many of the company's products. Before extracts are processed, they undergo a botanical identification program and are tested several times throughout the production process. The processed raw materials from the extraction facility are used at all of the company's branded manufacturing facilities as well as by its partners. As of 2015, 58% of the company's nutrition products were manufactured at Herbalife-owned facilities.

In China, the company's manufacturing sites are located in Suzhou and Nanjing. In the U.S., the company has manufacturing facilities in Lake Forest, California, and Winston-Salem, North Carolina.

Herbalife's claims of health benefits from its products have met scrutiny from the medical community, consumers, and government agencies.

In 2008, Herbalife was sued after laboratory tests indicated that levels of lead in several Herbalife products were in excess of California state law and could lead to liver problems over an extended period of time. The company commissioned its own lab testing and found that those products did not contain high enough amounts of lead to require special labeling.

== Business model ==
Herbalife Nutrition is a multi-level marketing company. A 2010 article in the Los Angeles Business Journal claimed that Herbalife Nutrition was one of the most profitable companies in Los Angeles County and directly benefited from its business model.

As a result of the 2016 FTC settlement, the company is required to prove that at least 80 percent of its sales are made to individuals outside of its distributor network. Distributors are responsible for providing receipts for sales and proving they have legitimate customers. The settlement also required that distributors are only able to earn one-third of their rewards based on recruitment. In the U.S., the company now differentiates between individuals who join as a member to buy discounted products and those who join as a distributor seeking a business opportunity. Discount buyers are unable to earn rewards or sell products. Herbalife Nutrition is also required to have its practices monitored by an outside party for seven years to ensure compliance.

In the past, company management considered the number and retention of distributors a key parameter and tracked it closely in financial reports. By January of each year, sales leaders are required to requalify. In February of each year, individuals who did not satisfy the sales leader qualification requirements during the preceding 12 months are removed from that rank. For the latest 12-month requalification period ending January 2019, approximately 67.9 percent of the eligible sales leaders requalified.

In a California class action suit (Minton v. Herbalife International, et al.) filed on February 17, 2005, the plaintiff challenged "the marketing practices of certain Herbalife International independent distributors under various state laws". In a West Virginia class action suit (Mey v. Herbalife International, Inc., et al.) filed on July 16, 2003, the plaintiffs alleged that some of Herbalife International's distributors used pre-recorded telephone messages and autodialers to contact prospective customers in violation of the Telephone Consumer Protection Act. The case was resolved with Herbalife and its distributors paying $7 million into a fund for class members part of the suit.

== Liver disease inquiries ==
Hospitals in Israel, Spain, Switzerland, Iceland, Argentina, and the United States have reported liver damage in a number of patients who used Herbalife products.

In 2004, Israel's Health Minister began an investigation into Herbalife's products after four persons using Herbalife's products were found to have liver problems. The company was criticized for the presence of lead and other heavy metals in some of its products, with comfrey specifically flagged for its association with liver toxicity. The products were sent to Bio-Medical Research Design LTD (B.R.D), to a private U.S. laboratory, and to Israel's Forensic research laboratory. A study of the cases funded by the Israeli Ministry of Health concluded that there was a causative relationship. Herbalife's SEC 10-Q filings stated that the Israeli Ministry of Health did not establish a causal relationship between the product and liver ailments. In 2009, an Israeli woman sued Herbalife International and Herbalife Israel, claiming that her liver damage resulted from the use of Herbalife products.

Scientific studies in 2007 by doctors at the University Hospital of Bern in Switzerland and the Liver Unit of the Hadassah-Hebrew University Medical Center in Israel found an association between consumption of Herbalife products and hepatitis. In response, the Spanish Ministry of Health issued an alert asking for caution in consuming Herbalife products. Herbalife stated they were cooperating fully with Spanish authorities, and after investigation, the agency determined no action was required and removed the alert.

In January 2009, the Scientific Committee of the Spanish Agency for Food Safety and Nutrition (AESAN) reached the same conclusion. After reviewing cases implicating Herbalife products in Spain, Switzerland, Israel, Finland, France, Italy, Iceland and Portugal, the 12-member scientific panel issued a report concluding: "The analyses of these cases and information regarding their circumstances have not allowed us to establish a causal relationship" between liver anomalies and Herbalife's dietary supplements. The panel attributed the cases to metabolic changes from overzealous and unsupervised dieting.

A July 2013 peer-reviewed study published in the World Journal of Hepatology reexamined known cases of hepatotoxicity that had previously been linked to consumption of Herbalife products and concluded that using "the liver specific Council for International Organizations of Medical Sciences scale, causality was probable in 1 case, unlikely and excluded in the other cases. Thus, causality levels were much lower than hitherto proposed". In a separate review published less than a year earlier, the same author described the relationship between Herbalife products and reported hepatotoxicity cases as "highly probable".

In 2019, the Journal of Clinical and Experimental Hepatology published a paper titled "Slimming to the Death: Herbalife-Associated Fatal Acute Liver Failure-Heavy Metals, Toxic Compounds, Bacterial Contaminants and Psychotropic Agents in Products Sold in India". This paper examined the connection between Herbalife slimming products and a case of fatal acute liver failure in one patient in India. In December 2020, the journal retracted the aforementioned article, contrary to the COPE guidelines, which advise that the original paper should remain available but prominently marked as retracted. According to one of the co-authors of the paper, this retraction happened because Herbalife engaged DSK Legal, a New Delhi–based law firm, to consistently issue legal threats to the journal's editor-in-chief.

== Pyramid scheme allegations ==
Critics of the company's structure have contended that it has operated as a pyramid scheme. They have also argued that the company does not sufficiently work to curb abuses by individual distributors, though Herbalife Nutrition has consistently denied the allegations.

A 2004 settlement resolved a class-action suit on behalf of 8,700 former and current distributors who accused the company and distributors of "essentially running a pyramid scheme". A total of $6 million was to be paid out, with defendants not admitting guilt.

In November 2011, the Commercial Court in Brussels, Belgium, ruled that Herbalife was an illegal pyramid scheme. The company filed an appeal on March 8, 2012. On December 3, 2013, a Belgian appeals court found for Herbalife, reversing the lower court's finding.

On May 1, 2012, a short seller, David Einhorn, asked questions about the company's business and sales models during the Q1 earnings call, setting off suspicions that Einhorn had a short position. These suspicions were proved correct in January 2013 when at an investor meeting Einhorn revealed that he had profited through a short position against the company. Einhorn said the short had been closed before the end of 2012.

=== Bill Ackman and Carl Icahn ===
On December 20, 2012, Bill Ackman (of Pershing Square Capital) presented a series of arguments outlining why his firm believed that Herbalife operated a "sophisticated pyramid scheme" and contended that its stock would hit zero. Ackman alleged after a year-long investigation that the majority of distributors lose money, that the chance of making the testimonial-implied headline income is approximately one in five thousand, and that the company materially overstates its distributors' retail sales and understates their recruiting rewards.

In January 2013, Carl Icahn, investor and founder of Icahn Capital Management, disclosed that he had taken a stake in Herbalife, although he initially declined to publicly state whether he had taken a long position on the stock. Around the same time, Icahn criticized Ackman’s public campaign against the company, alluding to a previous legal dispute between the two stemming from a 2003 stock-sale agreement.

On January 25, 2013, Ackman and Icahn engaged in an on-air exchange on CNBC’s Halftime Report after Icahn called into the show where Ackman was already appearing as a guest. During the 27-minute long exchange, Icahn accused Ackman of orchestrating a bear raid on Herbalife for his own financial gain and called him "a major loser", while Ackman defended his research into the company and argued that Icahn had pursued similar short-selling tactics earlier in his career. The confrontation, drew widespread attention as one of the most discussed moments in financial television history. While the segment aired, trading volume on the New York Stock Exchange reportedly fell more than 20%.

According to a number of financial commentators, Ackman bet roughly $1 billion against the company; soon after remarks to the press, the price of the stock decreased such that Ackman would have made $300 million if he had closed his short position then. In March 2015, federal prosecutors and the FBI revealed that they were investigating whether or not individuals paid by Ackman and otherwise had made false statements about Herbalife's business model to regulators and others in order to lower the company's stock price and influence authorities to conduct an investigation.

In November 2017, Ackman closed out his short position after Herbalife shares increased by 51 percent over the year, and replaced it with a less aggressive put option. In March 2018, The Wall Street Journal reported that Ackman had "largely exited" his bet against the company, while others reported that the bet against Herbalife had cost his company hundreds of millions of dollars and damaged the confidence of investors in his hedge fund.

=== FTC investigation ===
Based on information from a Freedom of Information Act (FOIA) request, the New York Post reported on February 4, 2013, that Herbalife was subject to a pending probe from the Federal Trade Commission (FTC). The FTC released 729 pages containing 192 complaints received over a seven-year period in regards to the New York Post's FOIA request. The FTC stated that the wording in its response to the FOIA request was incorrect; the FTC could not confirm or deny an investigation into Herbalife.

In March 2014, the FTC opened an investigation into Herbalife in response to calls from consumer groups and members in both houses of the United States Congress. Herbalife responded to the probe by saying it "welcomes the inquiry given the tremendous amount of misinformation in the marketplace, and will cooperate fully with the FTC. We are confident that Herbalife is in compliance with all applicable laws and regulations". However, in the press conference, Herbalife was declared not necessarily not a pyramid scheme.

In July 2016, Herbalife agreed to modify its business model and pay $200 million in a settlement with the FTC. Partial refund checks were mailed to roughly 350,000 Herbalife distributors in January 2017. The FTC said in a press release about the settlement "it's virtually impossible to make money selling Herbalife products."

The lawsuit alleged Herbalife deceived consumers into believing they could earn substantial income from the business opportunity or big money from the retail sale of the company's products. In addition, the complaint charged that one of the fundamental principles of Herbalife's business model—incentivizing distributors to buy products and to recruit others to join and buy products so they could advance in the company's marketing program, rather than in response to actual consumer demand—is an unfair practice in violation of the FTC Act.

The company remained under investigation as of early 2019 both by the United States Department of Justice (DOJ) and the U.S. Securities and Exchange Commission (SEC) for corruption in China.

On September 27, 2019, the SEC announced Herbalife agreed to pay $20 million to settle charges of making false and misleading statements about its business model and operations in China between 2012 and 2018. The company did not admit or deny the charges but agreed to the settlement terms.

=== U.S. Department of Justice investigation of bribery in China ===
In 2019, the DOJ charged two of Herbalife's employees with conspiracy in violation of the Foreign Corrupt Practices Act (FCPA). They were accused of bribing Chinese officials to procure sales permits and influence an investigation into Herbalife. They were also accused of offering bribes to China Economic Net to influence media coverage. In response, Herbalife committed $40 million to resolve the issues, and began negotiations with both the DOJ and SEC. In August 2020, Herbalife agreed to pay $123 million to the DOJ and the U.S. Securities and Exchange Commission.

== Sports sponsorships ==
Herbalife has sponsored France's national volleyball team and the Major League Soccer club LA Galaxy since 2007 and has sponsored Cristiano Ronaldo since 2013. They sponsored FC Barcelona and Lionel Messi between 2010 and 2013. Herbalife has also sponsored the basketball club Herbalife Gran Canaria since 2012. In July 2020, Herbalife also sponsored the Guangzhou Charge of the Overwatch League. In addition to these team and player sponsorships, Turkish Women's Basketball Super League has been named 'Herbalife Nutrition Women's Basketball Super League' for three years starting the 2019-2020 regular season.

During the 2020 Summer Olympics, Herbalife Nutrition was a sponsor of the Olympic Committee of Israel and the Indian Olympic Association. In 2023, Herbalife became a sponsor of the Indian Premier League.

In 2023, the company became the main shirt sponsor of the Western Sydney Wanderers FC women's football team.

Herbalife has also sponsored Indian cricket star and former captain Virat Kohli since 2011-2025. They have also sponsored other Indian athletes including Smriti Mandhana, Manika Batra, Lakshya Sen, and Palak Kohli.

== Media ==
In April 2016, a documentary directed by Ted Braun, titled Betting on Zero, premiered at the Tribeca Film Festival. It explored the allegation from Bill Ackman that Herbalife was a pyramid scheme and personal stories of its distributors who lost their life savings. Hilary Rosen, a Democratic lobbyist and an adviser to Herbalife, questioned Tribeca's credibility after claiming that the film was "bought and paid" for by Ackman "to make good on his stock bet".

In 2016, a Last Week Tonight with John Oliver segment on multi-level marketing focused on Herbalife; it strongly condemned the company for its structure resembling a pyramid scheme and cited the FTC report, which implied the company had been operating illegitimately. Oliver criticized Herbalife for its exploitation of Latino communities, and overstatement of its products' health benefits. One reviewer wrote that it appeared to be largely based on Betting on Zero, and caused no immediate change in Herbalife's stock prices.

The 2018 book When The Wolves Bite: Two Billionaires, One Company, and an Epic Wall Street Battle by Scott Wapner discusses Ackman's short of the company and his battle with Carl Icahn. In the book, Wapner characterizes Ackman's decision to bet against Herbalife as dangerous, because it anticipated that the government would shut Herbalife down.
