= Universal Music Group =

Dutch-American music corporation

Universal Music Group N.V.

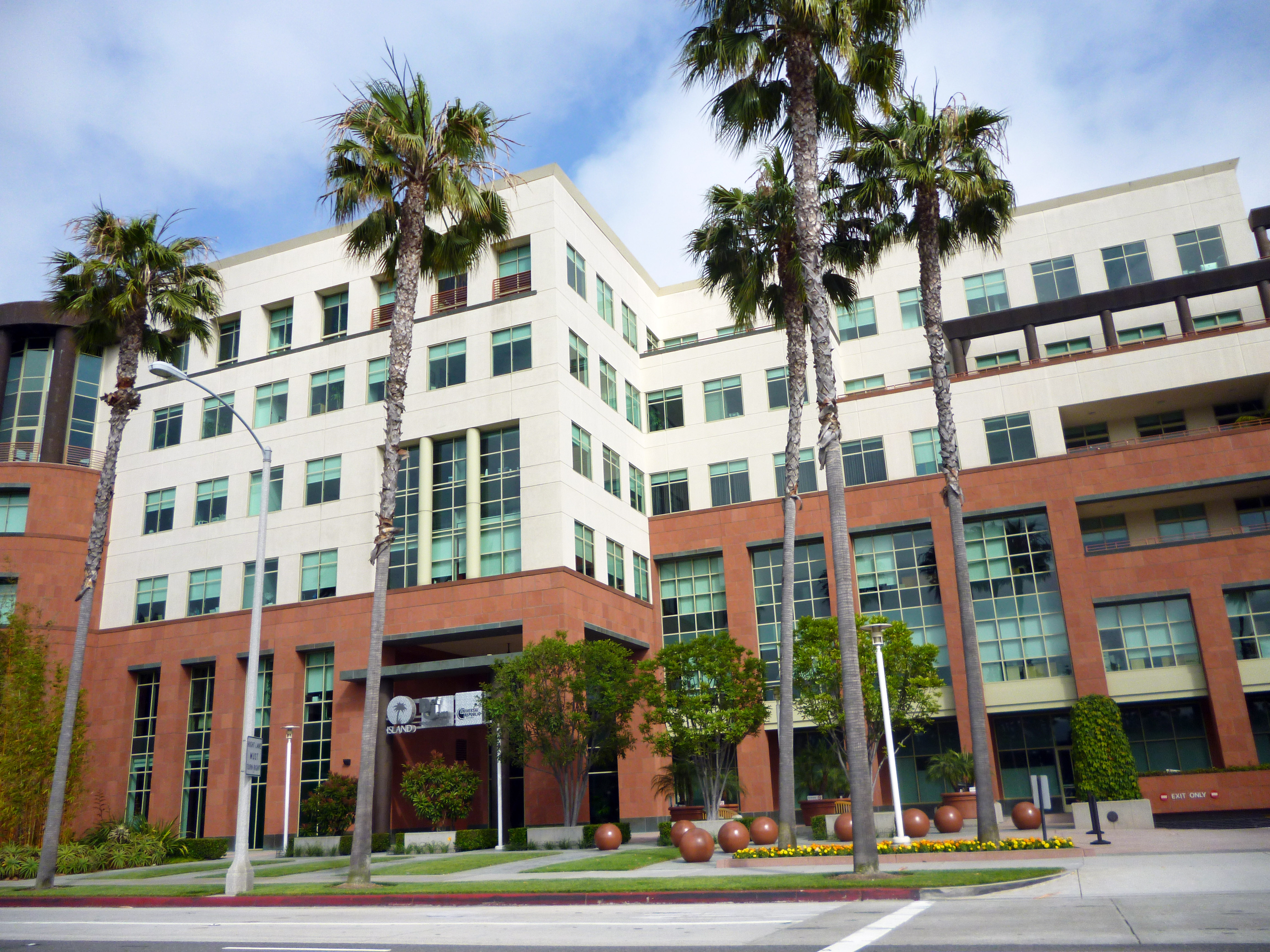
- Operational headquarters in Santa Monica, California
- Formerly: Decca Records (US business); MCA Music Entertainment Group (1989–1996)
- Type: Public
- Traded as: Euronext Amsterdam: UMG; AEX component
- ISIN: NL0015000IY2
- Industry: Entertainment; Music
- Founded: September 1934; 92 years ago (American branch of Decca Records); 1989; 37 years ago (as MCA Music Entertainment Group); December 9, 1996; 29 years ago (Current form)
- Headquarters: Hilversum, Netherlands (corporate); Santa Monica, California, U.S. (operational)
- Area served: Worldwide (except for Russia & Belarus)
- Key people: Sir Lucian Grainge (chairman & CEO); Sherry Lansing (chairwoman of the board)
- Services: Music publishing
- Revenue: ▲€11.108 billion (US$14.7 billion) (2023)
- Operating income: ▼€1.418 billion (US$1.88 billion) (2023)
- Owners: Bolloré family (28.3%) (Note: 18.4% directly and 9.9% through Vivendi); Tencent Music (11.4%); Others (60.3%)
- Number of employees: 8,319 (2018)
- Divisions: List of Universal Music Group labels
- Website: universalmusic.com

Universal Music Group N.V. (often abbreviated as UMG and referred to as Universal Music Group or Universal Music) is a Dutch-American multinational music corporation under Dutch law. While UMG's corporate headquarters are located in Hilversum, Netherlands, its operational headquarters are located in Santa Monica, California. As the biggest music company in the world, it is one of the "Big Three" record labels, along with Sony Music Entertainment and Warner Music Group. Tencent acquired ten percent of Universal Music Group in March 2020 for €3 billion and acquired an additional ten percent stake in January 2021. Pershing Square Holdings later acquired ten percent of UMG before its IPO on the Euronext Amsterdam stock exchange. The French Bolloré family still owns 28 percent of UMG (18 percent directly, and ten percent through Vivendi, formerly Vivendi Universal, the Bolloré family's investment company). The company went public on September 21, 2021, at a valuation of €46 billion.

As of April 2024, UMG's catalogue includes over three million recordings and four million compositions.

== History ==
=== Early history ===
The company's origins go back to the formation of the American branch of Decca Records in September 1934, and its name and company logo originate from Carl Laemmle's Universal Pictures. Although the movie studio and the music business share a common history, today the former is part of Comcast and the latter an independent commercial entity. During World War II, many record companies donated their metal masters to recycling for the war effort. However, Universal was an exception and donated more than 200,000 of their historic master recordings to the Library of Congress. The Decca Record Co. Ltd. of England spun American Decca off in 1939. MCA Inc. merged with American Decca in 1962.

In November 1990, Japanese multinational conglomerate Matsushita Electric agreed to acquire MCA for $6.59 billion. In 1995, Seagram acquired 80 percent of MCA from Matsushita. On December 9, 1996, the company was renamed Universal Studios, Inc., and its music division was renamed Universal Music Group; MCA Records continued as a label within the Universal Music Group. In May 1998, Seagram purchased PolyGram and merged it with Universal Music Group in early 1999. Seagram's entertainment assets were then sold to French media conglomerate Vivendi in 2000, along with UMG.

=== 2004: Consolidating into a Vivendi subsidiary ===
In May 2004, Universal Music Group was cast under separate management from Universal Studios, when Vivendi sold 80% of Universal to General Electric, who subsequently merged it with NBC to form NBCUniversal. This came two months after the separation of Warner Music Group from Time Warner. In February 2006, Vivendi purchased the remaining 20 percent of UMG from Matsushita Electric. On September 6, 2006, Vivendi announced its €1.63 billion ($2.4 billion) purchase of BMG Music Publishing; after receiving European Union regulatory approval, the acquisition was completed on June 25, 2007.

=== 2007–2012: UMG acquisitions and EMI purchase ===
In June 2007, UMG acquired Sanctuary, which eventually became UMG's entertainment merchandising and brand management division, Bravado. In 2008, Universal Music Group agreed to make its catalogue available to Spotify, then a new streaming service, for use outside the U.S. on a limited basis.

Doug Morris stepped down from his position as CEO on January 1, 2011. Former chairman/CEO of Universal Music International Lucian Grainge was promoted to CEO of the company. Grainge later replaced Morris as chairman on March 9, 2011. Morris became the next chairman of Sony Music Entertainment on July 1, 2011. With Grainge's appointment as CEO at UMG, Max Hole was promoted to COO of UMGI, effective July 1, 2010. In January 2011, UMG announced it was donating 200,000 master recordings from the 1920s to 1940s to the Library of Congress for preservation. In 2011, EMI agreed to sell its recorded music operations to Universal Music Group for £1.2 billion ($1.9 billion) and its music publishing operations to a Sony-led consortium for $2.2 billion. Among the other companies that had competed for the recorded music business was Warner Music Group which was reported to have made a $2 billion bid. IMPALA opposed the merger. In March 2012, the European Union opened an investigation into the acquisition The EU asked rivals and consumer groups whether the deal would result in higher prices and shut out competitors.

On September 21, 2012, the sale of EMI to UMG was approved in the European Union and the United States by the European Commission and Federal Trade Commission respectively. However, the European Commission approved the deal only under the condition the merged company divest one third of its total operations to other companies with a proven track record in the music industry. UMG divested Mute Records, Parlophone, Roxy Recordings, MPS Records, Cooperative Music, Now That's What I Call Music!, Jazzland, Universal Greece, Sanctuary Records, Chrysalis Records, EMI Classics, Virgin Classics, and EMI's European regional labels to comply with this condition. UMG retained the Beatles (formerly of Parlophone) and Robbie Williams (formerly of Chrysalis). The Beatles catalogue was transferred to UMG's newly formed Calderstone Productions, while Williams' catalogue was transferred to Island Records.

=== 2012–2017: EMI integration and divisions reorganization ===
Universal Music Group completed its acquisition of EMI on September 28, 2012. In November 2012, Steve Barnett was appointed chairman and CEO of Capitol Music Group. He formerly served as COO of Columbia Records. In compliance the conditions of the European Commission after purchase of EMI, Universal Music Group sold the Mute catalogue to the German-based BMG Rights Management on December 22, 2012. Two months later, BMG acquired Sanctuary Records for €50 million ($58 million). On February 8, 2013, Warner Music Group acquired the Parlophone Label Group (consisting of Parlophone Records, Chrysalis Records, EMI Classics, Virgin Classics and EMI Records' Belgian, Czech, Danish, French, Norwegian, Portuguese, Spanish, Slovak and Swedish divisions) for $765 million (£487 million). Later in February, Sony Music Entertainment acquired UMG's European share in Now That's What I Call Music for approximately $60 million. Play It Again Sam acquired Co-Operative Music for £500,000 in March 2013. With EMI's absorption into Universal Music complete, its British operations consist of five label units: Island, Polydor, Decca, Virgin EMI and Capitol. In the Greek market, as part of its divestiture plans, Universal Music retained Minos EMI and sold Universal Music Greece to Greek investors who renamed it Cobalt Music. Edel AG acquired the MPS catalogue from Universal in January 2014.

On March 20, 2013, UMG announced the worldwide extension of its exclusive distribution deal with the Disney Music Group, excluding Japan. As a result of this deal DMG's labels and artists have access to UMG's roster of producers and songwriters on a worldwide basis. The exclusive deal also saw UMG granted unlimited access to all rights pertaining to Disney's 85-year back catalogue of soundtracks and albums. On April 2, 2013, the gospel music divisions of Motown Records and EMI merged to form a new label called Motown Gospel. In May 2013, Japanese company SoftBank offered $8.5 billion to Vivendi for the acquisition of UMG, but Vivendi rejected it. In July 2018, JPMorgan said that UMG could be worth as much as $40 billion and then increased the valuation to $50 billion in 2019. In August 2013, UMG became the first company in the US to have nine of the Top 10 songs on the digital charts, according to SoundScan and weeks later, became the first company to hold all 10 of the Top 10 spots on the Billboard Hot 100 Chart. In September 2013, UMG received a SAG-AFTRA American Scene Award for the company's commitment to diversity as exemplified by its "entire catalog and roster of artists."

On April 1, 2014, Universal Music announced the disbandment of the Island Def Jam Music Group, one of four operational umbrella groups within Universal Music. CEO Lucian Grainge said of the closure, "No matter how much we might work to build 'IDJ' as a brand, that brand could never be as powerful as each of IDJ's constituent parts." Island Records and Def Jam operated as autonomous record labels. David Massey and Bartels, who worked respectively at Island and Def Jam Records, were named to the new record labels independently. Barry Weiss, who previously moved from Sony Music to lead Island Def Jam in 2012 when Motown was incorporated into it, stepped down from Universal Music. Additionally, as part of the changes to the labels, Motown Records transferred to Los Angeles to become part of the Capitol Music Group. Ethiopia Habtemariam, previously the label's vice president, was promoted to the label's president, chairwoman and CEO. Habtemariam vacated her position and left Motown on November 29, 2022. A month following the Island Def Jam disbandment, longtime Interscope Records CEO Jimmy Iovine departed from the label, which ended his 29-year relationship with UMG (which under the MCA banner, acquired Interscope for $200 million in 1995). Iovine's departure also made way for a restructuring at Interscope Geffen A&M Records, resulting in the hiring of Interscope chief operational officer John Janick as its new chairman and CEO. In 2024, UMG later restructured various labels into its respective "East" and "West" coastal group of umbrella units. Island, Def Jam, Republic and Mercury Records were reorganized under the New York City banner called Republic Corps., while Interscope, Geffen and Capitol Records were brought under the Santa Monica banner, alias Interscope Capitol Labels Group.

Universal Music Group entered into film and TV production with the 2014 purchase of Eagle Rock Entertainment. UMG's first major film production was Amy, which won an Oscar for Best Documentary, while taking part in Kurt Cobain: Montage of Heck and The Beatles: Eight Days a Week documentaries. In January 2016, UMG hired David Blackman from Laurence Mark Production, where he was president of production, as head of film and television development and production, and theater producer Scott Landis as special advisor on theatrical development and production. UMG Executive Vice President Michele Anthony and Universal Music Publishing Group Chairman and CEO Jody Gerson have oversight of the pair. On February 11, 2017, PolyGram Entertainment was relaunched as a film and television unit of Universal Music Group under David Blackman.

In 2015, UMG's Capitol Records earned all the major Grammy Awards for the year, with Sam Smith receiving Best New Artist, Record of the Year and Song of the Year awards and Beck winning Album of the Year. In March 2016, Universal Music Canada donated the archives of EMI Music Canada to the University of Calgary. In May 2016, UMG acquired Famehouse, a digital marketing agency. That same year, Paul McCartney and the Bee Gees both signed to UMG's Capitol Records, including their catalog releases. In April 2017, UMG signed a new multi-year licensing agreement with Spotify, the world's leading streaming service, and in May 2017, UMG signed a deal with Tencent, China's biggest gaming and social media firm. In July 2017, "Despacito" by Luis Fonsi, Daddy Yankee and featuring Justin Bieber, became the most streamed track of all time. By 2018, the song had broken several Guinness World Records, including Most Weeks at Number 1 on Billboard Hot Latin Songs chart and most-viewed video online.

In August 2017, UMG and Grace/Beyond agreed to develop three new music-based television series, 27, Melody Island and Mixtape. 27 would focus on musicians at the age of 27, an age at which several iconic musicians died. Melody Island was an animated series based on tropical island music with live craft segments. Mixtape had twelve episodes, with each episode connected to a song. In October 2017, UMG announced the launch of its Accelerator Engagement Network, an initiative aimed to help develop music-based startups around the world. In November 2017, USC Annenberg announced UMG's partnership in the "Annenberg Inclusion Initiative", becoming the first music company to do so. The initiative is meant to create change for representation of women and underrepresented racial and ethnic groups in the media industry.

In December 2017, Universal Music Group acquired Stiff and ZTT labels, along with Perfect Songs Publishing, from Trevor Horn's SPZ Group; BMG Rights Management, through Union Square Music subsidiary, retained its back catalogues. That same month, UMG signed a global, multi-year agreement with Facebook becoming the first of The "Big Three" to license its recorded music and publishing catalogs for video and other social experiences across Facebook, Instagram and Oculus. Sony and Warner signed similar contracts with Facebook the following year. Furthermore, on December 19, 2017, UMG signed a multi-year licensing agreement with YouTube.

=== 2018–2022: Continued growth, Tencent, public offering ===
In June 2018, Universal Music Japan announced an exclusive license agreement with Disney Music Group. With the addition of Japan, UMG distributes releases from Disney Music Group globally. In July, the Rolling Stones signed a worldwide agreement with UMG covering the band's recorded music and audio-visual catalogues, archival support, global merchandising and brand management. That same month, Vivendi announced it would explore selling as much as half of Universal Music Group to one or more investors. In Nielsen's 2018 US Music Mid-Year report, UMG made history with eight of the Top 10 artists, including all of the top five, as well as all of the top eight artists ranked by on-demand audio streams. In August 2018, UMG announced a strategic expansion in Africa, opening an office in Abidjan to oversee French-speaking Africa, and also unveiling a Universal Music Nigeria office in Lagos to focus on signing local artists and taking them global. In September 2018, singer Elton John signed a global partnership agreement with UMG across recorded music, music publishing, brand management, and licensing rights.

On November 19, 2018, singer-songwriter Taylor Swift signed a new multi-album deal with UMG, in the United States, her future releases will be promoted under the Republic Records imprint. In addition to the promised ownership of her master recordings, UMG agreed to, in case it sells portions of its stake in Spotify, distribute proceeds among its artists and make them non-recoupable. In December 2018, Queen's "Bohemian Rhapsody" became the most-streamed song from the pre-streaming era and the most-streamed classic rock song of all time. In February 2019, UMG fully acquired music distributor INgrooves. In June 2019, YouTube and UMG announced that they were upgrading more than 1,000 popular music videos to high definition, releasing them through 2020. In August 2019, Tencent and Vivendi started negotiation to sell 10% Vivendi's stake of Universal Music to Tencent. The deal is expected to be of $3.36 billion.

In February 2020, Vivendi announced it was planning to go public in an IPO within three years. On June 16, 2020, Universal rebranded Virgin EMI Records as EMI Records and named Rebecca Allen (former president of UMG's Decca label) as the label's president, bringing back the EMI brand. The same day, UMG announced launch of its new affiliates in Morocco and Israel. In July 2020, UMG signed a new multi-year licensing agreement with Spotify. In June 2021, Pershing Square Tontine Holdings, a special-purpose acquisition company run by investor Bill Ackman, announced it would acquire 10 percent of UMG before it went public, in a $4 billion transaction. The deal collapsed in July 2021 due to regulatory concerns, and it was announced that Ackman's Pershing Square Holdings would complete the purchase instead. In September 2021, IPO, Euronext Amsterdam announces an introduction price of €18,50 and Vivendi set an initial valuation for UMG at €33 billion ($38.3 billion). Vivendi distributed 60% of its UMG shares and retaining 10%. The family of French businessman Vincent Bolloré is revealed as the majority shareholder with 28% of UMG shares, through its holding company Bolloré (18%) and its subsidiary Vivendi (10%), headed by his son Yannick Bolloré. Tencent emerged as UMG's biggest corporate shareholder with 20% of shares. Pershing Square Holdings held 10% of UMG shares. In its IPO, UMG hits €54 billion ($62.6 billion) valuation which is over a third bigger than initial valuation.

In January 2022, UMG (through INgrooves) acquired the Icelandic record label Alda Music, which owned the rights to nearly 80 percent of all music released in Iceland. In February 2022, Universal Music Group announced a partnership with Curio, an NFT platform, to create NFT collections for its record labels and artists. On May 31, 2022, Universal Music Group announced Baa1/BBB long-term credit ratings from Moody's and S&P. In October 2022, Mercedes-Benz launched a new in-car audio collaboration with Apple Music and Universal Music Group. With this new audio standard, UMG allows its artists to base their song approval process on how the final mix sounds in a Mercedes‑Benz and introduced the "Approved in a Mercedes‑Benz" label as a standard. In November 2022, Universal Music Group acquired a 49% stake in Play It Again Sam (PIAS Group), which brings together a series of independent labels.

=== 2023–present: Sherry Lansing leadership; restructuring; M&A ===
In January 2023, Sherry Lansing was named the Chairman of Board of Directors of the Universal Music Group. In August 2023, it was announced UMG had acquired the UAE-based music marketing, digital publishing and distribution agency, Chabaka. In 2023, Universal Music Group and Deezer announced their initiative to explore potential new business models for music streaming that better recognize the value created by artists. Indeed, in September 2023, they announced their launch of an artist-centric streaming model designed to better remunerate the artists and music that fans mostly enjoy. Also in 2023, Universal Music Group introduced a HBCU scholarship program to support aspiring medical doctors.

In October 2023, UMG and BandLab Technologies formed a partnership to protect the rights of artists as well as songwriters and guarantee the 'ethical use' of Artificial Intelligence (AI). Also in October 2023, UMG formed a new partnership with BMG Rights Management to develop collaborative initiatives to enlarge opportunities for BMG-signed artists all over the world. Unable to reach a licensing agreement with TikTok, UMG removed its music from the platform in January 2024, During UMG's fourth-quarter earnings call on February 29, Grainge said: "There must not be free rides for massive global platforms such as TikTok." The company reported that quarterly revenue rose 9 percent, to 3.2 billion euros ($3.5 billion). Following the earnings call, UMG began a "strategic organizational redesign" that included company-wide layoffs.

In January 2026, it was announced UMG had acquired a minority stake in superfan platform Stationhead, following its merger with online music event platform Mellomanic. The merged company continues to operate under the Stationhead name, with private equity firm Sterling Partners holding a controlling interest and UMG entering into a commercial agreement to use the platform's technology.

Reported in early April 2026, minority shareholder Pershing Square offered about $60 billion to acquire UMG, to merge it with Pershing Square SPARC Holdings, and proposing to move its stock listing from Euronext Amsterdam to the NYSE.

In May 2026, Bolloré CEO Cyrille Bolloré urged Universal Music Group to reject Bill Ackman's takeover proposal, saying the offer undervalued the label, relied on the company's own cash and did not fit its long-term strategy. The deal was rejected by UMG's board of directors on May 29, 2026.

== Vevo ==
Universal Music Group co-developed with Google Vevo, a site designed for music videos inspired by Hulu, which similarly allows free ad-supported streaming of videos and other music content.

On May 24, 2018, Vevo announced that it would no longer continue distributing videos to Vevo.com, instead opting to primarily focus on YouTube syndication.

== Locations ==
=== Los Angeles metropolitan area ===
==== Santa Monica ====
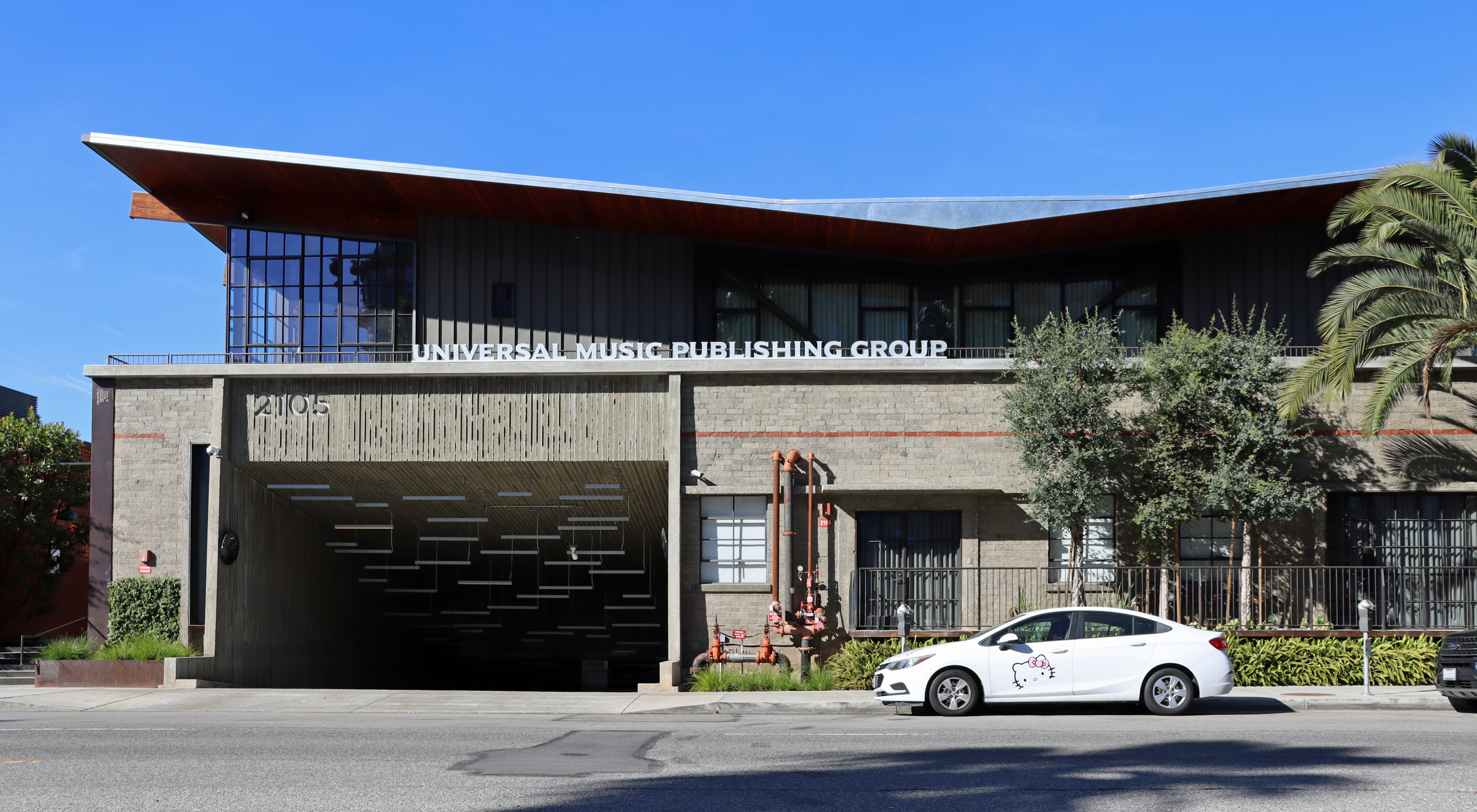
Universal Music Publishing Headquarters in Santa Monica, California

UMG's operational headquarters are located in Santa Monica, California. Interscope-Geffen-A&M and Universal Music Enterprises (UME), the company's catalog division, are headquartered in Santa Monica. Def Jam, Island and Republic Records also maintain offices there. UMG chairman & CEO Lucian Grainge is based at the company's Santa Monica offices. Universal Music Publishing is also headquartered in the city.

==== Hollywood ====
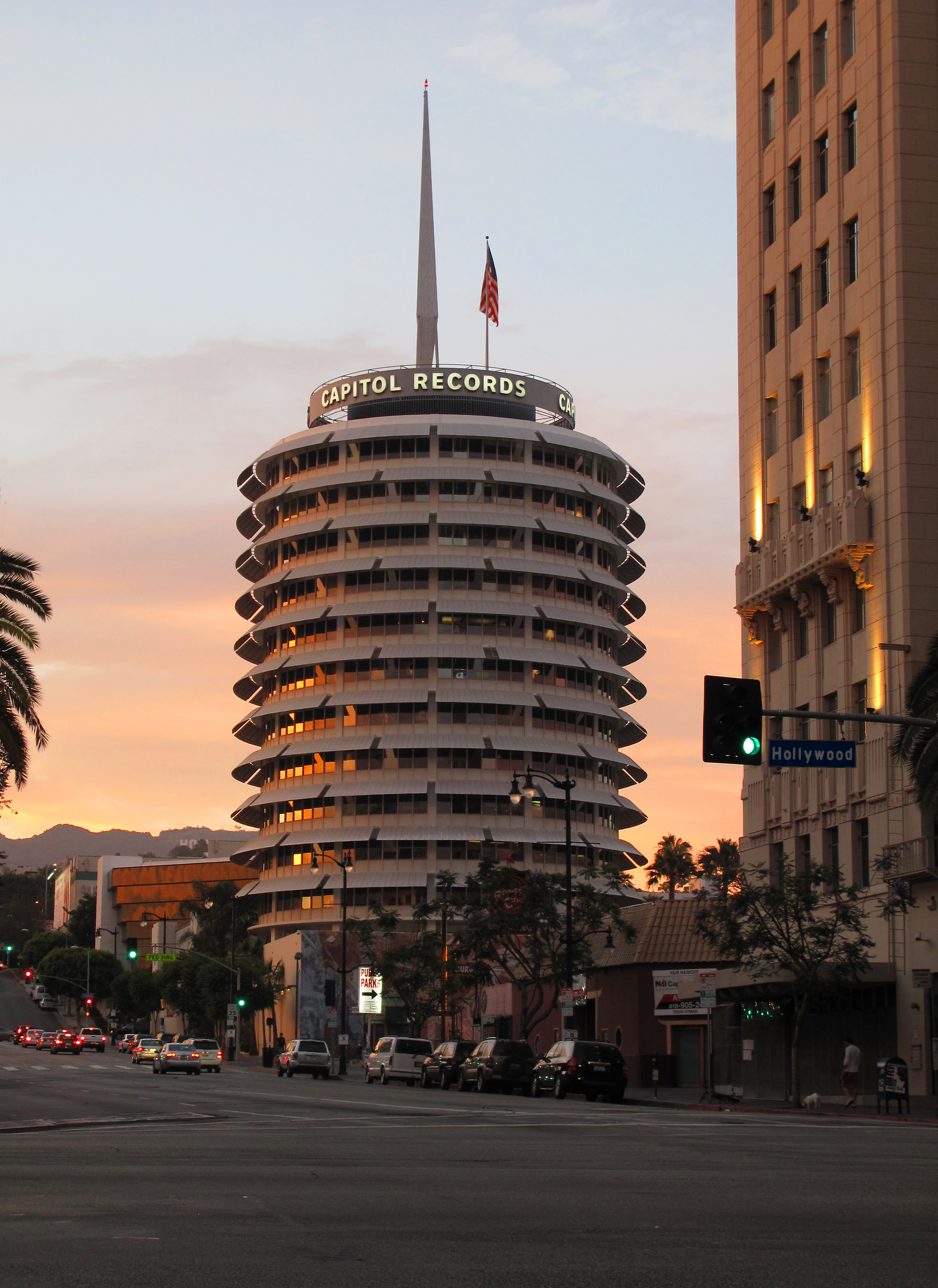
The Capitol Records Building

Capitol Music Group is headquartered at the Capitol Records Building in Hollywood. Universal Music Latin Entertainment is also headquartered in Hollywood.

==== Woodland Hills ====
Universal Music Group operates a secondary office in Woodland Hills that includes finance, royalty, and operations functions.

=== Miami ===
Universal Music Latin Entertainment is headquartered in Miami, Florida.

=== Nashville ===
Universal Music Group Nashville is headquartered in Nashville, Tennessee.

=== New York City ===
UMG has offices in New York City where Island Records, Def Jam Recordings, Republic Records, Verve Label Group, and Spinefarm Records are headquartered. By 2027, UMG will move its New York offices to PENN 2 which is adjacent to Madison Square Garden and above Penn Station.

=== Madrid ===
Universal Music Spain is based in Madrid, Spain.

=== London ===
Universal Music Group Global (formerly known as Universal Music Group International (UMGI)) operates offices in London.

=== Berlin ===
Universal Music GmbH, the German subsidiary, is headquartered in Berlin. It moved in 2002 from Hamburg to the district Friedrichshain at the river Spree. In February 2024 the company moved out of the iconic building also called "Eierspeicher" into another office down the street.

=== Warsaw ===
Universal Music Group's Universal Music Polska is located in Warsaw.

=== Toronto ===
Universal Music Group's Universal Music Canada is located in Toronto.

=== Japan ===
Universal Music Japan is headquartered in Shibuya, Tokyo.

=== Other locations ===
UMG operates in more than 60 territories around the world including Australia, Central America, Brazil, France, India, mainland China, Hong Kong, Taiwan, Sub-Saharan Africa, Central and Eastern Europe, New Zealand, Russia, Ukraine, South Korea, Singapore, Malaysia, Indonesia, the Philippines and more. Company's legal headquarters are in the Netherlands. Universal Music Group's largest corporate shareholder, Tencent, is headquartered in Shenzhen, China. Tencent's ultimate largest controlling corporate shareholder, Naspers, is headquartered in Cape Town, South Africa.

On March 8, 2022, UMG suspended all its operations in Russia, following the country's invasion of Ukraine. American rapper Offset announced on his Instagram in March 2025 that he would perform in Moscow, Russia, despite his label Motown (owned by Universal Music Group) suspending all operations in Russia. American rapper DaBaby also performed in Russia.

In 2023, UMG announced its expansion with its new office in Casablanca, Morocco.

In September 2025, the "No Music For Genocide" boycott initiative urged UMG to suspend its operations in Israel in protest of the genocide in Gaza.

== Finances ==
	2018	2019	2020	2021	2022	2023	2024	2025
Total revenue (€ bn)	6.0	7.2	7.4	8.5	10.3	11.1	11.8	12.5
EBITA (€ bn)	0.9	1.2	1.4	1.6	1.9	1.5	2.0	2.3
Net profit (€ bn)	0.9	1.0	1.4	0.9	0.8	1.3	2.0	1.5
Total assets (€ bn)	8.5	8.8	11.0	12.1	11.6	13.1	17.3	18.0
Total equity (€ bn)	3.0	3.0	1.4	2.0	2.4	3.0	4.6	4.6
Employees			9,183	9,505	9,992	10,290	10,346	10,595

== Shareholders ==
As of January 2022, the company's shares were held by:

- Bolloré family: 28%
  - Bolloré SE: 18%
  - Vivendi SE: 10%
- Tencent: 20%
  - Concerto Investment BV: 10%
  - Scherzo Investment BV: 10%
- Pershing Square Holdings: 10%

== Criticisms and controversies ==
=== CD price fixing ===
In 2000, music companies including UMG entered into consent agreements with the Federal Trade Commission, with no admission of liability, whereby they agreed to discontinue the use of Minimum Advertised Price programs under which subsidized cooperative advertising was provided to retailers that agreed to adhere to minimum advertised pricing.

In 2002, a similar settlement was entered into with music publishers and distributors Sony Music, Warner Music, Bertelsmann Music Group, EMI Music and Universal Music Group and certain retailers, without admission of liability or wrongdoing, with various states. In settlement of the claim, the companies collectively agreed to pay a $67.4 million fine and distribute $75.7 million in CDs to public and non-profit groups. It was estimated that consumers were overcharged by $500 million and up to $5 per album.

=== Payola ===
In May 2006, an investigation led by then New York Attorney General, Eliot Spitzer, concluded with a determination that Universal Music Group bribed radio stations to play songs from Ashlee Simpson, Brian McKnight, Big Tymers, Nick Lachey, Lindsay Lohan and other performers under Universal labels. The company did not admit guilt, but paid $12 million to the state in settlement, acknowledging "various employees and independent promoters acting on behalf of the company" engaged in the practice.

=== YouTube ===
In 2007, with the help of the Electronic Frontier Foundation, Stephanie Lenz sued UMG's publishing company for allegedly improperly requesting that, pursuant to the Digital Millennium Copyright Act, YouTube remove a 29-second home video in which Lenz's child danced to a recording of Prince's song "Let's Go Crazy". After years of litigation, the suit settled in 2018, prior to the court holding a trial on whether UMG had a subjective belief that the video was infringing and not fair to use before sending its request to YouTube.

In April 2016, UMG had the audio muted of a video clip showing Katherine Jenkins singing the British national anthem. They stated that the recording of "God Save the Queen" was copyrighted, and YouTube initially complied with this request, but subsequently offered the video with the original audio track.

=== Imeem ===
In December 2007, UMG announced a deal with Imeem that allowed users of the social network to listen to any track from Universal's catalogue for free with a portion of the advertising generated by the music being shared with the record label. All traffic was redirected to MySpace after that company acquired Imeem on December 8, 2009.

=== Universal archive fire (2008) ===
According to Jody Rosen of The New York Times, the fire which swept through Universal Studios Hollywood on June 1, 2008, caused "the biggest disaster in the history of the music business". In space rented from NBCUniversal, according to an official document marked "Confidential", the fire destroyed at least 118,230 "assets" (master recordings), or about 500,000 song titles, owned by UMG. "The vault housed tape masters for Decca, the pop, jazz and classical powerhouse; it housed master tapes for the storied blues label Chess; it housed masters for Impulse!, the groundbreaking jazz label. The vault held masters for the MCA, ABC, A&M, Geffen and Interscope labels; as well as some smaller subsidiary labels. Nearly all of these masters—in some cases, the complete discographies of entire record labels—were wiped out in the fire." In a statement issued on June 12, 2019, UMG said The New York Times article contained "numerous inaccuracies, misleading statements, contradictions and fundamental misunderstandings of the scope of the incident and affected assets."

Following the publication of the New York Times story, Questlove of The Roots confirmed that the master tapes for two of the band's albums, including unused material and multi-track recordings, were lost in the fire. Similarly, Nirvana bassist Krist Novoselic said he believed the masters for the band's 1991 album Nevermind were "gone forever" as a result of the fire. Representatives for R.E.M. announced they would investigate the effects the fire may have had on the band's archival materials, while Hole, Steely Dan, Rosanne Cash and Geoff Downes made statements on their possible losses from the fire.

A representative for Eminem confirmed that the rapper's master recordings were digitized months before the fire, but could not confirm whether the physical master reels of his recordings were affected. UMG archivist Patrick Kraus assured that the Impulse! Records, John Coltrane, Muddy Waters, Ahmad Jamal, Nashboro Records, and Chess Records masters survived the fire and were still in Universal's archive.

Howard King filed a lawsuit in Los Angeles on June 21, 2019, on behalf of Soundgarden, Hole, Steve Earle, the estate of Tupac Shakur and a former wife of Tom Petty that seeks class action status for artists whose master recordings were believed to have been destroyed in the Universal Studios fire.

=== Megaupload ===
On December 9, 2011, Megaupload published a music video titled: "The Mega Song", showing artists including Kanye West, Snoop Dogg, Alicia Keys and will.i.am endorsing the company. The music video was also uploaded to YouTube, but was removed following a takedown request by UMG. Megaupload said that the video contained no infringing content, commenting: "we have signed agreements with every featured artist for this campaign". Megaupload requested an apology from UMG, and filed a lawsuit against the company in the United States District Court for the Northern District of California, on December 12, 2011.

UMG denied that the takedown was ordered under the terms of the Digital Millennium Copyright Act, and said that the takedown was "pursuant to the UMG-YouTube agreement," which gives UMG "the right to block or remove user-posted videos through YouTube's CMS (Content Management System) based on a number of contractually specified criteria." The video was subsequently returned to YouTube, with the reasons for the UMG takedown remaining unclear. Lawyers for will.i.am initially claimed that he had never agreed to the project, and on December 12, he denied any involvement in the takedown notice. Megaupload dismissed its case against UMG in January 2012 following the closure of the site by US authorities.

=== Copyright termination lawsuits ===
==== John Waite ====
On February 5, 2019, John Waite and Joe Ely filed a class-action lawsuit against UMG claiming that the company was violating their right to terminate grants of copyright after 35 years in accordance with copyright law of the United States by ignoring Notices of Termination. On May 3, 2019, UMG filed a motion to dismiss the case, stating the Notices of Termination were not valid because the songs were not grants of copyright but works for hire. The motion to dismiss was denied.

==== Salt-N-Pepa ====
In May 2025, girl group Salt-N-Pepa sued UMG for the rights to their catalog. The duo said UMG has pulled its songs from streaming platforms in retaliation for its efforts to reclaim ownership of its masters starting in 2022. UMG again stated that the recordings were works for hire.

=== Removal of UMG songs from TikTok ===
On February 1, 2024, music released by UMG was muted or removed from TikTok after UMG and TikTok failed to reach a licensing agreement. The companies reached an agreement in May 2024 after which UMG's music was restored.

=== Allegations by Drake ===
In a November 2024 pre-action petition, rapper Drake sought discovery from UMG and Spotify because they may have illegally conspired to use bots and payola to artificially inflate streams of Kendrick Lamar's song "Not Like Us" in violation of the federal Racketeer Influenced and Corrupt Organizations Act and violated New York state law against deceptive business practices and false advertising. UMG denied the claims in a statement, calling Drake's legal arguments "contrived and absurd".

== See also ==
- List of record labels
- List of Universal Music Group artists
- List of Universal Music Group labels
