= Betting on Zero =

2016 film by Ted Braun

- Directed by: Ted Braun
- Produced by: Glen Zipper; Devin Adair
- Cinematography: Buddy Squires
- Edited by: Leonard Feinstein
- Music by: Pete Anthony
- Production companies: Zipper Brothers Films, Biltmore Films
- Distributed by: Gunpowder & Sky
- Release date: April 14, 2016 (Tribeca Film Festival)
- Running time: 98 minutes
- Country: United States
- Language: English

Betting on Zero is a 2016 American documentary directed by Ted Braun. It investigates the allegation that Herbalife is a pyramid scheme, and follows Bill Ackman's short investment in Herbalife, which is ostensibly a billion-dollar bet that the company will soon collapse.

== Synopsis ==
The documentary follows billionaire hedge fund manager Bill Ackman and several former Herbalife distributors after Ackman takes a billion-dollar short position in Herbalife, alleging it is a pyramid scheme destined to collapse. The film also chronicles Ackman's feuds with Herbalife CEO Michael O. Johnson and investor Carl Icahn, and the resulting controversy over both the short and Herbalife's business practices.

== Production ==
In addition to filming countless hours of cinéma vérité footage tracking Bill Ackman, anti-Herbalife activist Julie Contreras and others, director Ted Braun approached Herbalife CEO Michael Johnson, majority investor Carl Icahn, and current Herbalife distributors, but all declined to appear on film or on record. Instead, Braun sourced archival footage of these characters.

The film was produced by Zipper Bros Films, the company that produced Undefeated, winner of the 2012 Academy Award for Best Documentary Feature.

== Financing ==
At the time of its premiere at the Tribeca Film Festival in April 2016, the financing for Betting on Zero had not been publicly disclosed. However, subsequent to the FTC's formal charging of Herbalife in July 2016, John Fichthorn, co-founder of Dialectic Capital Management, revealed that he had financed Betting on Zero. Fichthorn previously held a short position in Herbalife, and when asked on CNBC's Fast Money Halftime Report if he would consider shorting the stock again he said he "absolutely" would. But since early 2014, when Betting On Zero went into production, he has had no position in Herbalife. An open critic of multi-level marketing companies, Fichthorn's firm, Dialectic Capital, held short positions in Nu Skin and Primerica as of August 2016. Bill Ackman, however, had no part in funding the film. Fichthorn financed Betting on Zero through Biltmore Films, a company he co-founded along with Burke Koonce to finance and produce business and financial films.

== Controversy ==
It was reported that Podesta and Partners, a lobbying firm run by Heather Podesta and retained by Herbalife, bought 173 tickets to an October 2016 screening of Betting On Zero at the Washington D.C. Double Exposure Investigative Film Festival in an attempt to keep the theater empty. This attempt by Podesta to subvert the screening was later lampooned by comedian John Oliver on the November 6, 2016, episode of Last Week Tonight.

Herbalife and others have openly criticized the film, arguing that the film ignores Ackman's questionable tactics, including his requests that government regulators shut down Herbalife. Herbalife also registered the movie's title as a domain (bettingonzero.com) and bought placement on Google's search engine for an ad (Betting on Zero Movie | A Misleading Infomercial | bettingonzero.com Paid For By A Billionaire Hedge Fund Manager), leading searchers to a web page with their rebuttal of the criticisms of the movie.

== Release ==
After premiering at the 2016 Tribeca Film Festival, Gunpowder & Sky Distribution, formerly FilmBuff, secured distribution rights and planned a theatrical release in early 2017.

== Reception ==
The film has been widely acclaimed, holding a 100% positive rating on Rotten Tomatoes. Fionnuala Halligan of Screen Daily wrote, "Even if it tells the age-old story of the filthy rich getting richer and the poor going nowhere, Betting on Zero is still rather shocking." Kimber Myers of IndieWire rated it a letter grade of "B" and wrote, "Betting on Zero takes a matter-of-fact approach to its material, but it makes a convincing and sometimes emotional argument against Herbalife." John Fink of The Film Stage commented, “The film evangelizes Ackman’s position and, in a certain context, can be seen as another prong in his attack on global nutritional multi-level marketing firm Herbalife. This, of course, is only a danger if you ignore the evidence presented by the film and your own gut instinct.”

The film was nominated for Best Documentary Screenplay from the Writers Guild of America.
