= Bill Ackman =

American hedge fund manager (born 1966)

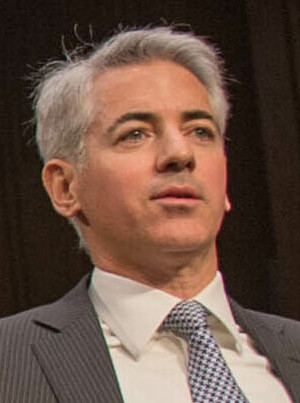
- Ackman in 2016
- Born: William Albert Ackman; May 11, 1966 (age 60); Chappaqua, New York, U.S.
- Education: Harvard University (BA, MBA)
- Occupation: Investor
- Title: CEO of Pershing Square
- Spouses: Karen Herskovitz (m. 1994; div. 2018) Neri Oxman (m. 2019)
- Children: 4
- Father: Lawrence D. Ackman

Signature
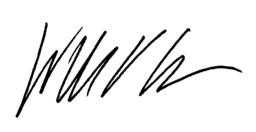

William Albert Ackman (born May 11, 1966) is an American billionaire hedge fund manager who is the founder and chief executive of Pershing Square Capital Management, an investment management company. He has been described as an activist investor. As of April 2026, Ackman's net worth was estimated at $8 billion by Bloomberg.

A long-time donor to Democratic candidates and organizations, Ackman endorsed Donald Trump in the 2024 United States presidential election. Ackman has been an active supporter of Israel, particularly following the October 7 attacks, and has criticized the 2024 pro-Palestinian protests on university campuses.

== Early life and education ==
Ackman was raised in Chappaqua, New York, the son of Ronnie I. (née Posner) and Lawrence David Ackman, the former chairman of a New York real estate financing firm, Ackman-Ziff Real Estate Group. He is of Ashkenazi Jewish descent.

He graduated from Horace Greeley High School in 1985. After high school, he graduated from Harvard College with a Bachelor of Arts, magna cum laude, in social studies in 1988. As an undergraduate, he wrote a senior thesis titled, "Scaling the Ivy Wall: The Jewish and Asian American Experience in Harvard Admissions". In 1992, he earned a Master of Business Administration (MBA) degree from Harvard Business School.

== Career ==
=== Gotham Partners ===
In 1992, Ackman founded the investment firm Gotham Partners with fellow Harvard graduate David P. Berkowitz. The firm made small investments in public companies. In 1995, Ackman partnered with the insurance and real estate firm Leucadia National to bid for Rockefeller Center. Although they did not win the deal, the bid generated interest in Gotham from investors, and three years later, Gotham had $500 million in assets under management (AUM). By 2002, Gotham had become entrenched in litigation with various external shareholders who also owned an interest in the companies in which Gotham invested.

In 2002, Ackman researched MBIA in order to challenge Standard & Poor's AAA rating of its bonds. At a billed cost of more than $100,000, his law firm copied 725,000 pages of statements regarding the financial services company to comply with a subpoena. Ackman called for a division between MBIA's structured finance business and its municipal bond insurance business.

He argued that MBIA was legally restricted from trading billions of dollars of credit default swap protection that it had sold against various mortgage-backed collateralized debt obligations, and was using a second corporation, LaCrosse Financial Products, which MBIA described as an "orphaned transformer." Ackman bought credit default swaps against MBIA corporate debt and sold them for a large profit during the 2008 financial crisis. He reported covering his short position on MBIA on January 16, 2009, according to the 13D filed with the United States Securities and Exchange Commission.

In 2003, a feud developed between Ackman and Carl Icahn over an investment deal. Ackman sued Icahn for his share of profits in a stock sale. In 2011, Icahn was forced to pay the $4.5 million plus 10% interest per year and legal fees, totaling $9 million.

=== Pershing Square Capital Management ===
In 2004, with $54 million from his personal funds and from his former business partner Leucadia National, Ackman started Pershing Square Capital Management.

In 2010, Pershing Square started buying J. C. Penney shares, paying an average of $22 for 39 million shares or 18% of J.C. Penney's stock. In August 2013, the two-year campaign to transform the department store ended abruptly when Ackman stepped down from the board due to a disagreement with fellow board members.

In 2011, Pershing Square began acquiring shares of Canadian Pacific Railway, eventually becoming the railway's largest shareholder. In November of that year, citing the company's poor financial performance, Ackman initiated a proxy contest with the goal of replacing CP's CEO and multiple board members. At the railway's annual meeting in May 2012, close to 90 percent of shareholder votes supported Ackman's dissident slate and much of the company's leadership was subsequently replaced. Following the successful proxy contest, The Globe and Mail's Report on Business Magazine named Ackman "CEO of the Year," stating that "no other CEO has had a bigger impact on how our publicly traded companies are steered than Ackman."

In January 2015, LCH Investments named Ackman one of the world's top 20 hedge fund managers after Pershing Square generated $4.5 billion in net gains for investors in 2014, bringing the fund's lifetime gains to $11.6 billion since its launch in 2004 through 2014.

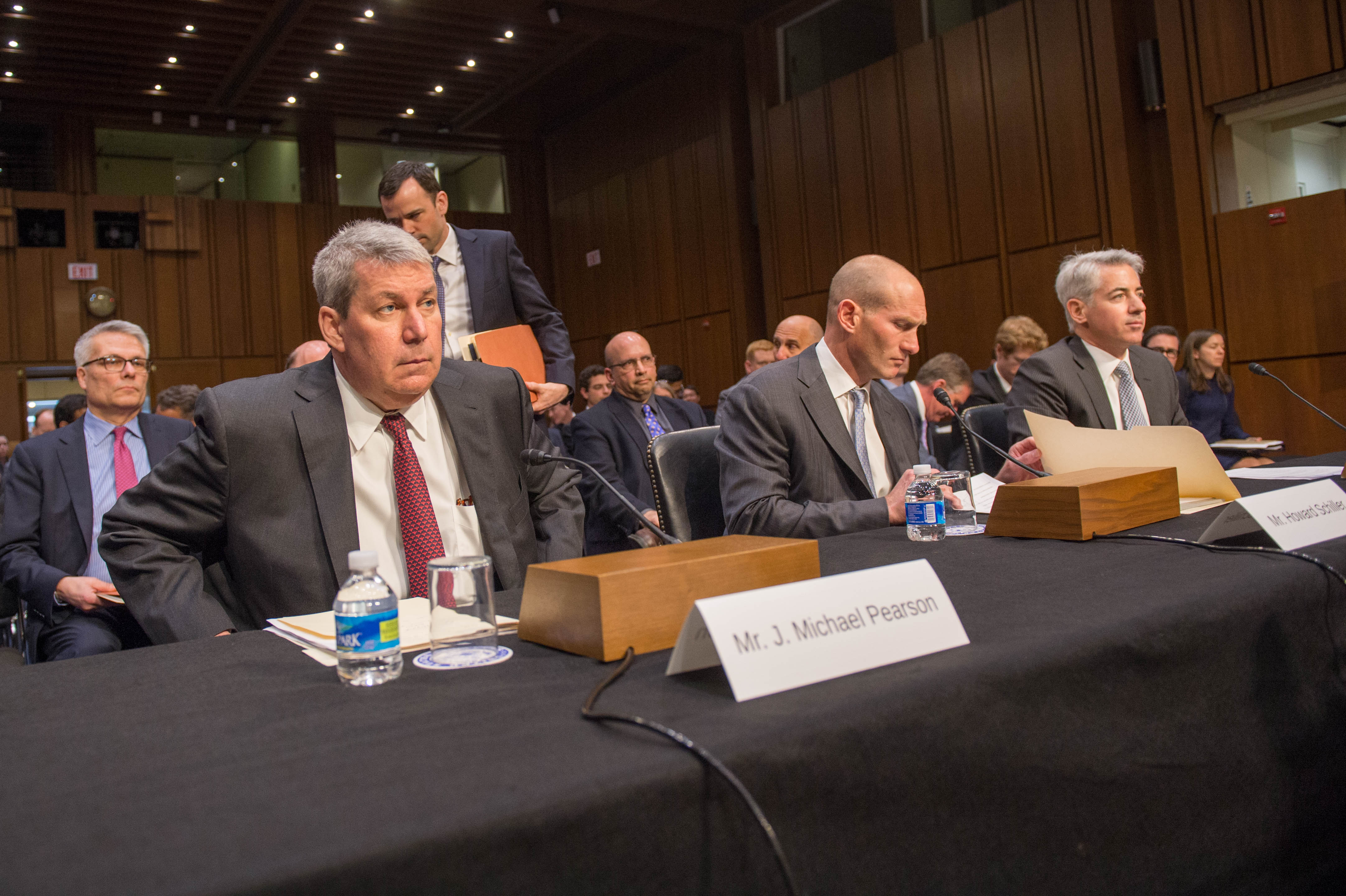
Ackman, Valeant CEO Michael Pearson, and Valeant CFO Howard Schiller testifying in front of Congress on April 27, 2016

On April 27, 2016, Ackman, along with Valeant Pharmaceuticals' outgoing Chief Executive Officer , J. Michael Pearson, and the company's former interim CEO, Howard Schiller, testified before the United States Senate Special Committee on Aging. The testifying panel answered questions related to the committee's concerns about repercussions to patients and the health care system posed by Valeant's business model and controversial pricing practices. Ackman sold his remaining 27.2 million share position in Valeant for about $300 million in March 2017 in what constituted a substantial loss. In 2017, Pershing Square paid $193.75 million to a group of Allergan shareholders as part of a $290 million settlement.

In 2016, Ackman began investing in Chipotle Mexican Grill, and the company was among Pershing Square's top holdings from 2017 to 2024. Ackman was credited with helping Chipotle rebound from years of losses by playing a part in hiring Brian Niccol as CEO in 2018.

In August 2017, Ackman acquired 8% of Automatic Data Processing (ADP) and launched a proxy fight to acquire 3 board seats. He lost the three-month proxy fight and exited the stock in 2019.

In 2021, Pershing Square acquired a 10 percent stake in Universal Music Group and, as of 2025, it is one of Pershing Square's largest positions. Prior to the initial investment, Ackman told Universal management that his grandfather, Herman Ackman, wrote a hit song in 1926 on Tin Pan Alley. It was later discovered that the song's recordings were owned by Universal, which then mounted and framed phonograph records and sheet music as a gift to Ackman. Ackman became a member of the company's board of directors in 2022, a position he retained until 2025.

In early 2024, Ackman aimed to raise capital to take a new fund known as Pershing Square USA public. However, after securing only $2 billion, he decided to withdraw the IPO on August 1, 2024. He announced plans to relaunch a version of the fund with a new transaction structure.

Ackman was chairman of Howard Hughes Holdings, one of Pershing's longest-held investments, from 2010 until 2024, when he stepped down from its board. In May 2025, Ackman rejoined the board as Executive Chairman after Pershing Square increased its investment in the company to 47%.

On August 8, 2026, Fortune reported that Bill Ackman's $35 billion hedge fund, Pershing Square Capital Management, maintains zero employee turnover among its 48 staff members. According to Ackman's interview on the Fortune Titans and Disruptors of Industry podcast, the firm maintains loyalty by offering multi-million dollar stock ownership to all employees—including janitors and receptionists—alongside extensive wellness perks and a unique two-month summer remote work policy.

==== Herbalife short ====
In December 2012, Ackman announced that Pershing Square had made a $1 billion short bet against Herbalife, a maker of weight-loss and vitamin supplements, calling the company a "pyramid scheme". A few months after Ackman's initial comments, billionaire investor Carl Icahn challenged Ackman's comment during a dual appearance by Ackman and Icahn on CNBC, during which both men insulted each other. Following this, Icahn announced a stake in Herbalife in January 2013. Over the following years, Icahn continued to buy Herbalife shares to combat Ackman's short.

Ackman's Pershing Square funded a persistent public relations campaign against Herbalife in an attempt to pressure state and federal regulators to investigate the company. He hired numerous lobbying firms, and had his team organize protests and letter writing campaigns. Ackman also paid organizations to help find victims of Herbalife, and personally lobbied Senator Linda Sánchez and the office of Senator Ed Markey, both of whom later sent letters to federal regulators. Following this campaign, the Federal Trade Commission initiated an investigation into Herbalife. Other regulators and law enforcement also got involved. In April 2014, Reuters reported that the FBI conducted a probe into Herbalife and reviewed documents obtained from the company's former distributors. On March 12, 2015, it was reported that federal prosecutors and the FBI were probing whether some people hired by Ackman made false statements in an attempt to encourage investigations and lower Herbalife's stock. Ackman was quoted that he would not back down from his claims against Herbalife. Neither Ackman nor Pershing Square were subpoenaed. The FBI probes into Herbalife and Ackman both failed to find sufficient evidence and were not pursued further.

In November 2017, Ackman said that he had covered his short-sell position, but would continue to bet against Herbalife using put options. On February 28, 2018, Ackman exited his near billion-dollar bet against Herbalife at a loss.

==== COVID-19 response ====
Ahead of the 2020 stock market crash, Ackman hedged Pershing Square's portfolio, investing $27 million to purchase credit protection, insuring the portfolio against steep market losses. To predict the crash early on, he sought advice in February from various scientists, including Nicholas Christakis, the renowned biostatistician at Yale. Pershing Square first disclosed the hedge on March 3, 2020. According to Reuters, "Ackman said hedging was preferable to selling off his portfolio of companies whose businesses are otherwise strong." The hedge was effective, generating $2.6 billion in less than one month.

On March 18, 2020, in a phone interview with CNBC, Ackman called upon President Donald Trump for a "30-day shutdown" of the American economy to slow the spread of coronavirus and minimize loss of life and ensuing economic destruction resulting from the shutdown. Ackman warned that without intervention, hotel stocks were "going to zero" and said that America could "end as we know it". He also cautioned U.S. companies to stop stock buyback programs because "hell is coming".

Ackman later received criticism for actively buying discounted equity stakes in the very companies he was warning could fail; however, Ackman already had realized roughly half of the gains before appearing during the CNBC interview.

In a November 2020 interview, Ackman said that he had grown concerned about COVID-19 because he had seen the film Contagion.

== Investment style ==
Ackman has said that his most successful investments have always been controversial, and that his first rule of activist investing is to "make a bold call that nobody believes in." But he also values investment stability in a style of Warren Buffett, as reflected in his development of "permanent capital" and strategic corporate structuring with conglomerates like Howard Hughes Holdings.

His most notable market plays include shorting MBIA's bonds during the 2008 financial crisis, his proxy fight with Canadian Pacific Railway, and his stakes in the Target Corporation, Valeant Pharmaceuticals, and Chipotle Mexican Grill. From 2012 to 2018, Ackman held a US$1 billion short against the nutrition company Herbalife, a company he has described as a pyramid scheme designed as a multi-level marketing firm. His efforts were reported in the documentary film "Betting on Zero".

After weak performance in 2015–2018, Ackman reworked his management of Pershing Square. The next year, Pershing Square returned 58.1%, which Reuters says qualified it as "one of the world's best performing hedge funds" for 2019.

Critics of Ackman have called him an oligarch, basing accusations on his use of market manipulation and use of his wealth to push for his own policy preferences, particularly with respect to Israel.

== Philanthropy ==
Ackman is a signer of The Giving Pledge, committing to give away at least 50 percent of his wealth by the end of his life to charitable causes. In 2006, Ackman, and his then wife Karen, founded the Pershing Square Foundation to fund innovative organizations focused on economic development, education, healthcare, human rights, arts and urban development and more. Since its inception, the foundation has committed more than $750 million in grants to more than 100 organizations. Grantees have included One Acre Fund, Saïd Business School's Oxford-Pershing Square Graduate Scholarships, Cold Spring Harbor Laboratory, Center for Jewish History, Innocence Project, African Parks and Planned Parenthood. Ackman and his wife, Neri Oxman, are the Foundation's co-trustees as of 2024. In 2011, Bill and Karen Ackman were on The Chronicle of Philanthropy's "Philanthropy 50" list of the most generous donors; Ackman was listed again in 2021 with Neri Oxman.

On March 15, 2021, he announced that he donated 26.5 million shares (valued at $1.36 billion) in American e-commerce company Coupang to three entities, one of them his own foundation. Coupang, while based in the US, primarily operates in South Korea.

In December 2022, Ackman auctioned a lunch with himself for charity in partnership with the David Lynch Foundation. The proceeds would go toward helping "New York's frontline healthcare workers, police and veterans who battle anxiety, depression, addiction and suicide every day", with Ackman matching the winning bid to support the foundation. The highest winning bid over prior instances was $210,000.

Ackman is a supporter of David M. Sabatini, a biologist who was previously fired by the Howard Hughes Medical Institute and resigned from the Whitehead Institute and MIT due to allegations and investigations of sexual misconduct. On March 1, 2022, at a Pershing Square Foundation event, he delivered remarks about what he called Sabatini's unfair treatment. In February 2023, Ackman announced that his foundation and an anonymous donor would together fund Sabatini US$25 million over five years to establish and run a new research laboratory.

Following the Bondi Beach shooting in December 2025, Ackman promoted a GoFundMe page raising funds for Ahmed Al-Ahmed, known for famously disarming one of the attackers. Al-Ahmed is a Muslim migrant of Syrian descent. Ackman later donated $99,999 to the campaign.

== Political stances ==
=== Support of Israel ===
Bill Ackman has expressed support for Israel's actions in the Gaza during the ongoing war, and signed a pledge "not to hire students who participate in demonstrations against Israel."

On October 8, 2023, following the October 7 attacks, several Harvard undergraduate student groups signed a letter holding Israel "entirely responsible" for the war in Gaza, arguing the Israeli apartheid was to blame, stating "for the last two decades, millions of Palestinians in Gaza have been forced to live in an open-air prison." The letter called on Harvard to "take action to stop the ongoing annihilation of Palestinians." In response, Ackman demanded the publication of the names of all students involved in signing the letter so that he could ensure his company and others do not "inadvertently hire" any of the signatories. Former Harvard president Larry Summers said Ackman's request for a list of names was akin to McCarthyism.

Ackman was a member of a long-standing WhatsApp group chat with Israeli military leaders and top US business leaders with the stated goal to "change the narrative" in favor of Israel by conveying "the atrocities committed by Hamas" and "help [Israel] win the war" on U.S. public opinion following U.S. protests against the Gaza war. Group members, including Ackman, worked with the Israeli government to screen a film titled "Bearing Witness to the October 7th Massacre", which shows footage compiled by the Israel Defense Forces portraying killings committed by Hamas on October 7. Screenings of the film were conducted in New York City and, with Ackman's help, at Harvard University, his alma mater.

In November 2023, Ackman supported Elon Musk after he expressed support for antisemitic remarks made by an X user who falsely asserted that "Jewish communities" supported "hordes of minorities flooding their country" and pushed "dialectical hatred against whites", describing it as "shoot from the hip commentary".

The same month, Ackman engaged in a campaign to remove Claudine Gay from her position as Harvard's president. He argued that her response to antisemitism was "insufficient" and amplified allegations that she engaged in plagiarism. After Gay resigned in January 2024, Ackman called for the resignation of Senior Fellow of the Harvard Corporation Penny Pritzker and other members of the board on Twitter, and described the university's diversity, equity, and inclusion movement as the "root cause of antisemitism at Harvard" and "racism against white people".

On January 3, 2024, Business Insider published an exposé detailing how Ackman's wife, Neri Oxman, plagiarized portions of her dissertation. A day after the article's publication, Oxman apologized for "citation errors" in portions of her dissertation. Ackman, in response to the article, pledged to conduct a plagiarism review of all MIT faculty, including MIT's president, Sally Kornbluth, who, alongside Gay, attended a congressional hearing on antisemitism in higher education.

On May 18, 2025, Ackman defended President Trump's defunding of science research at Harvard on the grounds of antisemitism on campus during a panel at the Center for Jewish History with Deborah Lipstadt and Leon Wieseltier. He also claimed there was evidence that university student protesters coordinated with Hamas and received support from foreign adversaries.

On June 14, 2025, Ackman posted a tweet on Twitter advocating for the US to join Israel in its war against Iran.

=== US politics ===
Ackman describes himself as a centrist. Historically, Ackman was a long-time donor to Democratic candidates and organizations, including Richard Blumenthal, Chuck Schumer, Robert Menendez, the Democratic National Committee, and the Democratic Senatorial Campaign Committee. During the 2024 United States presidential election, he donated to Chris Christie, Nikki Haley, Vivek Ramaswamy, and Doug Burgum in the Republican primary.

He endorsed Michael Bloomberg as a prospective candidate for President of the United States in the 2016 presidential election, but later voted for Donald Trump.

In 2023, Ackman expressed support for RFK Jr's anti-vaccine views, saying "I listened to RFK on several podcasts and a town hall and thought he raised important issues about vaccines and other issues that were worth learning more about (...) I don't feel like we've fully answered questions about the safety of all vaccines, particularly more recently approved vaccines, and our approach to determining their safety and efficacy."

Ackman supported the Democratic Party and endorsed Congressman Dean Phillips for the Democratic presidential nomination in the 2024 presidential primaries. On January 15, 2024, Phillips floated a possible Cabinet post for Ackman and Elon Musk in a forum with them. Following the suspension of Phillips' candidacy, Ackman donated to Robert F. Kennedy Jr.'s presidential campaign. In April 2024, Ackman announced via X that he would not support Joe Biden in the upcoming election because of what Ackman said was Biden's lack of concern with American hostages held by Hamas and his acting "as if this has not occurred." and that he was open to voting for former President Trump. On July 14, 2024, Ackman endorsed Trump in the aftermath of his attempted assassination.

On January 12, 2024, in an interview with CNBC's Andrew Ross Sorkin on Squawk Box, Ackman stated he no longer wanted to be associated with or part of the Democratic Party. Ackman was a supporter of Andrew Cuomo during the 2025 New York City mayoral election and an outspoken critic of his opponent Zohran Mamdani, who later won the election.

After the 2025 Brown University shooting, Ackman shared information falsely identifying a Palestinian undergraduate student as the shooter. Ackman shared a post calling to "Bring him to swift American justice." The post further declared a "war with Islam." A different individual, Claudio Neves Valente, was later named as the shooting's perpetrator.

In 2026, after a U.S. Immigration and Customs Enforcement (ICE) officer shot and killed Renée Good in her car in Minneapolis, Ackman donated $10,000 to a GoFundMe campaign for Jonathan Ross, the ICE agent who killed her. Ackman had shared a right-wing influencer's post about the fundraiser for Ross contemporaneously with his donation.

== Personal life ==
Ackman married Karen Ann Herskovitz, a landscape architect, on July 10, 1994. They have three children. On December 22, 2016, it was reported that the couple had separated.

In 2018, Ackman became engaged to Israeli-American designer Neri Oxman. In January 2019, Oxman and Ackman married at the Central Synagogue in Manhattan, and they had their first child together in spring 2019. In August 2019, Ackman wrote to MIT Media Lab director Joi Ito to discourage him from mentioning Oxman when discussing convicted sex offender Jeffrey Epstein, who had donated $125,000 to Oxman's lab.

Ackman owned a Gulfstream G550 business jet, as of 2017. He owns a $90 million penthouse apartment in Manhattan, among other residential properties.

=== Tennis ===
Ackman is an amateur tennis player who played on his high school team. He also played junior tennis, although not at a competitive level. During the 2010s, Ackman sponsored Frances Tiafoe.

Ackman received a wild card berth at the Hall of Fame Open in 2025 at the age of 59, where he lost in a doubles match with Jack Sock to Omar Jasika and Bernard Tomic. Professional tennis players and journalists, such as Andy Roddick, Martina Navratilova, and Jon Wertheim, criticized the decision to allow Ackman to play in a professional tournament and noted the disparity in ability between Ackman and the other players. After the match, Ackman offered a $10 million endowment to the International Tennis Hall of Fame, which declined the offer, fearing "appearance of impropriety". The money was instead donated to the Junior Tennis Champions Center.
