= Death and the Dervish (film) =

1974 Yugoslav film

- Directed by: Zdravko Velimirović
- Written by: Zdravko Velimirović; Borislav Mihajlović Mihiz
- Based on: Death and the Dervish by Meša Selimović
- Produced by: Milan Cvetković; Čedomir Ljubiša; Đorđe Milojević
- Starring: Voja Mirić; Bata Živojinović; Boris Dvornik; Olivera Katarina; Abdurrahman Shala
- Cinematography: Nenad Jovičić
- Edited by: Iva Kosi
- Music by: Zoran Hristić
- Production companies: Centar FRZ; Avala film Beograd; Bosna film Sarajevo; Filmski studio Titograd; Zeta film Budva; Kosova film Priština
- Release date: 12 July 1974
- Running time: 108 minutes
- Country: Yugoslavia
- Language: Serbo-Croatian

Death and the Dervish (Serbo-Croatian: Derviš i smrt, Serbian Cyrillic: Дервиш и смрт) is a 1974 Yugoslav film directed by Zdravko Velimirović based on the novel of the same name by Meša Selimović.

The film won the Silver Arena (second best film) and four Golden Arena awards at the 1974 Pula Film Festival, the Yugoslav national film awards festival.

It was Yugoslavia's submission to the 47th Academy Awards for the Academy Award for Best Foreign Language Film, but was not accepted as a nominee.

== Plot ==
The elder of the Islamic order of dervishes is deeply shaken by the arrest and execution of his innocent brother. In retaliation, the dervish manages to overthrow the ruling individuals, hoping to establish justice himself. The old administration, in which only personalities changed but not the spirit of governance, will shatter his illusions and crush his humanity.

== Cast ==
- Voja Mirić as Ahmed Nurudin (the dervish)
- Boris Dvornik as Hasan Dželebdžija
- Bata Živojinović as Muselim
- Faruk Begolli as Mula Jusuf
- Veljko Mandić as Kara Zaim
- Olivera Katarina as Kadinica
- Pavle Vuisić as Muftija
- Abdurahman Šalja as Tatarin
- Špela Rozin as Dubrovčanka
- Branko Pleša as kadija
- Rejhan Demirdžić as Malik
- Dragomir Felba as Hadži Sinanudin
- Ljuba Kovačević as runaway
- Ranko Gučevac as Muselim's servant
- Ivan Jonaš as jailer
- Janez Vrhovec as Dubrovčanin
- Rastislav Jović as stalker
- Usnija Redžepova as singer

== Awards ==
=== 1974 Pula Film Festival ===
- Golden Arena for Best Director (Zdravko Velimirović)
- Golden Arena for Best Supporting Actor (Abdurahman Šalja)
- Golden Arena for Best Cinematography (Nenad Jovičić)
- Golden Arena for Best Production Design (Vlastimir Gavrik)
- Silver Arena for second best film (Zdravko Velimirović)

== Legacy ==
The Yugoslav Film Archive, in accordance with its authorities under the Law on Cultural Heritage, declared one hundred Serbian feature films (1911-1999) as cultural heritage of great importance on December 28, 2016. Death and the Dervish is also included in this list.

The restored version of the film premiered on February 3, 2024 as part of the A1 Kinoteka project.

== See also ==
- Death and the Dervish
- Cinema of Yugoslavia
- List of Yugoslav submissions for the Academy Award for Best Foreign Language Film
