= Strange Girl (film) =

1962 film

- Directed by: Jovan Živanović
- Starring: Špela Rozin; Voja Mirić
- Release date: 17 February 1962
- Running time: 1h 43min
- Country: Yugoslavia
- Language: Serbian

Strange Girl (Serbian Cyrillic: Чудна девојка) is a 1962 Yugoslav drama film directed by Jovan Živanović.

== Cast ==
- Špela Rozin as Minja
- Voja Mirić as Nenad
- Zoran Radmilović as Pedja
- Ljubiša Jocić as Profesor slikanja
- Dragoš Kalajić as Boba
