= Death and the Dervish =

1966 novel by Meša Selimović

- Author: Meša Selimović
- Original title: Derviš i smrt
- Genre: Novel
- Publisher: Svjetlost, Sarajevo (original); Northwestern University Press (translation)
- Publication date: 1966 (original); 1996 (English translation)
- Publication place: Yugoslavia
- Media type: Print (hardback & paperback)
- Pages: 473
- Followed by: The Fortress

Death and the Dervish (Bosnian/Croatian/Serbian: Derviš i smrt, Дервиш и смрт) is a novel by Meša Selimović, published in 1966. It is his most successful novel. The story is noted for its philosophical themes and discussion of government corruption and morality.

In 1970, Selimović wrote The Fortress, an independent thematic sequel to Death and the Dervish.

== Plot ==
The novel is separated into two sections.

Sheikh Ahmed Nuruddin is a respected dervish in an Islamic monastery in eighteenth century Bosnia. He narrates the story as a kind of elaborate suicide note "from a need stronger than benefit or reason" and regularly misquotes (or misunderstands) the Quran, the sacred scriptures of his faith. He learns his brother Harun has been arrested by the Ottoman authorities but he struggles to determine exactly what happened and what he should do. Nuruddin goes to the kadi hoping to talk about his brother, but they talk about the qadi's brother, Hassan. It's St. George's Day and everyone is celebrating except for Nuruddin.

One evening, a fugitive from the authorities, Ishak, arrives. The Dervish hides him and starts comparing him to his own brother. Nuruddin tells Mullah Yusuf about the fugitive, but when Yusuf calls the police, they see that Ishak has already escaped. Ahmed and Harun's father arrives to visit his son in prison. Later, Ahmed meets Hassan and tells him why his brother was imprisoned. Haroun worked as a scribe and came across documents with prohibited information, for which he was arrested. Hassan suggests to Nuruddin that they go to the fortress and help Harun escape, but the dervish refuses because he believes in a just world and believes that the government will release him.

During a stroll, Nuruddin meets a man who threatens him to stop trying to free his brother. He returns to the khanqah and learns from Hafiz Muhammed that Harun was killed in prison three days prior. Nuruddin falls into despair and pays his respects to his brother after praying in the mosque. During another walk, four men attack him and take him to prison. He remains detained for ten days and starts to lose his grip on sanity. In a state of delirium, he sees Ishak, with whom he thinks he is talking. After the tenth day, he is released from prison.

The second part starts with Nuruddin talking about how he met Mullah Yusuf. Yusuf's mother was a prostitute and, while Ahmed was in the army, she was killed because of her relationship with an enemy soldier. He took pity on little Yusuf and took him with him to the khanqah. He talks to Hassan and Hafiz Muhammad about Yusuf. Muhammad tells him that he saw Mullah Yusuf near the kadi's house. Nuruddin realizes that it was Yusuf who betrayed Harun and that he ended up in prison because of him. Mullah Yusuf repents and asks for forgiveness, and tries to commit suicide. Nuruddin visits the fortress and brings food to the prisoners. He learns that he has been given permission to bury his brother. Nuruddin writes a lot about Hassan and his life, as well about his own education and misery after falling in love with a married woman.

A revolution takes place during which the kadi is killed. Nuruddin takes his place and is immediately forced to order Hassan's arrest. Hassan escapes and everyone is suspicious of Nuruddin's role in it. At the end of the novel, he meets a man and realizes that he is the son of the woman he fell in love with. Nuruddin reflects on the fact that he became a dervish because of this unfulfilled love.

=== Principal characters ===
- Sheikh Ahmed Nuruddin: the protagonist who is a religious everyman. He states that his name Ahmed means friend in Arabic, whilst Nuruddin means "light of the faith".
- Hassan: Nuruddin's principal friend outside the khanqah.
- Mullah Yusuf: the young student Nuruddin has brought into the khanqah as an orphan.

== Writing and publication ==
The novel was written over a period of four years (1962-1966). It was published in 1966 by the Sarajevo publishing house Svjetlost and quickly gained popularity in Yugoslavia.

=== Themes ===
The principal theme of Death and the Dervish is "malodušnost," or faint-heartedness, cowardice or indifference (the Slavic word means literally "diminished" or "reduced soul" – the Latinate English word "pusillanimity" has the same etymology and meaning). The most popular interpretation of this popular novel is that Selimović employed a fictional Ottoman setting to obscure a real critique of life in socialist Yugoslavia. Another important component is the fact that the story reflects a real-life incident in the author's own life, when his brother, Šefkija Selimović, a Partisan officer, was court-martialled and executed in late 1944 for allegedly taking requisitioned furniture for his own use after the liberation of Tuzla.

== Awards ==
The novel brought Selimović many of the highest Yugoslav literary awards, including the Njegoš award, the Ivan Goran Kovačić award and the NIN award.

== Critiques ==
The oldest novel strategy, first-person narration, proved to be the most effective in Selimović's case. Having applied this technique in Tišine as well, Selimović now, in Death and the Dervish, used it to its fullest and almost virtuosically. Its protagonist is an intellectual, a chronicler, a writer, an alert and receptive spirit who, while narrating a novel, simultaneously tells and comments on its origin, purpose, development, making Death and the Dervish a story about one man, about human destiny, and, also, a story about a novel, self-criticism and self-awareness that the work possesses. The novel has always been its own subject. Talking about himself and the world around him, the protagonist reveals himself in many ways: as a self-aware personality in the phenomenological sense, as a subject of pure introspection; he is shown as the bearer of the so-called point of view, as the manifestation of the consciousness and conscience of what is happening; and we finally see him as an active man, in the process of changing from a reflective to an active and affective, tragic personality. Selimović's dervish Ahmed is a great human and poetic creation.

— Miloš I. Bandić, Politika

The main character of this novel, Ahmed Nuruddin, a sheikh of the Mevlevi order, is moved from his peaceful, religious seclusion from the everyday world when he learns that his brother has been arrested. From that moment on, a tangle of many temptations is unwound in front of him, which will not only push him out of his spiritual surrender to religion, but will lead him to a series of actions that possess the character of a political struggle for power and authority. In this way, Dervish and Death shows the development and destiny of a man who, out of the most intimate needs, comes to a situation where, having abanonded one way of thinking and feeling, having left solitude and entered the world, he becomes a man of action, of life, and of experiential wisdom.

— Vuk Krnjević, Borba

== Film adaptations ==
In 1972 the novel was adapted into a TV drama by the same title, directed by Sava Mrmak.

A feature-length adaptation by the same title was made in 1974, directed by Zdravko Velimirović and starring Voja Mirić as Nuruddin.
