= Špela Rozin =

Slovene actress

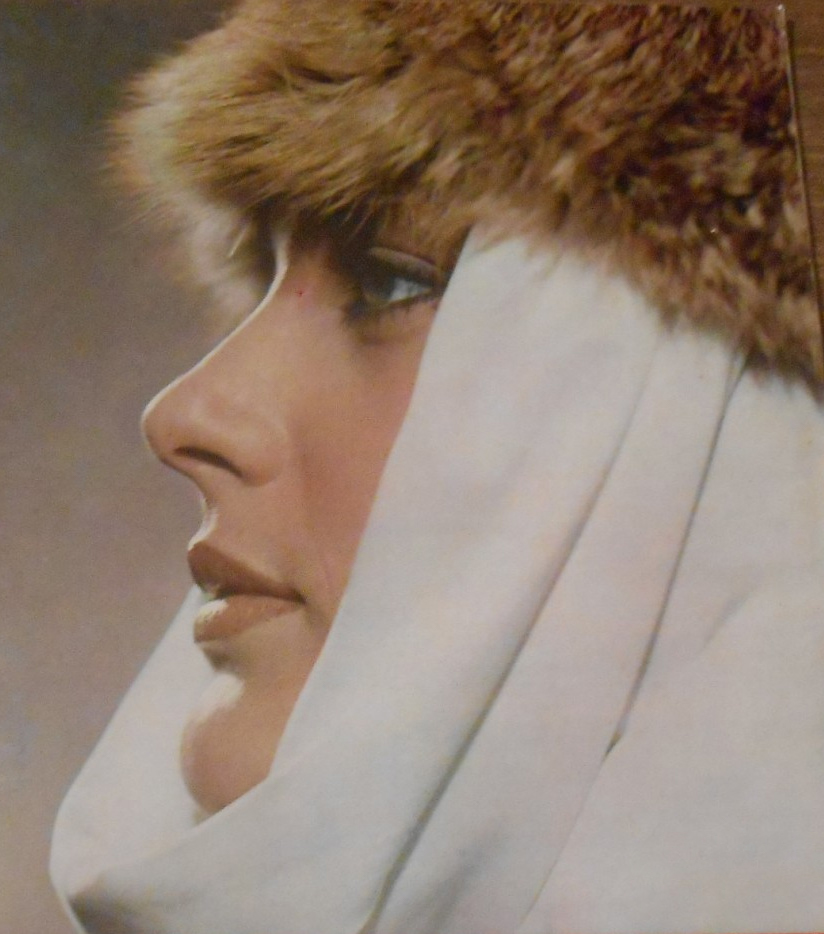
- Špela Rozin in 1969
- Born: 31 January 1943 (age 83); Lubiana, Kingdom of Italy
- Occupation: Actress
- Years active: 1959–present

Špela Rozin (born 31 January 1943) is a Slovenian actress who became famous in Yugoslavian cinema.

== Career ==
Her breakout role was the lead role in the film Strange Girl that became a cult classic because of the modern portrait of a young woman. Špela appeared in more than forty films since 1959 and she was also very popular in Italy because of the many peplum films she made there before coming back to Yugoslavia.

== Selected filmography ==
Year	Title	Role	Notes
1961	Nocni Izlet	Vera	
1961	Pesma	Ana	
1962	Strange Girl	Minja	
1963	Dve noci u jednom danu	Jelena	
1964	Hercules the Invincible	Telca	
1964	Hercules of the Desert	Selina	
1964	The Secret Invasion	Mila	Credited as Mia Massini
1966	The Climber	Bozica	
1966	Kako su se voleli Romeo i Julija	Jasna	
1967	Marinai in coperta		Credited as Sheyla Rosin
1967	Silenzio: Si uccide		Credited as Sheyla Rosin
1967	Nemirni	Vera	
1968	Vengeance	Jane	Credited as Sheyla Rosin
1968	Il sole è di tutti	Loredana	
1968	Io ti amo	Grace	Credited as Sheyla Rosin
1969	Battle of Neretva	Aide	
1969	Heads or Tails	Shanda	Credited as Sheyla Rosin
1970	Il magnifico Robin Hood	Rowina	
1974	Death and the Dervish		
1982	The Smell of Quinces	Marija	
