= Dragoš Kalajić =

Serbian painter, philosopher and writer

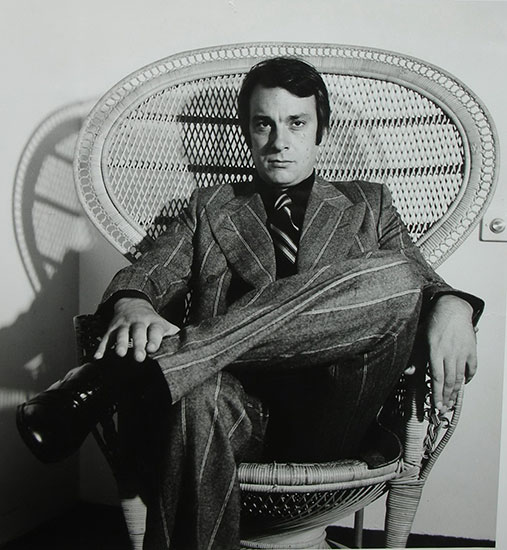
- Kalajić in 1976
- Born: 22 February 1943; Belgrade, Nazi-occupied Serbia
- Died: 22 July 2005 (aged 62); Belgrade, Serbia and Montenegro
- Occupations: Painter, writer, philosopher, journalist
- Spouse: Vesna Vujica
- Children: Sonja Kalajić
- Kalajić's voice
- Website: dragoskalajic.com

Dragoš Kalajić (Serbian Cyrillic: Драгош Калајић; 22 February 1943 – 22 July 2005) was a Serbian painter, philosopher, art critic, writer and member of the Senate of Republika Srpska. He was one of the most prominent Serbian nationalists throughout the 1980s and 1990s. He was a member of the Association of Artists of Serbia, the Association of Writers of Serbia and the Union of Russian Writers.

== Biography ==
Dragoš Kalajić was born on 22 February 1943 in Belgrade. His father, Velimir Kalajić was a Chetnik military judge, while his mother Tatjana Kalajić (née Parenta) taught mathematics at the Faculty of Mining and Geology, University of Belgrade.

He began his art studies at the Belgrade Academy of Fine Arts. He graduated in 1966 from the Accademia di Belle Arti di Roma with high accolades and gained international fame with his hyperrealist paintings. After completing his training he began living and working in Belgrade and Rome. While still a student, he held exhibitions in Rome, Milan, Brussels, and Belgrade. Between 1964 and 2004, he organized 18 solo exhibitions in Rome, Belgrade, Brussels, Zagreb, Modena, Milan, Bologna, Brescia and Sremski Karlovci. His paintings have been featured in a number of twentieth-century art anthologies, including Udo Kulterman's Neue Formen, Enrico Crispolti's L'avanguardie del dopoguerra in Europa and Miodrag B. Protić's XXth Century Serbian Painting. As a critic, Kalajić was involved in the creation of 10 exhibitions and a large number of TV shows about art, culture, tradition and politics (the most notable being the series "Mirror of the XX Century" and "Mont Blanc"). He received an award for young painters in Rome in 1964. His exhibition "Image Restoration", held in the gallery of the Cultural Center in Belgrade, caused controversy in the Yugoslav art scene. During the 1950s and 60s he was part of the art group Mediala. In 1962 he played Boba in Jovan Živanović's film Strange Girl.

In the 1980s, he started writing for Pogledi, the first oppositional magazine in Yugoslavia. Between 1968 and 2005, he published 18 books in Serbia, Croatia, Republika Srpska, Russia and Italy. These include The Map of (Anti)Utopia, The End of the World, American Evil, Europe Betrayed, Russia Rises and The Last European. He wrote forewords and edited a number of books on philosophy by authors such as Nikolai Berdyaev and Lev Shestov. He presented to the reading public for the first time the works of Plotinus, Julian, Denis de Rougemont, Lev Shestov, Gustav Meyrink, Bal Gangadhar Tilak, Otto Weininger and the collected texts of Leonid Šejka. He published studies on the works of Meyrink, Miloš Crnjanski, Emil Cioran, Rene Guénon, Julian, Tilak, de Rougemont, Holbein, Carlyle, Julius Evola, Anaïs Nin, Lawrence Conrad, Ilija Garašanin and others. He was also Tanjug's Italian correspondent. He edited three libraries: Kristali, Istok-Zapad and Superroman. He was the director of the "Progress" gallery in Belgrade.

During the rule of Slobodan Milošević, Kalajić published a column in the pro-government biweekly Duga. He was a senator of Republika Srpska in the first convocation of the Senate in 1996.

He died in Belgrade at the age of 62 on July 22, 2005. His remains were cremated on July 25.

== Views and personal life ==
Kalajić's political and cultural views, which were largely modeled after Julius Evola, have been described as "openly fascist" and anti-Semitic. He criticised Christianity and considered himself a pagan until the mid-90s when he converted to Serbian Orthodox Christianity.

He was friends with many prominent figures in the fields of art, literature, film and philosophy, including Evola, Ezra Pound, Alexander Dugin, Giorgio de Chirico and Gualtiero Jacopetti.

== Exhibitions ==
=== Solo exhibitions ===
- Galleria d'arte L'Obelisco, Rome (1964)
- Galleria del Levante, Rome (1967)
- Galerie Maya, Brussels (1967)
- Galerija suvremene umjetnosti, Zagreb (1968)
- Galleria Vinciano, Milan (1970)
- Museum of Contemporary Art, Belgrade (1973)
- Galerija Sebastian, Belgrade (1987)

=== Concept development for exhibitions ===
- Dimenzija realnog (A Dimension of the Real), Galerija Doma omladine, Belgrade (1967)
- Surovost kao ideal (Brutality as an Ideal), Galerija Ateljea 212, Belgrade (1967)
- Obnova slike (Renewal of the Image), Galerija Kulturnog centra Beograda, Belgrade (1971)
- Nova figuracija (New Figuration), Cvijeta Zuzorić Art Pavilion, Belgrade (1991)
- Beogradski pogled na svet (A Belgrade View of the World), Cvijeta Zuzorić Art Pavilion, Belgrade (1991)
