= Dervish =

Someone on a Sufi Muslim ascetic path

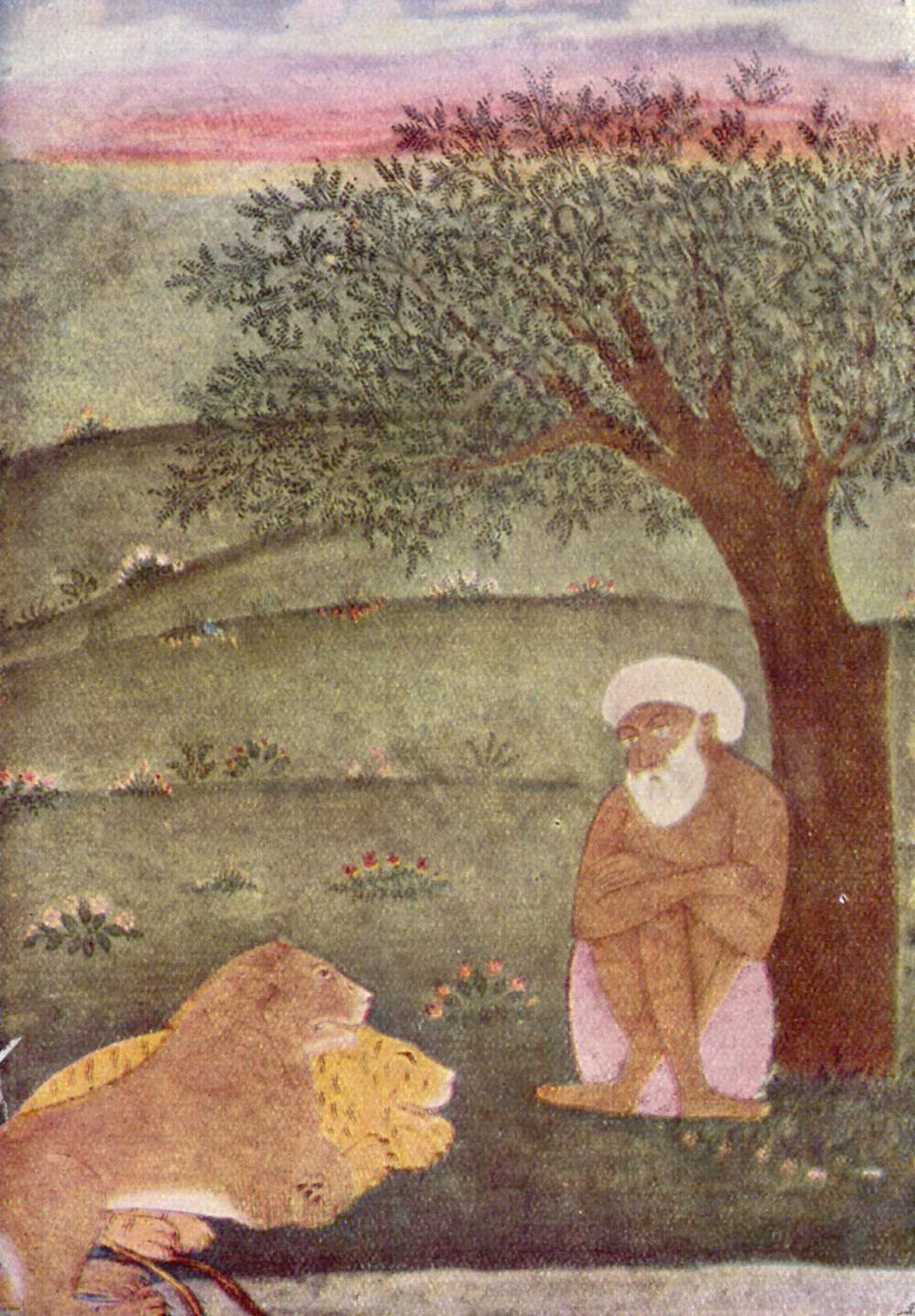
Dervish with a lion and a tiger, Mughal painting, c. 1650

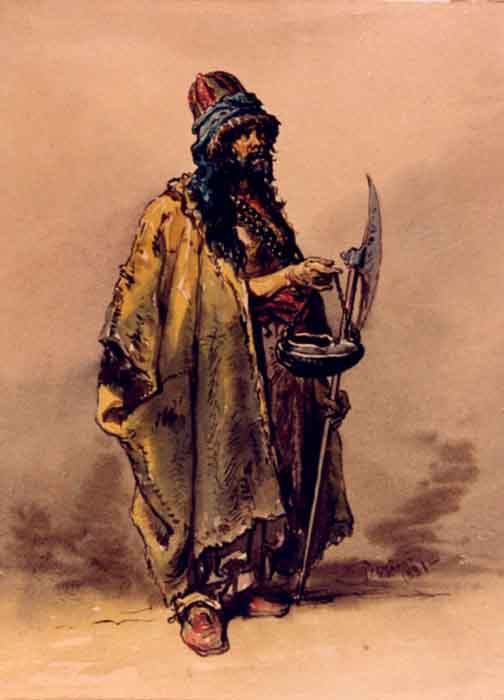
Ottoman dervish portrayed by Amedeo Preziosi, c. 1860s, Muzeul Naţional de Artă al României

A dervish, darvesh, darwēsh, or darwīsh (Persian: درویش, romanized: Darwēš) is a Muslim who seeks salvation through ascetic practices and meditations. It can refer to an individual or to a member of a Sufi order (tariqah). Their focus is on the universal values of love and service, deserting the illusions of ego (nafs) to reach God. This is usually done by performing a lifestyle which decreases bodily function to a minimum in order to attain what would be called "esoteric knowledge" in Western terminology. In most Sufi orders, a dervish is known to practice dhikr through physical exertions or religious practices to attain the ecstatic trance to reach God. Their most popular practice is Sama, which is associated with the 13th-century mystic Rumi.

For centuries, this was an individual practice, but in the 12th century, it began to be mostly practiced in fraternities. The oldest historical fraternity is the Qadiriyya order, founded by Abdul Qadir Gilani. According to Islamic beliefs, each order derives their history from the Islamic prophet Muhammad and are authorized by God (Allah) and taught by the angel Gabriel. The theology of such fraternities is always based on Sufism and can vary from quietism to anti-nomianism. Those adhering to law are called ba-shar and those who do not follow law are called bi-shar. In folklore, dervishes are often credited with the ability to perform miracles and ascribed supernatural powers.

== Etymology ==
The actual etymology of the term is unknown. The New Persian word darwēš (درویش) may derive from Middle Persian drayōš "poor, needy". The term has also been constructed from the composition of dar "door" and awēz "hanging", referring to someone who "hangs around doors," i.e. begs at the doors. However, the term drayōš contradicts this.

These proposed meanings belong to folk etymologies. Furthermore, there is no essential connection between begging and a dervish, and it is also said that a "true dervish" would abstain from begging.

Given the obscure etymologies in Persian dictionaries, and that it is mostly used in Central Asian, Turkish, and Persian cultures, it has been suggested that the term may be of Turco-Buddhist origin and derive from the terms dharani and arvis (Old Turkic), referring to a "specialist in magic", as they are credited as folk healers, engaged in healing, performance of miracles, protection spells and more.

== Religious practice ==
Dervishes try to approach God by virtues and individual experience, rather than by religious scholarship. Many dervishes are mendicant ascetics who have taken a vow of poverty, unlike mullahs. The main reason they beg is to learn humility, but dervishes are prohibited from begging for their own good. They have to give the collected money to other poor people. Others work in common professions; Egyptian Qadiriyya—known in Turkey as Kadiri—are fishermen, for example.

A study on dervishes among Bedouins reveals the process of initiation. It is believed that one does not choose to become a dervish, but is chosen to be one by God. This happens by receiving barakah, which happens during a dream or a conscious encounter with an angel. Barakah is usually received after an encounter with evil forces, supposedly manifesting in a preceding process of mental suffering. After receiving divine blessing, the gift might be forfeited if the dervish betrays God.

Dervishes also work as exorcists and healers. They are believed to be able to detect the presence of evil spirits, such as jinn and devils, by means of divine gifts. The exorcism can include negotiations or confrontations with the spirit in a spiritual world.

Some classical writers indicate that the poverty of the dervish is not economic. Saadi, for instance, who himself travelled widely as a dervish and wrote extensively about them, says in his Gulistan:

Of what avail is frock, or rosary,
Or clouted garment? Keep thyself but free
From evil deeds, it will not need for thee
To wear the cap of felt: a darwesh be
In heart, and wear the cap of Tartary.

Rumi writes in Book 1 of his Masnavi:

Water that's poured inside will sink the boat
While water underneath keeps it afloat.
Driving wealth from his heart to keep it pure
King Solomon preferred the title 'Poor':
That sealed jar in the stormy sea out there
Floats on the waves because it's full of air,
When you've the air of dervishhood inside
You'll float above the world and there abide...

== Whirling dervishes ==
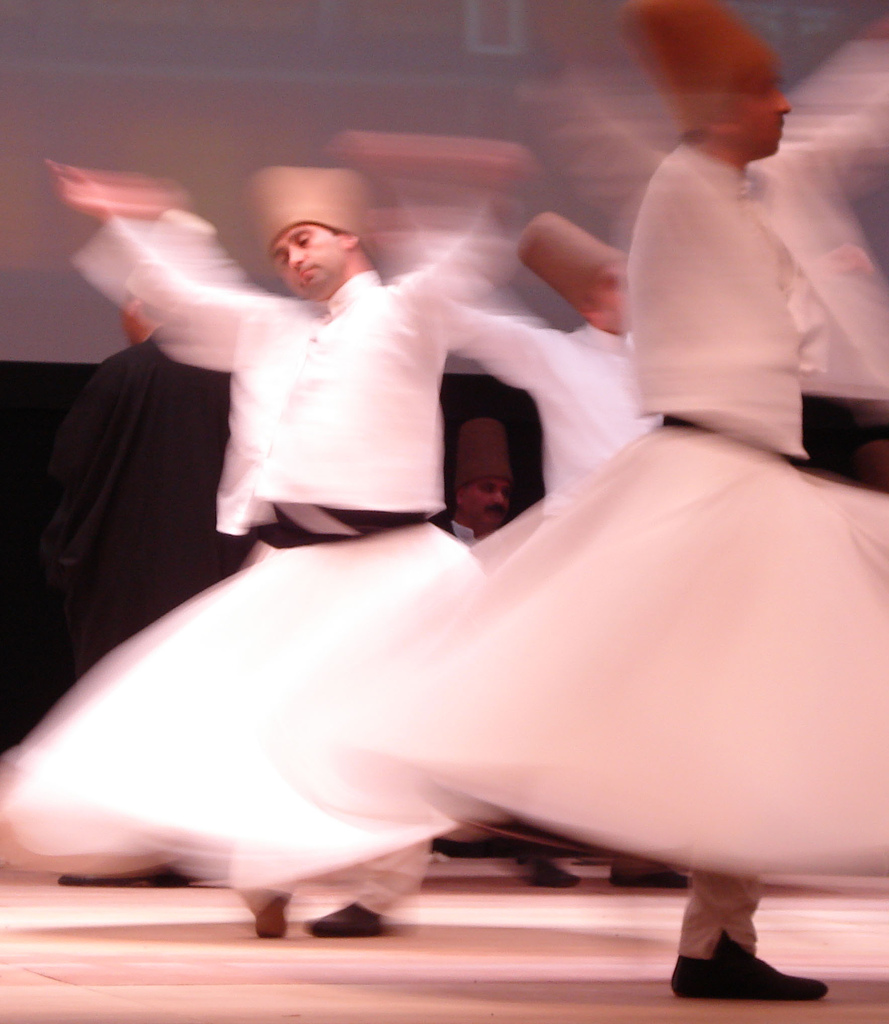
Whirling dervishes, Rumi Fest 2007

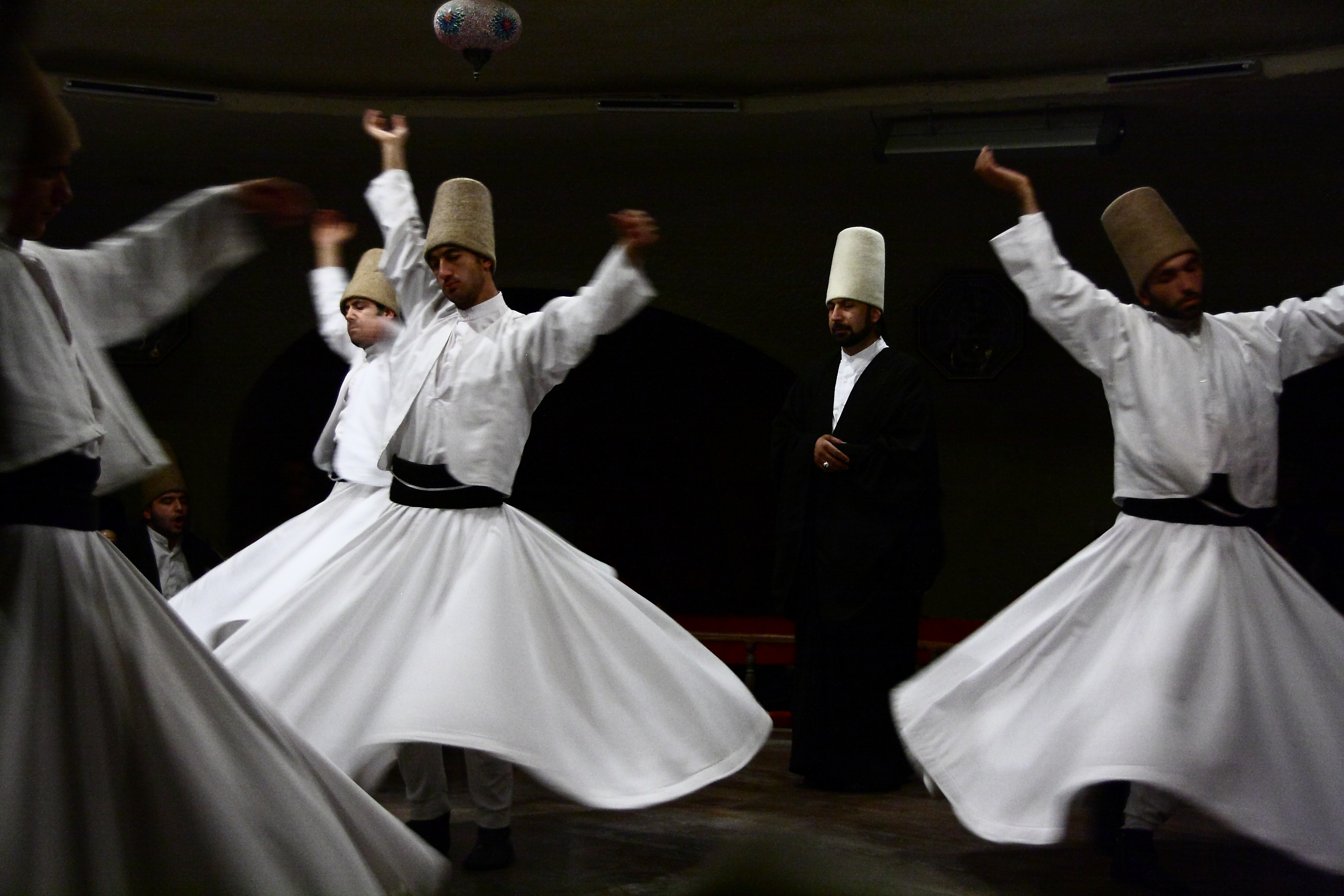
Sama ceremony at the Dervishes Culture Center in Avanos, Turkey

The whirling dance or Sufi whirling that is proverbially associated with dervishes is best known in the West by the practices (performances) of the Turkish-origin Mevlevi Order and is part of a formal ceremony known as the sama. It is, however, also practiced by other orders. The Sama is only one of many Sufi ceremonies performed to attain religious ecstasy (jadhb or fana). The name Mevlevi comes from the Persian-language poet Rumi, who was a dervish himself. This practice, though not intended as entertainment, has become a tourist attraction in Turkey.

== Orders ==
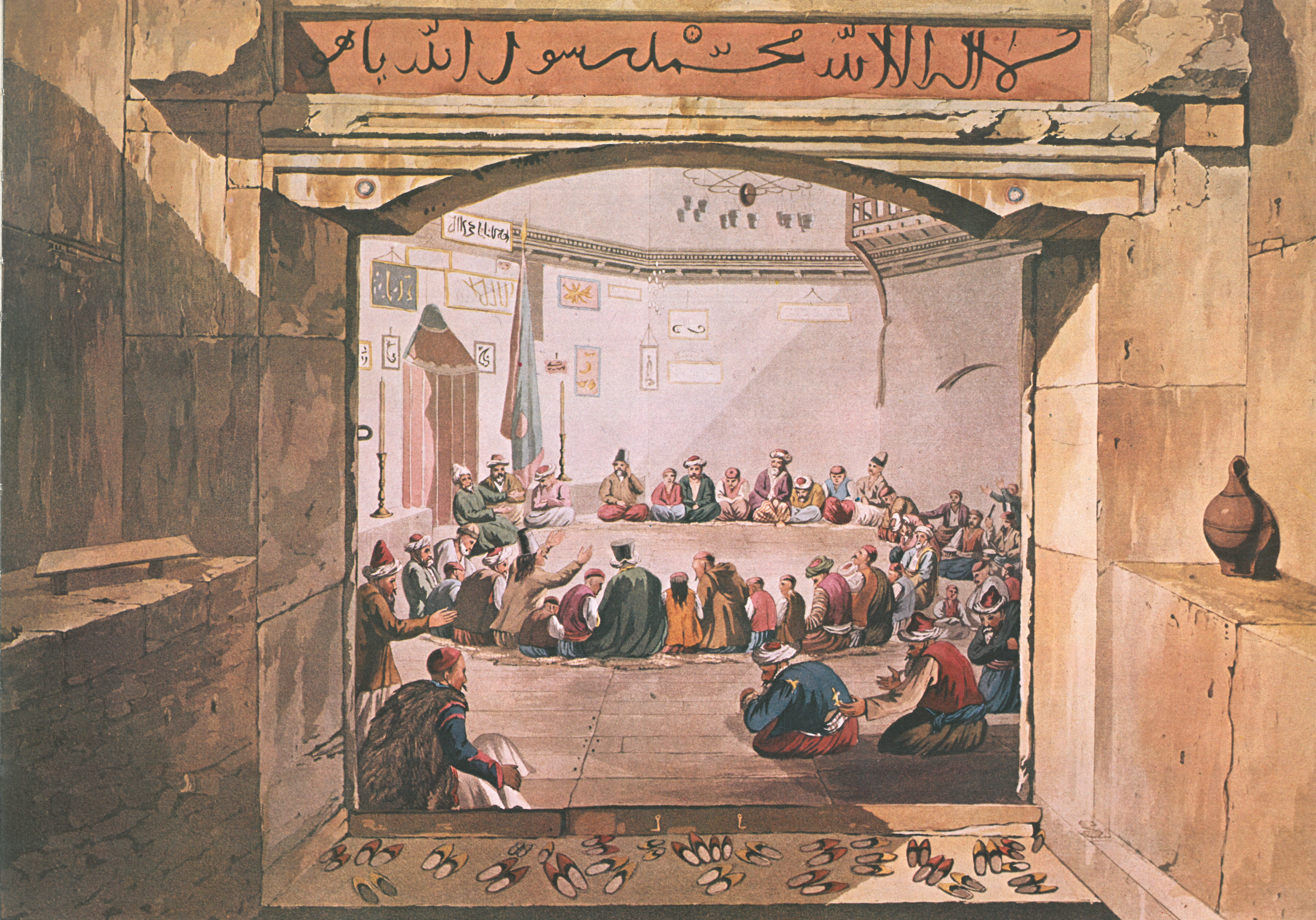
The dance of the dervishes, Athens, Ottoman Greece, by Dodwell

There are various orders of dervishes, almost all of which trace their origins to various Muslim saints and teachers, especially Imam Ali. Various orders and suborders have appeared and disappeared over the centuries. Dervishes spread into North Africa, the Horn of Africa, Turkey, Anatolia, the Balkans, the Caucasus, Central Asia, Iran, Pakistan, India, Afghanistan, and Tajikistan.

Other dervish groups include the Bektashis, who were associated with the janissaries, and the Sanusiyya of the Maghreb, which is comparatively orthodox in theology and otherwise orthoprax. Other fraternities and subgroups chant āyat (Qur'anic verses), play drums, or whirl in groups, all according to their specific traditions. They practice meditation, as is the case with most of the Sufi orders in South Asia, many of whom owe allegiance to, or were influenced by, the Chishti Order. Each tariqa (order) has its own garb and methods of acceptance and initiation, some of which may be rather severe. The form of dervishism practised during the 17th century was centred on esotericism, patience, and pacifism.

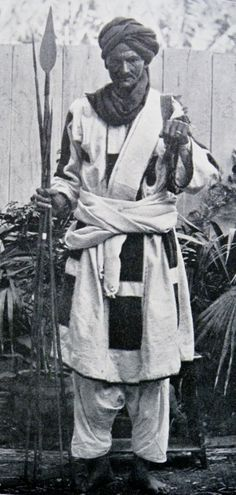
A Mahdist Dervish from Sudan (1899)

== In literature and art ==
Various books discussing the lives of Dervishes can be found in Turkish literature. Death and the Dervish by Meša Selimović and The Dervish by Frances Kazan extensively discuss the life of a dervish. Similar works on the subject have been found in other books such as Memoirs of a Dervish: Sufis, Mystics and the Sixties by Robert Erwin. Majdeddin Ali Bagher Ne'matollahi has said that Sufism is a core of being and bridge between religion and science. Winston Churchill uses the term in his autobiography My Early Life. The Whirling Dervishes painting by Mahmoud Sa'id (in 1929) sold in 2010 for USD 2,546,500. A Soviet-Azerbaijani movie from 1976 features a song called Dərvişin mahnısı, 'Song of the Dervish'.

== Views on Dervishes ==
Dervishes and their Sufis practices are accepted by traditional Sunni Muslims but different groups such as Deobandis and Salafis regard various practices of Dervishes as un-Islamic.

== Gallery ==
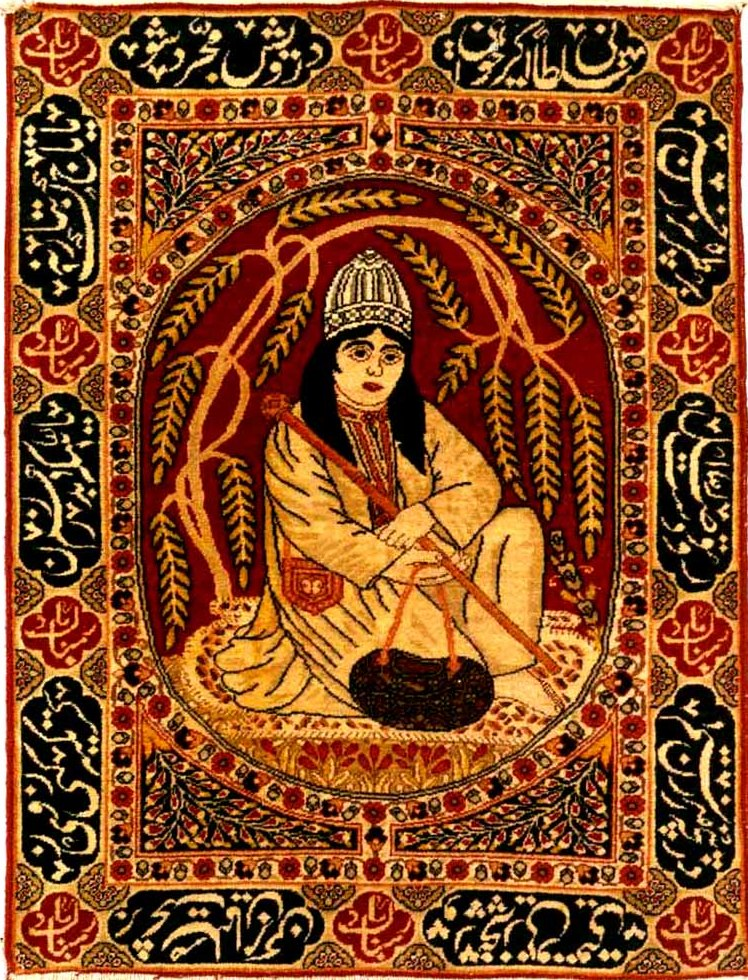
Dervish Azerbaijani rug, XIX c. Tabriz school, State Museum of Azerbaijan Carpet and Applied Art

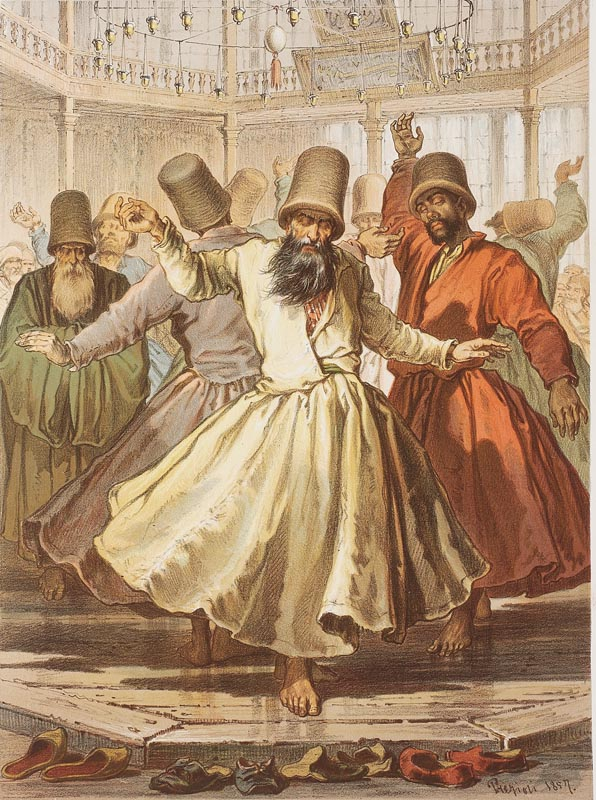
Ottoman Dervishes portrayed by Amedeo Preziosi in Istanbul, 1857

A Qajar-era Persian dervish, seen here from an 1873 depiction of Tehran's Grand Bazaar

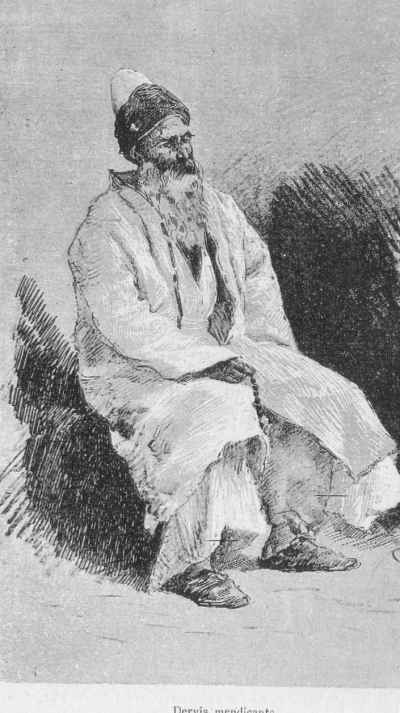
An Ottoman Dervish in Istanbul, 1878

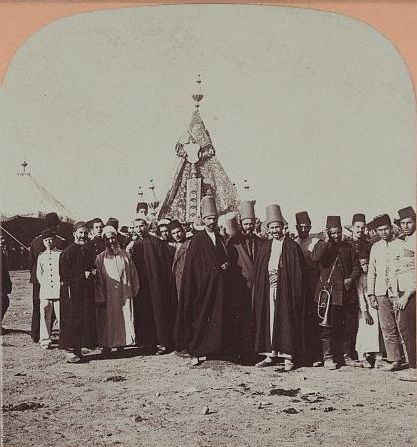
Dervishes photographed by William H. Rau near Damascus, c. 1903

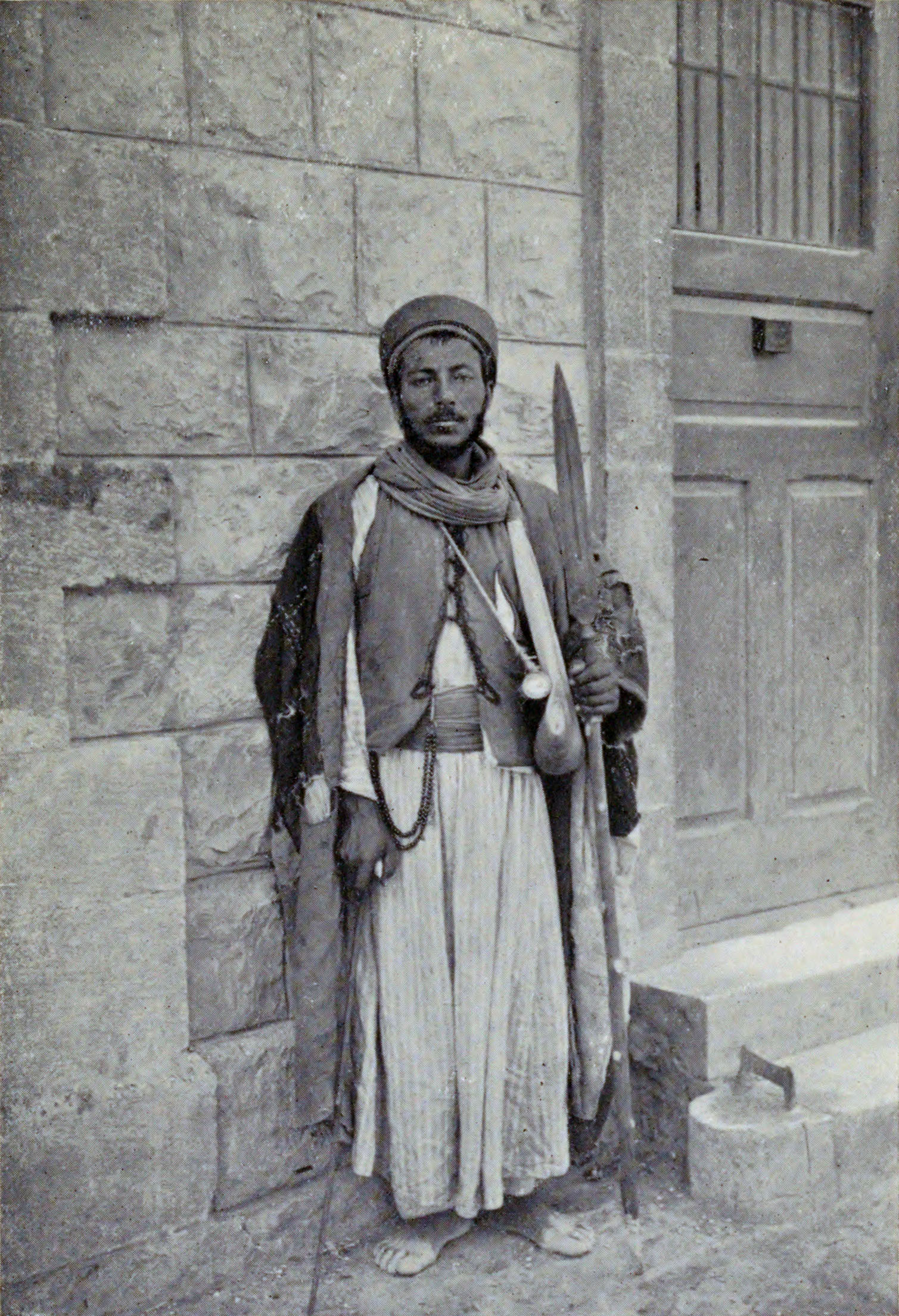
A Palestinian Dervish in 1913

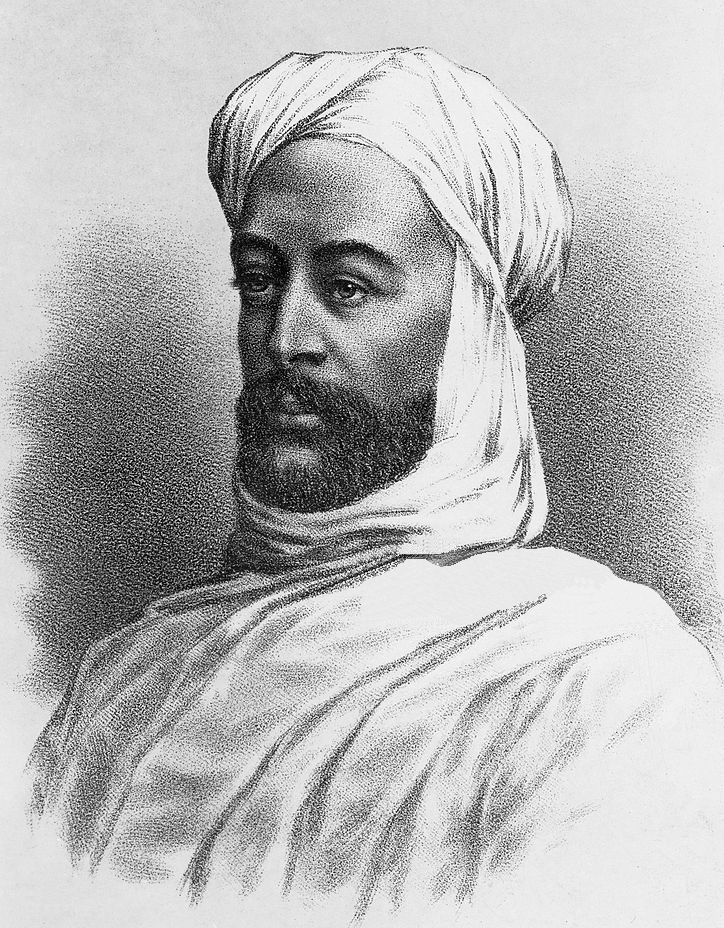
Muhammad Ahmad al-Mahdi, leader of the Sudanese Dervishes

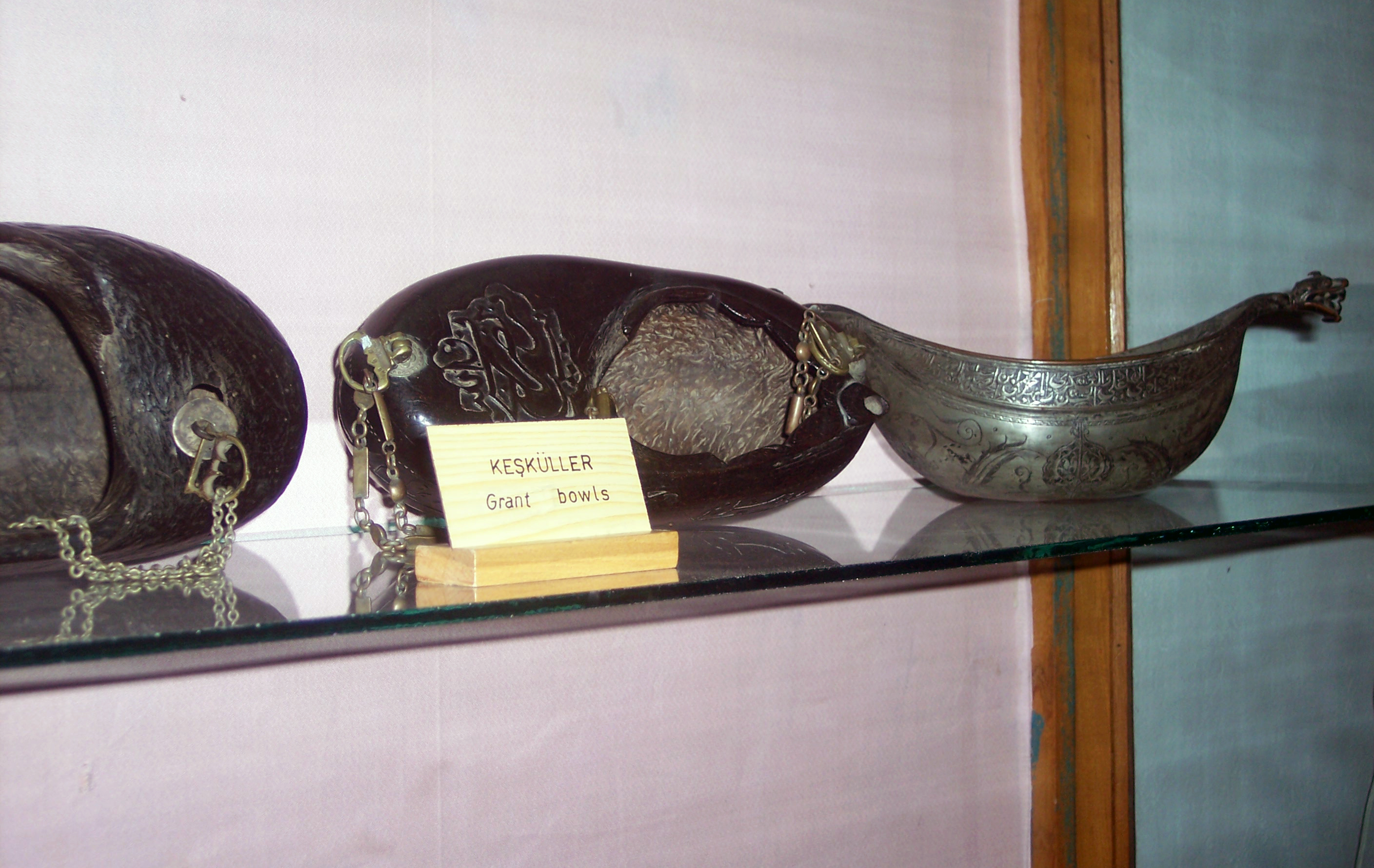
Sufi kashkuls were often made from a coco de mer which ordinary beggars would have difficulty to find

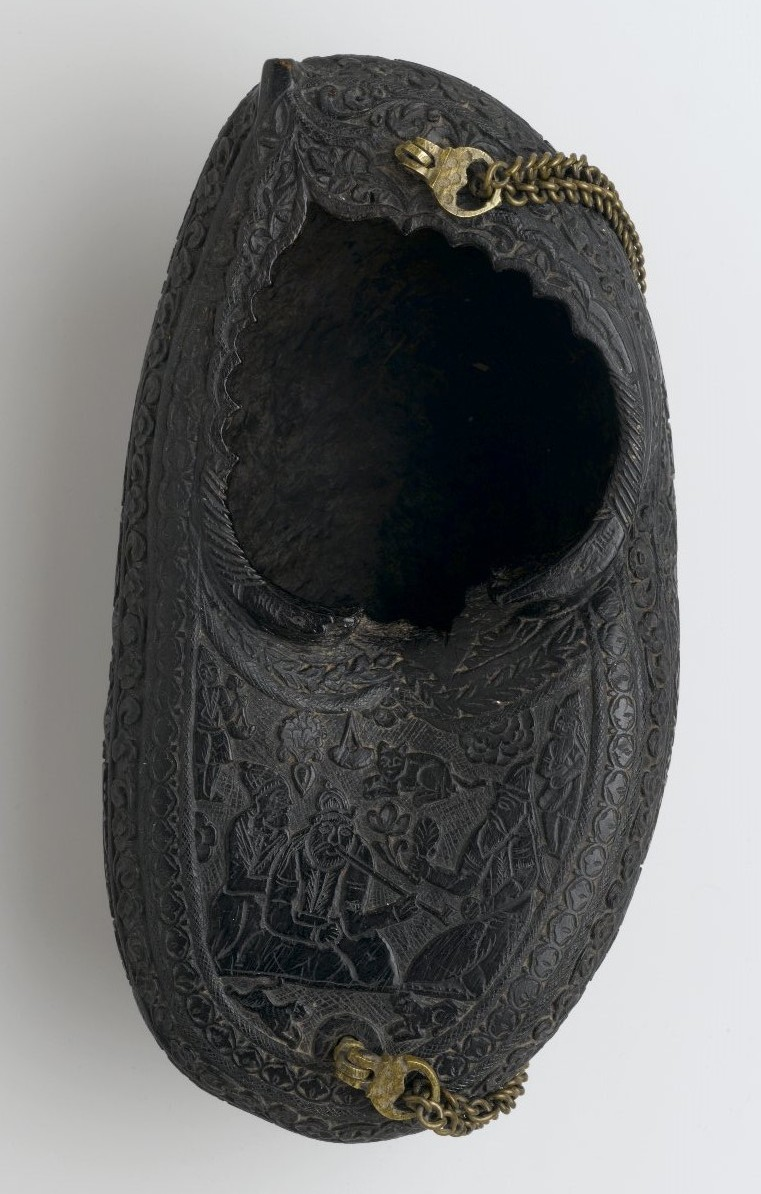
Kashkul, or Beggar's Bowl, with Portrait of Dervishes and a Mounted Falconer, A.H. 1280. Brooklyn Museum

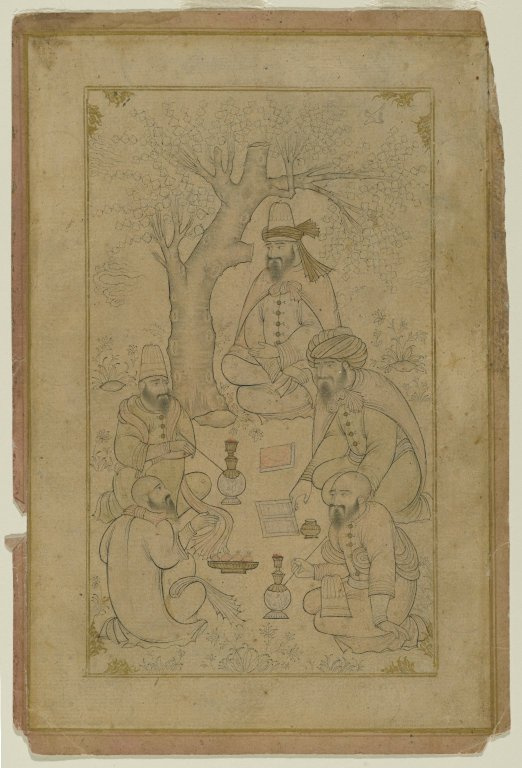
A Gathering of Dervishes in the Mughal Empire

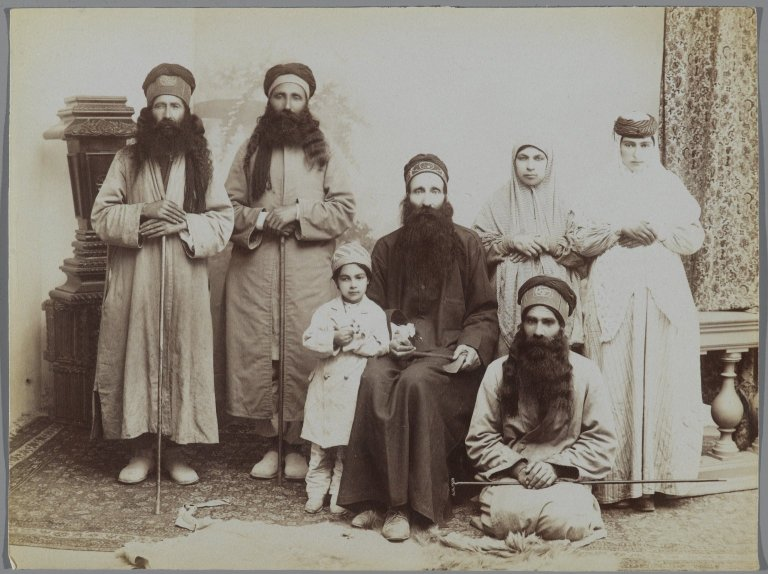
A family of Dervishes, possibly by Antoin Sevruguin (between 1876 and 1925)

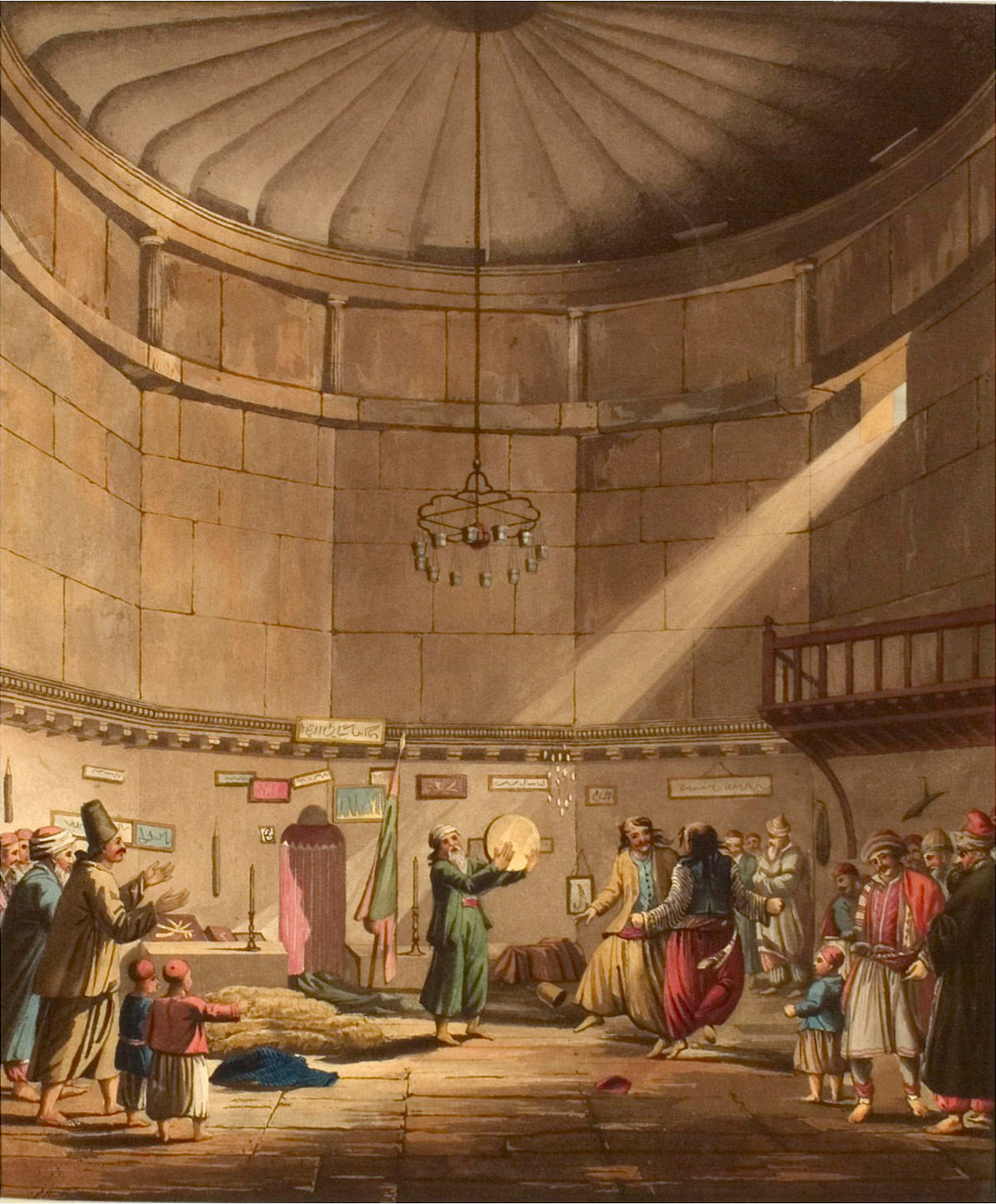
The dance of the dervishes, Athens

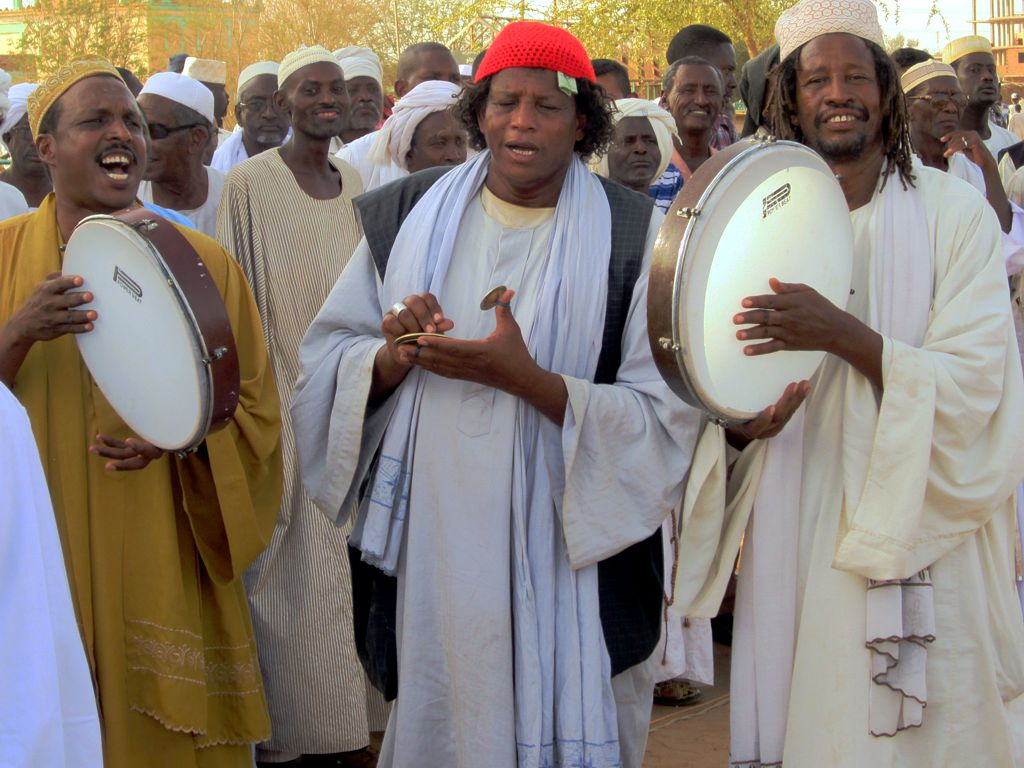
Sufi dervishes in Omdurman, Sudan

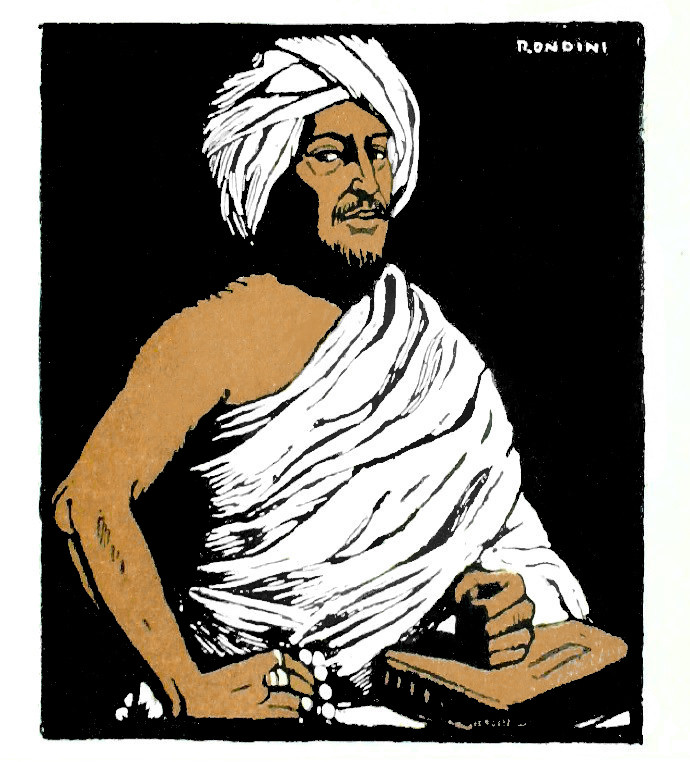
Sayyid Mohammed Abdullah Hassan, head of Darawiish

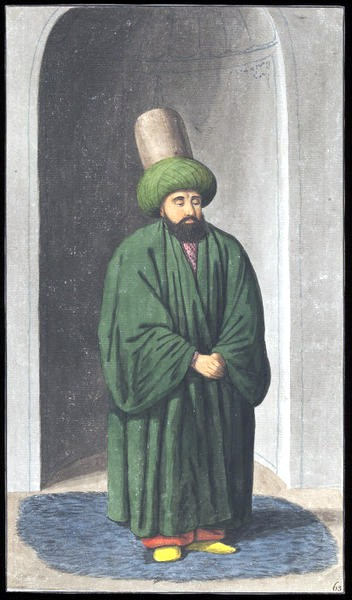
A Sheikh of the Rifa'i Sufi Order

== See also ==
- Derviş, a variant of the spelling
- Dervish movement (Somali) of 1889-1920
- Fakir, Sufi Muslim ascetic
- Qalandariyya Sufi order

=== Books ===
- The Tale of the Four Dervishes, 13th-century Persian story collection
- The Mongol Invasion, historical trilogy (1939-1955) by Soviet writer Vasily Yan; the connecting element is a dervish and chronicler
- Death and the Dervish, 1966 novel by Yugoslav writer Meša Selimović

== Relevant literature ==
- Xavier, Merin Shobhana. The Dervishes of the North: Rumi, Whirling, and the Making of Sufism in Canada. University of Toronto Press. 2023.
