= Voja Mirić =

Serbian television and film actor (1933–2019)

Vojislav "Voja" Mirić (Serbian Cyrillic: Воја Мирић; 7 April 1933 – 23 April 2019) was a Serbian television and film actor most noted for his role as Ahmed Nurudin in the 1974 Yugoslav movie Dervis i smrt (popularly known as Death and the Dervish).

== Life ==
Vojislav "Voja" Mirić was born on 7 April 1933 in Trstenik, central Serbia. His film career spanned over 30 years. His first appearance on television was in the series Veliki poduhvat in 1960. In 1964 he won the "Silver Arena" award as Best Actor in the Pula Film Festival of Yugoslavian Films for the Fadil Hadžić movie Službeni položaj. His most notable performance came as the medieval Bosnian Dervish in the 1974 movie Derviš i smrt (The Dervish and Death). His last appearance was in Amnezija in 1994.
