= Šukrija Pandžo =

Bosnian writer (1910-1984)

- Born: 27 April 1910; Kalinovik, Kingdom of Hungary, Austria-Hungary
- Died: 30 May 1984 (aged 74); Sarajevo, SR Bosnia and Herzegovina, SFR Yugoslavia
- Education: University of Belgrade
- Occupation: Writer
- Writing career
- Language: Serbo-Croatian
- Period: Postmodern
- Genres: Poetry, short stories
- Notable work: Samo još kosovi zvižduću

Šukrija Pandžo (27 April 1910 – 30 May 1984) was a Bosnian writer of children's books.

== Biography ==
He was born 1910 in Ulog near Kalinovik. Primary school he completed in hometown, a teacher's school in Mostar. He studied literature and French at the Higher Pedagogical School in Belgrade, graduating in 1940. As a teacher, he worked in various rural schools. After arriving in Sarajevo, Pandžo became in 1948 an editor in the cultural editorial office of Radio Sarajevo. He is one of the founders of the popular comedy show "Veselo veče" and the Association of Writers of Bosnia and Herzegovina.

He wrote poetry, prose and dramatic pices. He was a two-time winner of the Bosnia and Herzegovina Writers' Association award; for the collection of poems Razgovori in 1954 and for the collection of shorts stories Samo još kosovi zvižduću in 1961. By decision of the RTV Sarajevo Council, on April 10, 1970, he received a commemorative plaque in recognition of his many years of successful work, and on June 1, Josip Broz Tito awarded him the Order of Merit for the People with Silver Rays.

He died in 1984 in Sarajevo. A literary award in Bosnia and Herzegovina is named after him.

== Bibliography ==
- Pjesme (Sarajevo, 1952)
- Razgovori (Sarajevo, 1954)
- Ljudi smo (Sarajevo, 1958)
- Samo još kosovi zvižduću (Sarajevo, 1961)
- Bliže su postale zvijezde (Sarajevo, 1965)
- Iznad gore vjetri zbore (Sarajevo, 1968)
- Poezija (Sarajevo, 1973)
- Zeleni strah (Sarajevo, 1975)
- Na kraju puta (Sarajevo, 1979)
- Dobro mi došli (Sarajevo, 1980)
- List na putu (Sarajevo, 2000)
