= Meša Selimović =

Yugoslav writer (1910–1982)

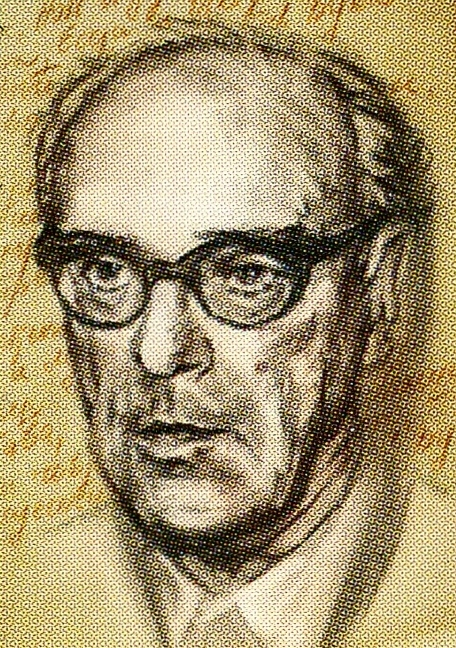
- Meša Selimović
- Born: Mehmed Selimović; 26 April 1910; Tuzla, Bosnia and Herzegovina, Austria-Hungary
- Died: 11 July 1982 (aged 72); Belgrade, SR Serbia, Yugoslavia
- Resting place: Belgrade New Cemetery
- Education: University of Belgrade
- Occupations: Writer, professor, art director
- Spouse(s): Desa Đorđić; Darka Božić (d. 1999)
- Children: Slobodanka; Maša; Jesenka
- Writing career
- Language: Serbo-Croatian
- Genre: novel
- Notable work: Death and the Dervish (1966)

Meša Selimović (Serbian Cyrillic: Меша Селимовић; pronounced [měːʃa selǐːmoʋitɕ]; born Mehmed Selimović; 26 April 1910 – 11 July 1982) was a Yugoslav writer, whose works are widely considered some of the most important in Bosnian and Serbian literature. Some of the main themes in his works are the relations between individuality and authority, life and death, and other existential problems.

== Biography ==
Selimović was born to a prominent Bosnian Muslim family on 26 April 1910 in Tuzla, Bosnia and Herzegovina, where he graduated from elementary school and high school.

In 1930, he enrolled to study the Serbo-Croatian language and literature at the University of Belgrade Faculty of Philology and graduated in 1934. His lecturers included Bogdan Popović, Pavle Popović, Vladimir Ćorović, Veselin Čajkanović, Aleksandar Belić and Stjepan Kuljbakin. In 1936, he returned to Tuzla to teach at the Tuzla Gymnasium, that today bears his name. At that time he participated in the Soko athletic organisation. He spent the first two years of the Second World War in Tuzla, until he was arrested for participation in the Partisan anti-fascist resistance movement in 1943. After his release, he moved to liberated territory, became a member of Communist Party of Yugoslavia and the political commissar of the Tuzla Detachment of the Partisans. During the war, Selimović's brother, also a communist, was executed by partisans' firing squad for alleged theft, without trial; Selimović's letter in defense of the brother was to no avail. That episode apparently affected Meša's later contemplative introduction to Death and the Dervish, where the main protagonist Ahmed Nurudin fails to rescue his imprisoned brother.

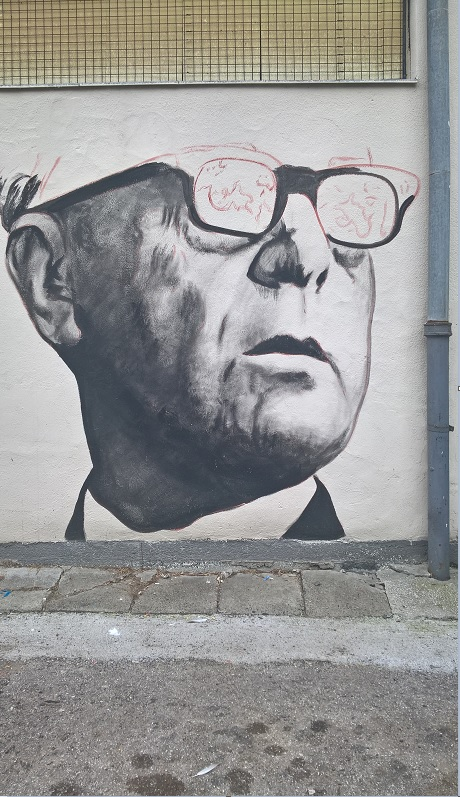
Selimović mural in Doboj

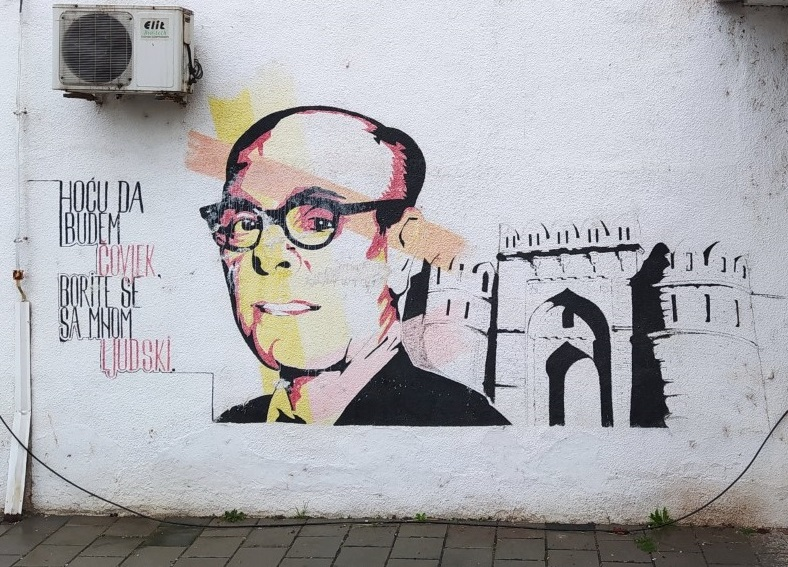
Selimović mural in Bijeljina

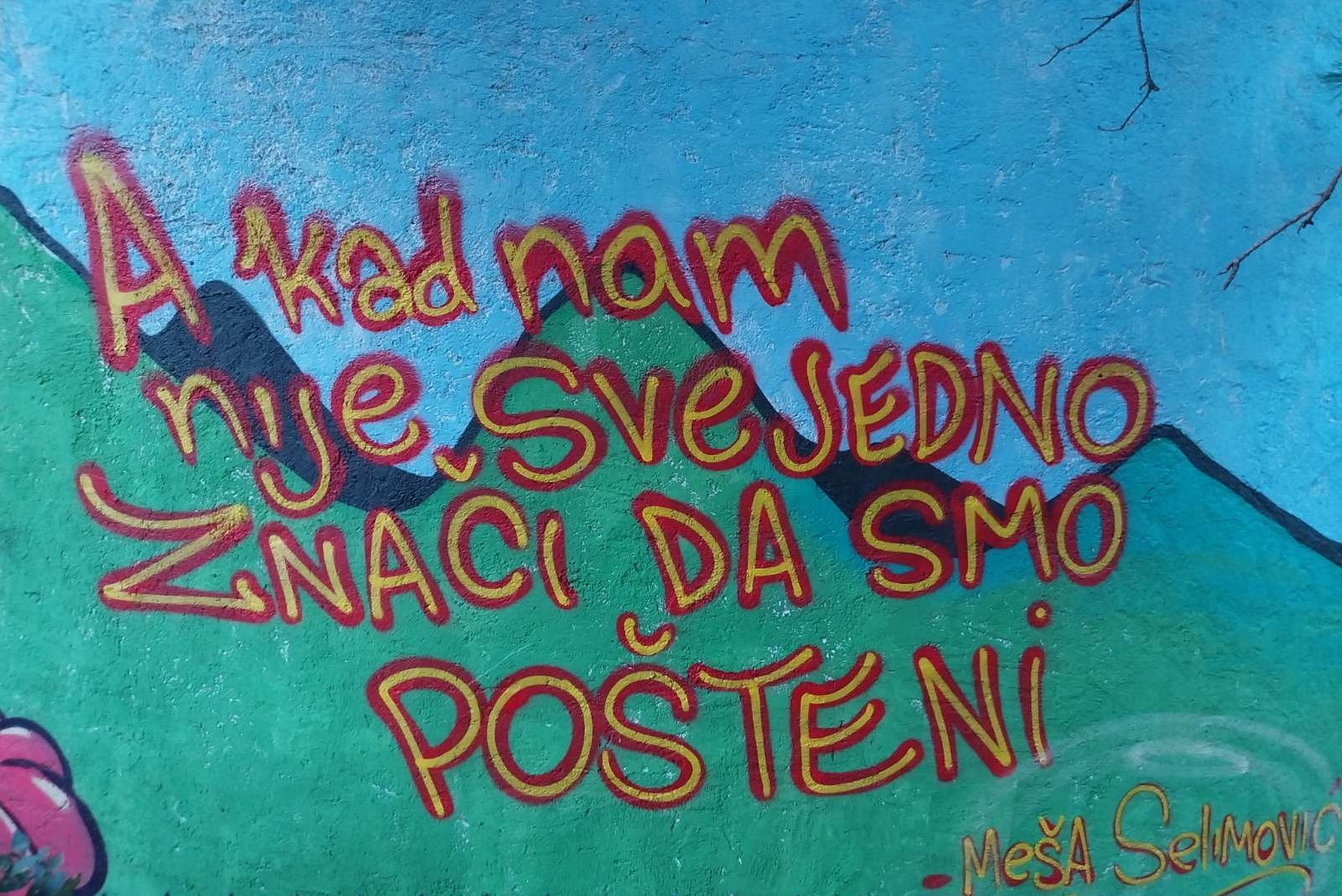
Selimović mural in Sarajevo

After the war, he briefly resided in Belgrade, and in 1947 he moved to Sarajevo, where he was the professor of High School of Pedagogy and Faculty of Philology, art director of Bosna Film, chief of the drama section of the National Theater, and chief editor of the publishing house Svjetlost. Exasperated by a latent conflict with several local politicians and intellectuals, in 1971 he moved to Belgrade, where he lived until his death in 1982.

=== Identity ===
Selimović researched the roots of his family and found out that he originated from the Drobnjaci tribe. Most members of the tribe consider themselves to be Serbs, while some are Montenegrins. Bosnian biographer Aida Bajraktarević has stated that a part of the Selimović family converted to Islam in order to "protect their Christian brethren".

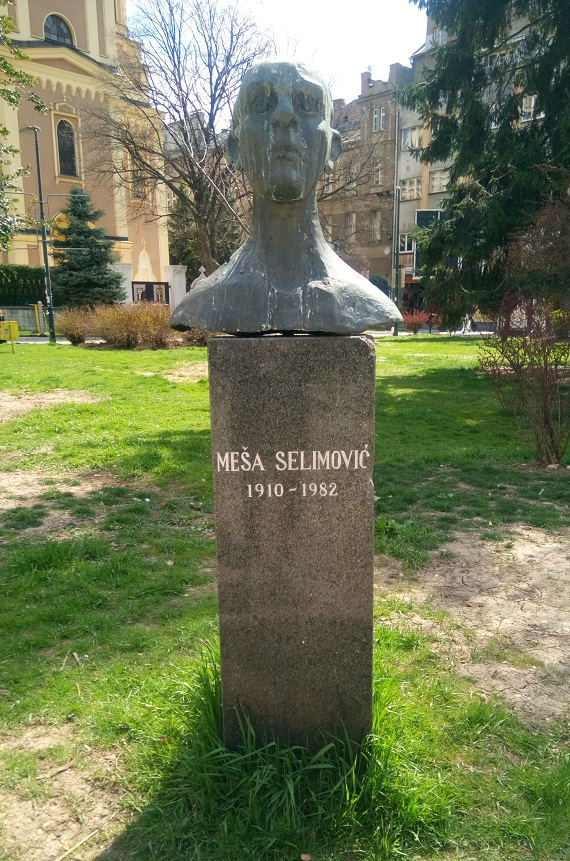
Monument to Meša Selimović in Sarajevo

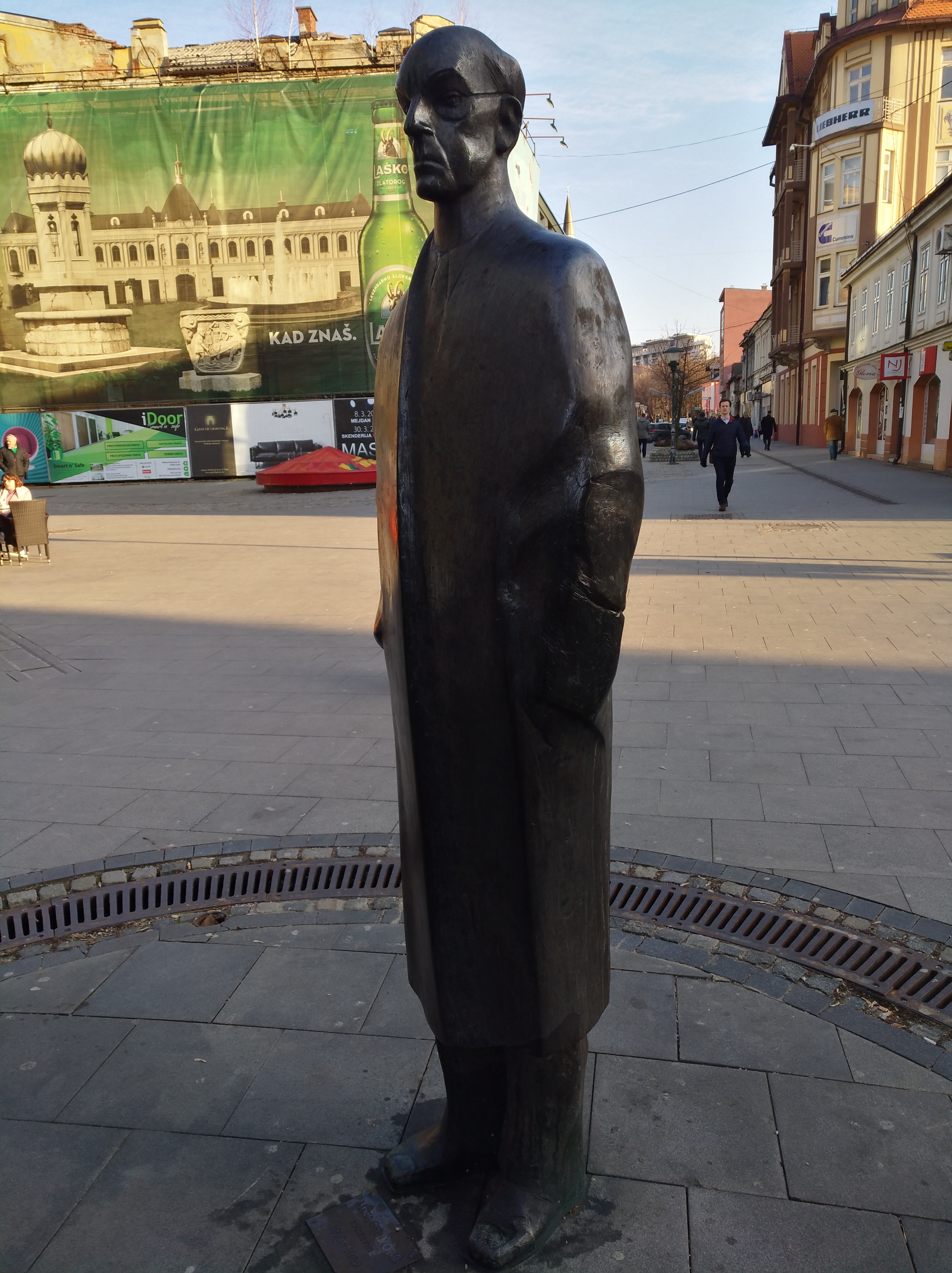
Monument to Meša Selimović in Tuzla

Selimović was a full member of the Academy of Sciences and Arts of Bosnia and Herzegovina, and a member of Serbian Academy of Sciences and Arts.

In his autobiographical narration, Sjećanja (transl. Memoirs), which Selimović complements with a memoir features thus transforming them into memoir prose, Selimović describes the environment and milieu of his Bosnian Muslim origin. He uses discursive self-perception, and confronts and reflects on his identity as a complex and a composite. Since perception of national belonging is distinctly subjective and simplistic, auto-perceptions are considered discursive creations, representamen, where memoirs overlap with socio-historical context. In doing so, and through lens of imagology, his autobiographical discourse becomes textual construct, or an imaginary discourse. Selimović's imaginarium turns his cultural self-reflection of his Bosnian Muslim identity into oddity, but he also describes it as a complex. His memories author then transpose on entire group, with a series of images.

Through the rhetoric of the image, Selimović confirms the cultural differences of Bosnian Muslims, and in that sense, his autobiographical narrative representamen confirms and strengthens the cultural and collective ethnic identity of Muslims. Selimović clearly define himself by stating, "I am a Muslim", and, "I am attached to my Bosnian and Muslim origins". On the other hand, when Selimović brought forward the information about his Christian origin, some Bosnian Muslim critics attacked him, claiming that "they also knew about their origin", and asking him what is to be achieved with publicly expressing such information.

Critics consider this to be a rationalization of his choice to seek recognition as writer belonging to Serbian literary circle, by claiming that his paternal heritage was that of Orthodox Christian identity, alleging a conversion to Islam back in the 17th century for pragmatic reasons. The chapter Parents in his Sjećanje provoked reaction and criticism in his native country, and will be deemed a "constructed phantasm", or imaginary discourse.

He was a communist and atheist.

== Works ==
Selimović began writing fairly late in his life. His first short story (Pjesma u oluji / A song in the storm) was published in 1948, when he was thirty-six. His first book, a collection of short stories Prva četa (The First Company) was published in 1950 when he was forty. His subsequent work, Tišine (Silences) was published eleven years later in 1961. The following books Tuđa zemlja (Foreign land, 1962) and Magla i mjesečina (Mist and Moonlight, 1965) did not receive widespread recognition either.

However, his novel Death and the Dervish (Derviš i smrt, 1966) was widely received as a masterpiece. The plot of the novel takes place in 18th-century Sarajevo under Ottoman rule, and reflects Selimović's own torment of the execution of his brother; the story speaks of the futility of one man's resistance against a repressive system, and the change that takes place within that man after he becomes a part of that very system. Some critics have likened this novel to Kafka's The Trial. It has been translated into a number of languages, including English, Russian, German, French, Italian, Turkish and Arabic. Each chapter of the novel opens with a Quran citation, the first being: "In the name of God, the most compassionate, the most merciful."

The next novel, Tvrđava (The Fortress, 1970), placed still further in the past, is slightly more optimistic, and fulfilled with faith in love, unlike the lonely contemplations and fear in Death and the Dervish. The Fortress and Death and the Dervish, as well as the subsequent Ostrvo (The Island, 1974), featuring an elderly couple facing aging and eventual death on a Dalmatian island, are the only novels of Selimović that have thus far been translated into English. The posthumously published Krug (The Circle, 1983) has not been translated into English.

He also wrote a book about Vuk Karadžić's orthographic reforms Za i protiv Vuka (For and Against Vuk), as well as his autobiography, Sjećanja.

Iranian writer and scholar Poopak Niktalab deemed Selimović one of the three pioneers of children's and youth literature in Muslim southeast Europe between 1950 and 1980 (along with Šukrija Pandžo and Skender Kulenović), who played an important role in the development of Bosnian children's and youth literature.

== Family ==
His brother's granddaughter is Serbian actress Hana Selimović. Also, his cousin Amar Selimović is a Bosnian actor. Meša Selimović is the uncle of Bosnian politician Mirsad Đonlagić.

== Bibliography ==
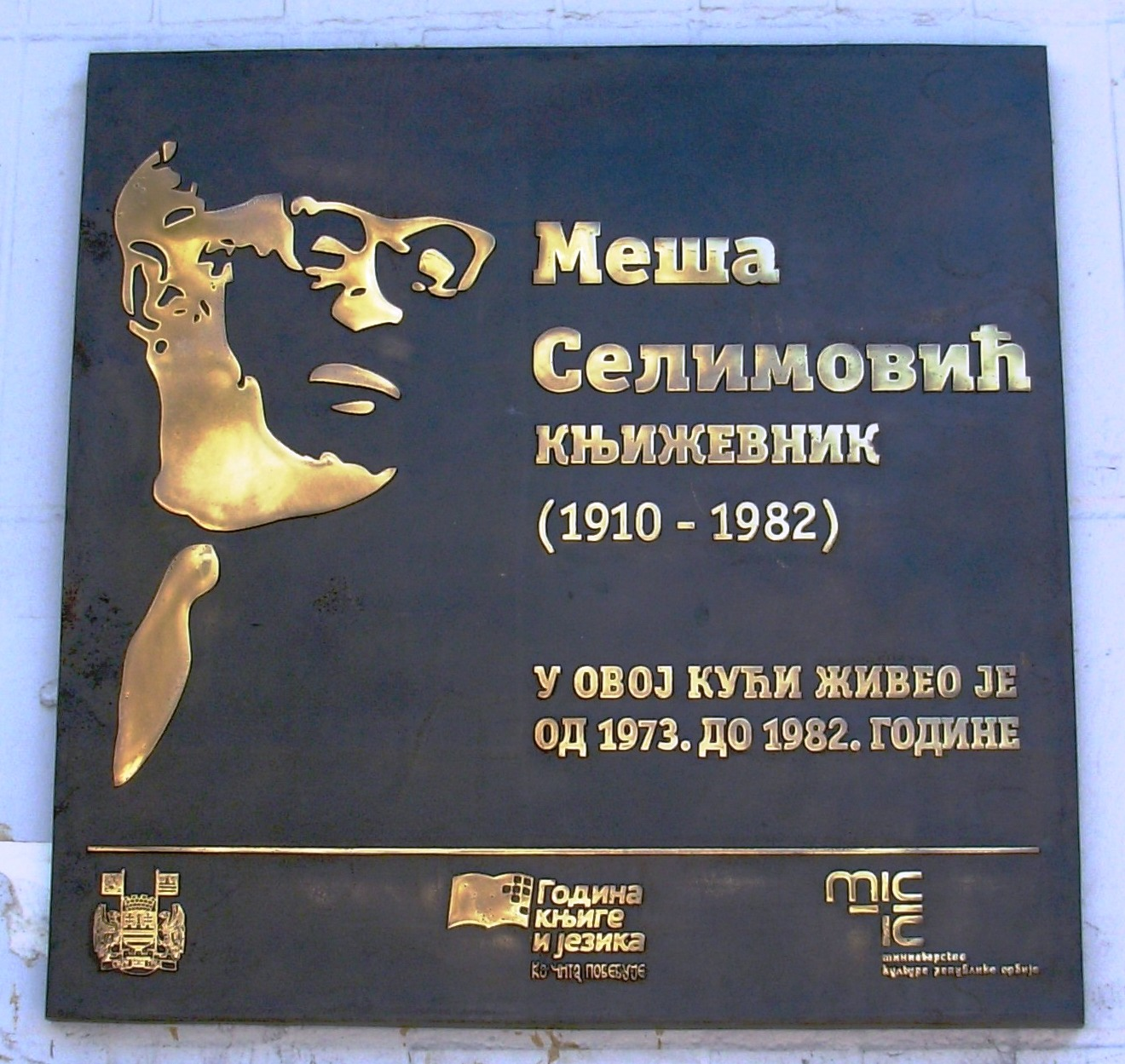
Plaque at his former home in Belgrade

- Uvrijeđeni čovjek (An Insulted Man) (1947)
- Prva četa (The First Company) (1950)
- Tuđa zemlja (Foreign Lands) (1957)
- Noći i jutra (Nights and Days) (film scenario) (1958)
- Tišine (Silence) (1961)
- Magla i mjesečina (Mist and Moonlight) (1965)
- Eseji i ogledi (Essays and Reflections) (1966)
- Derviš i smrt (Death and the Dervish) (1966)
- Za i protiv Vuka (Pro et Contra Vuk) (1967)
- Tvrđava (The Fortress) (1970)
- Ostrvo (The Island) (1974)
- Sjećanja (Memories) (1976)
- Krug (The Circle) (1983)

=== Translations into English ===
- The Island, 1974, The Serbian Heritage Academy of Canada, ISBN 0-920069-00-2
- Death and the Dervish, 1996, Northwestern University Press, ISBN 0-8101-1297-3
- The Fortress, 1999, Northwestern University Press, ISBN 0-8101-1713-4

Preceded by Blaže Koneski	President of the Association of Writers of Yugoslavia; 1964-1965	Succeeded by Matej Bor
